= Bicentenary Medal of the Linnean Society =

Scientific award given by the Linnean Society

The Bicentenary Medal is a scientific award given by the Linnean Society. It is awarded annually in recognition of work done by a biologist under the age of 40 years. The medal was first awarded in 1978 on the 200th anniversary of the death of Carl Linnaeus.

== Recipients ==
=== 1978–2018 ===
Recipients of the Bicentenary Medal have historically been listed on the Linnean Society website.

- 1978 - David Hawksworth
- 1979 - Roger Blackman
- 1980 - Christopher Humphries
- 1981 - Richard Barnes
- 1982 - John Birks
- 1983 - John Krebs
- 1984 - Peter Crane
- 1985 - Nicholas Barton
- 1986 - David Minter
- 1987 - Alec Jeffreys
- 1988 - Richard Gornall
- 1989 - Paul Brakefield
- 1990 - Charlie Jarvis
- 1991 - David Rollinson
- 1992 - Stephen Blackmore
- 1993 - Andrew B. Smith
- 1994 - Richard Bateman
- 1995 - Marie Kurmann
- 1996 - Paul Hugh Williams
- 1997 - David Gordon Reid
- 1998 - Roderic D. M. Page
- 1999 - Paul Kenrick
- 2000 - Michael Francis Fay
- 2001 - Mark Wilkinson
- 2002 - Per Ahlberg
- 2003 - Toby Pennington
- 2004 - John Russell Stothard
- 2005 - Pete Hollingsworth
- 2006 - Vincent Savolainen
- 2007 - Max Telford
- 2008 - William Baker
- 2009 - Michael S. Engel
- 2010 - Beverley Glover
- 2011 - Paul M. Barrett
- 2012 - Timothy Barraclough
- 2013 - No award
- 2014 - Bonnie Webster
- 2015 - Vince Smith
- 2016 - Anjali Goswami
- 2017 - Claire Spottiswoode
- 2018 - Edwige Moyroud

=== 2019–2025 ===
In 2020, the Society began incorporating biographical information on awardees.

- 2019 - Steve Portugal
- 2020 - Kayla King
- 2021 - Scott Taylor
- 2022 - James Rosindell
- 2023 - Tanisha M. Williams
- 2024 - Anne-Claire Fabre
- 2025 - Joanne E. Littlefair

== See also ==
- List of biology awards
