= Nomenclator Zoologicus =

Zoology book published from 1939 to 1994

- Title page to volume 1, 1939
- Author: Sheffield Airey Neave (and successors)
- Subject: Taxonomy
- Genre: Biological classification
- Publication date: 1939
- Publication place: United Kingdom

Nomenclator Zoologicus is one of the major compendia (in this case, of the names of genera and subgenera) in the field of zoological nomenclature, compiled by Sheffield Airey Neave and his successors and published in 9 volumes over the period 1939–1994, under the auspices of the Zoological Society of London; a tenth, electronic-only volume was also produced before the project ceased. It contains over 340,000 published name instances with their authorities and details of their original publication (as "microcitations", i.e. journal or book title, volume and page), certain nomenclatural notes and cross references, and an indication of the taxonomic group to which each is assigned. An electronic (digitised) version of volumes 1-10 was released online by the uBio project, based at the Marine Biological Laboratory, Woods Hole, in 2004–2005.

== Scope ==
The following statement regarding the scope of the enterprise is contained in Neave's Foreword to the initial volume, and is worth quoting in full:

This work constitutes an attempt to give as complete a record as possible of the bibliographical origins of the name of every genus or subgenus in zoology that has been published since 1758, the date of the 10th Edition of Linnaeus' Systema Naturae, up to the end of the year 1935. It does not contain the names to be found in works that have been excluded by the International Commission on Zoological Nomenclature (vide opinions 51, 72, 89, etc.), nor does it include clearly hypothetical ones. Owing, however, to the absence from the International Code of Zoological Nomenclature of any clear definition of what constitutes publication, I have been compelled, with some reluctance, to include names that appear in privately printed works. The work also contains a great number of variations of spelling, whether deliberate or accidental, that have occurred in all primary publications during the same period, though it does not profess to be by any means complete in this respect. It does not, however, include the many errors that are necessarily to be found in secondary publications, such as earlier Nomenclators, and works of reference, such as the Zoological Record. Exceptions to this are the cases in which deliberate emendations of a name were made by the author or editor of such works, e.g., the many examples in Agassiz' Index Universalis, and the cases in some of the earlier volumes of the Zoological Record in which certain Recorders deliberately altered names, possibly to accord with their own views of classical derivation. Certain other classes of alternative spellings are ignored, e.g., many of the names beginning with an initial diphthong and those names that have been variously written with an initial I or J. In these cases the name is indexed as it was originally spelt, and a general cross-reference will be found in its appropriate place.

— S.A. Neave, Foreword to volume 1 of Nomenclator Zoologicus (p. vii)

== Initial publication history ==
The concept for Neave's initial work was devised in 1934, with the actual work of compilation taking place over the period 1935–1939. The cost of compilation (as additional salaries, and excluding printing) was quoted as £1,800 in the funds of the day, which was provided by the Zoological Society of London, with printing costs covered by New York's Carnegie Corporation, the U.K. Royal Society and an anonymous donor. The initial compendium, entitled "Nomenclator Zoologicus; a list of the names of genera and subgenera in zoology from the Tenth Edition of Linnaeus, 1758, to the end of 1935", was issued in four volumes covering alphabetical portions A-C, D-L, M-P and Q-Z over the period 1939–1940, containing in excess of 225,000 published generic and subgeneric names. Volume 5, a supplement covering the period 1936–1945, was issued in 1950, followed by volume 6 (names 1946–1955, edited by M.A. Edwards and A.T. Hopwood) in 1966, volume 7 (names 1956–1965, edited by M.A. Edwards and H.G. Vevers) in 1975, volume 8 (names 1966–1977, edited by M.A. Edwards and M.A. Tobias) in 1993, and volume 9 (names 1978–1994, edited by M.A. Edwards, P. Manly and M.A. Tobias) in 1996. A tenth, electronic-only volume, covering names from 1995 to 2004, was also produced by Thomson Reuters, compilers of the Zoological Record, and made available to the compilers of the digital version at the Marine Biological Laboratory/Woods Hole Oceanographic Institution Library, Woods Hole (see below).

== Genera versus subgenera ==
In the initial 8 volumes of the published work, no distinction is made between genera and subgenera; this discrepancy was addressed in volumes 9 and 10, with names proposed as subgenera identified as such (with "as genusname (subgenusname)" at the end of the record). (Whether or not a name proposed as a subgenus becomes subsequently accepted as a generic name is the province of taxonomy, not nomenclature, and thus out of scope for a work such as Nomenclator Zoologicus.)

== Digitised version ==
With the approval of the original publishers and financial support from the Andrew W. Mellon Foundation and the Global Biodiversity Information Facility, the uBio project, based at the Marine Biological Laboratory/Woods Hole Oceanographic Institution Library in Woods Hole, U.S.A., undertook a project to digitise the printed volumes 1-9 of Nomenclator Zoologicus, to which was added content from the electronic volume 10, which made available on the internet in 2004–2005. Access to the digitised version is available via http://ubio.org/NomenclatorZoologicus/. It is stated as containing 340,000 genera as represented in the text as well as approximately 3000 supplemental corrections. The content has been converted (via optical character recognition and manual editing) into a database structure and is sorted into structured fields (scientific name, authority, citation) which can be searched together or individually; any name that is retrieved as the result of a user search can be traced back to a scanned image of the page from which it derives. Key benefits arising from the conversion of the content into digital form include the ability for a user to search across all original volumes simultaneously, the provision of search via the internet from any desktop (bypassing of the previous requirement for a user to physically locate and access the printed works), and the potential mobilisation of the data into the broader arena of biodiversity informatics including its availability for re-use and enhancement by other projects (see below).

== Data ongoing use ==
As digital data (individual records, corresponding to distinct entries in the original Nomenclator), entries from Neave's work continue to be incorporated in modern digital compilations, augmented in some cases with additional information such as present family allocation, nomenclatural or taxonomic status, and more.

=== Simple cases (single cited original publication instance) ===
As an example of the simplest case, the first entry in volume 1 of the original work reads

Aaages Barovskiĭ 1926, Rev. russe Ent., 20, 69.—Col

In the uBio digitised version, this has become record #1 (http://www.ubio.org/NZ/detail.php?uid=1&d=1); it has also been ported into IRMNG, the Interim Register of Marine and Nonmarine Genera, where it is record #1157780 (http://www.irmng.org/aphia.php?p=taxdetails&id=1157780), and the Global Biodiversity Information Facility (GBIF) taxonomic backbone, where it is record #4741596 (https://www.gbif.org/species/4741596). In the IRMNG record (and the GBIF record which is derived from the latter), the name is noted (according to J. Hallan's "Biology Catalog") as a possible misspelling of Aages Barovskiĭ, 1926 (although other sources claim that Aaages is correct) and is assigned to the family Coccinellidae, which is an enhancement from the original Nomenclator allocation which is simply "Col"[eoptera].

=== Compound cases (multiple cited original publication instances) ===
According to the compilers, in some cases it was unclear in which publication the name was definitely established, so multiple instances can be listed, for example:

Aades Schoenherr 1823, Isis (Oken), 1138; 1826, Curc. disp. meth., 156.—Col (uBio NZ record #5)

In other cases, the earliest known publication was deemed by the compilers to be a nomen nudum, resulting in an entry such as the following:

Ablabera Dejean 1833, Isis (Oken), 1138; Catal. Coléopt., ed. 2 (2), 159 [n.n.]; Erichson (1847), Nat. Ins. Dtschl., Col., 3, 695.—Col (uBio NZ record #156)

In the first of these cases, in the absence of other information, data has been ported into subsequent systems (IRMNG, GBIF) presuming that the earliest cited published instance is valid, i.e. this name is then cited as Aades Schoenherr, 1823 (IRMNG: 1219290; GBIF: 1228684). In the second case, the distinction between the unavailable (nomen nudum) and validly published instance is important both nomenclaturally and taxonomically, and so two records have been created based on the single Nomenclator entry, namely one for Ablabera Dejean, 1833 (listed as a nomen nudum: IRMNG 1396991, GBIF 7538591) plus another for Ablabera Erichson, 1847 (IRMNG 1232986, GBIF 1050104).

From the above examples it is clear that, although lacking some desirable supplementary information, the set of over 340,000 original Nomenclator records provides a huge foundation upon which subsequent biodiversity informatics initiatives have built further. An additional usage of the Nomenclator Zoologicus dataset is in the form of a mapping performed by Rod Page between records in the Nomenclator and records in the Index to Organism Names (ION) operated by Clarivate Analytics (formerly by Thomson Reuters), to DOIs, and to bibliographic databases such as the Biodiversity Heritage Library (BHL) and BioStor.

== Data availability ==
The original uBio database file used as base data for the R. Page cross mapped version cited above is accessible via the URL https://github.com/rdmpage/nomenclator-zoologicus/tree/master/data . A "cleaned" and extended version of the data is incorporated (along with data from a range of other sources) in the IRMNG genera dataset (versions 2013 onwards) which is accessible via http://www.irmng.org/download.php .

== Namesakes ==
A previous Nomenclator Zoologicus was published by Louis Agassiz in 1842, and another work with the same title by Samuel Hubbard Scudder in 1882, however in the twentieth century and today the name "Nomenclator Zoologicus" is most commonly employed for Neave's compilation (e.g. see Evenhuis, 2016).
