= Roger Blackman =

Roger Blackman may refer to:

- Roger Blackman (cricketer), Barbadian cricketer
- Roger L. Blackman, British entomologist
