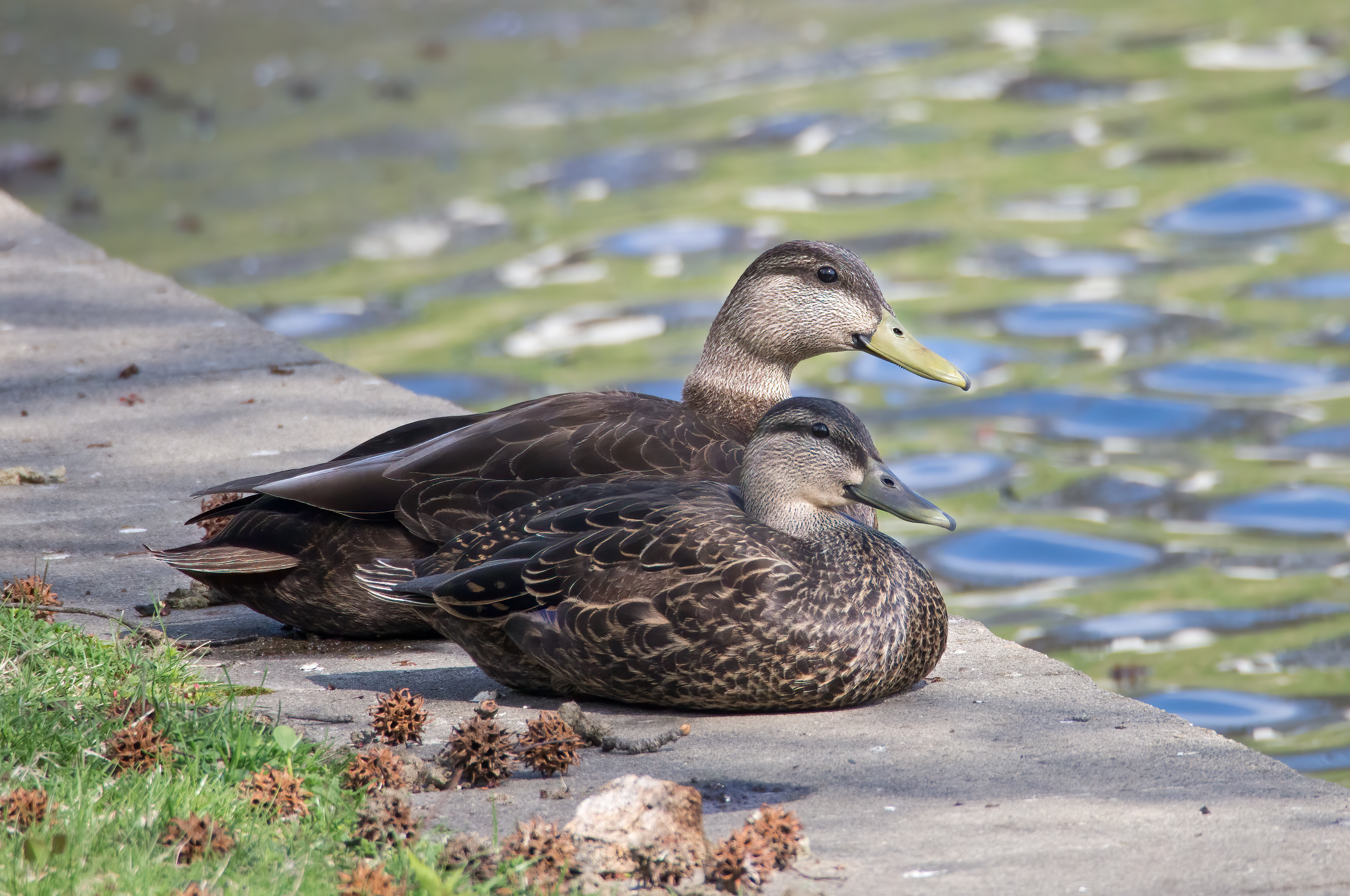
- Pair of black ducks

Conservation status
- Least Concern (IUCN 3.1)

Scientific classification
- Kingdom: Animalia
- Phylum: Chordata
- Class: Aves
- Order: Anseriformes
- Family: Anatidae
- Genus: Anas
- Species: A. rubripes

Binomial name
- Anas rubripes Brewster, 1902
- Breeding Migration Year-round Nonbreeding

Synonyms
- Anas obscura Gmelin, 1789

= American black duck =

American black duck Temporal range: Late Pleistocene–present

Species of bird

The American black duck (Anas rubripes) is a large dabbling duck in the family Anatidae. It was described by William Brewster in 1902. It is the heaviest species in the genus Anas, weighing 720–1,640 g (1.6–3.6 lb) on average and measuring 54–59 cm (21–23 in) in length with an 88–95 cm (35–37 in) wingspan. It somewhat resembles the female and eclipse male mallard in coloration, but has a darker plumage. The male and female are generally similar in appearance, but the male's bill is yellow, while the female's is dull green with dark marks on the upper mandible. It is native to eastern North America. During the breeding season, it is usually found in coastal and freshwater wetlands from Saskatchewan to the Atlantic in Canada and the Great Lakes and the Adirondacks in the United States. It is a partially migratory species, mostly wintering in the east-central United States, especially in coastal areas.

It interbreeds regularly and extensively with the mallard, to which it is closely related. The female lays six to 14 oval eggs, which have smooth shells in varied shades of white and buff green. Incubation usually takes 25 to 26 days, with both sexes sharing duties, although the male usually defends the territory until the female reaches the middle of her incubation period. Fledging occurs about 6 weeks after hatching. Once the eggs hatch, the hen leads the brood to rearing areas with abundant invertebrates and vegetation.

The American black duck is considered to be a species of least concern by the International Union for Conservation of Nature, although some populations of the species are in decline. It has long been valued as a game bird. Habitat loss due to drainage, global warming, filling of wetlands due to urbanization, and rising sea levels are major reasons for the declining population of the American black duck. The United States Fish and Wildlife Service has been purchasing and managing the habitat of this species in many areas to support the migratory stopover, wintering, and breeding populations. The Atlantic Coast Joint Venture also protects habitat through restoration and land-acquisition projects, mostly within their wintering and breeding areas.

== Taxonomy and etymology ==
American ornithologist William Brewster described the American black duck as Anas obscura rubripes, for "red-legged black duck", in his landmark article, "An undescribed form of the black duck (Anas obscura)", in The Auk in 1902, to distinguish between the two kinds of black ducks found in New England. One of them was described as being comparatively small, with brownish legs and an olivaceous or dusky bill, and the other as being comparatively larger, with a lighter skin tone, bright red legs, and a clear yellow bill. The larger of the two was described as Anas obscura by German naturalist Johann Friedrich Gmelin in 1789 in the 13th edition of the Systema Naturae, Part 2, and he based it on the "Dusky Duck" of Welsh naturalist Thomas Pennant. The current scientific name, Anas rubripes, is derived from Latin, with Anas meaning "duck" and rubripes coming from ruber, "red", and pes, "foot".

Pennant, in Arctic Zoology, Volume 2, described this duck as coming "from the province of New York" and having "a long and narrow dusky bill, tinged with blue: chin white: neck pale brown, streaked downwards with dusky lines." In a typical A. obscura, characteristics such as greenish black, olive green, or dusky olive bill; olivaceous brown legs with at most one reddish tinge; the nape and pileum nearly uniformly dark; spotless chin and throat; fine linear and dusky markings on the neck and sides of the head, rather than blackish, do not vary with age or season.

== Description ==
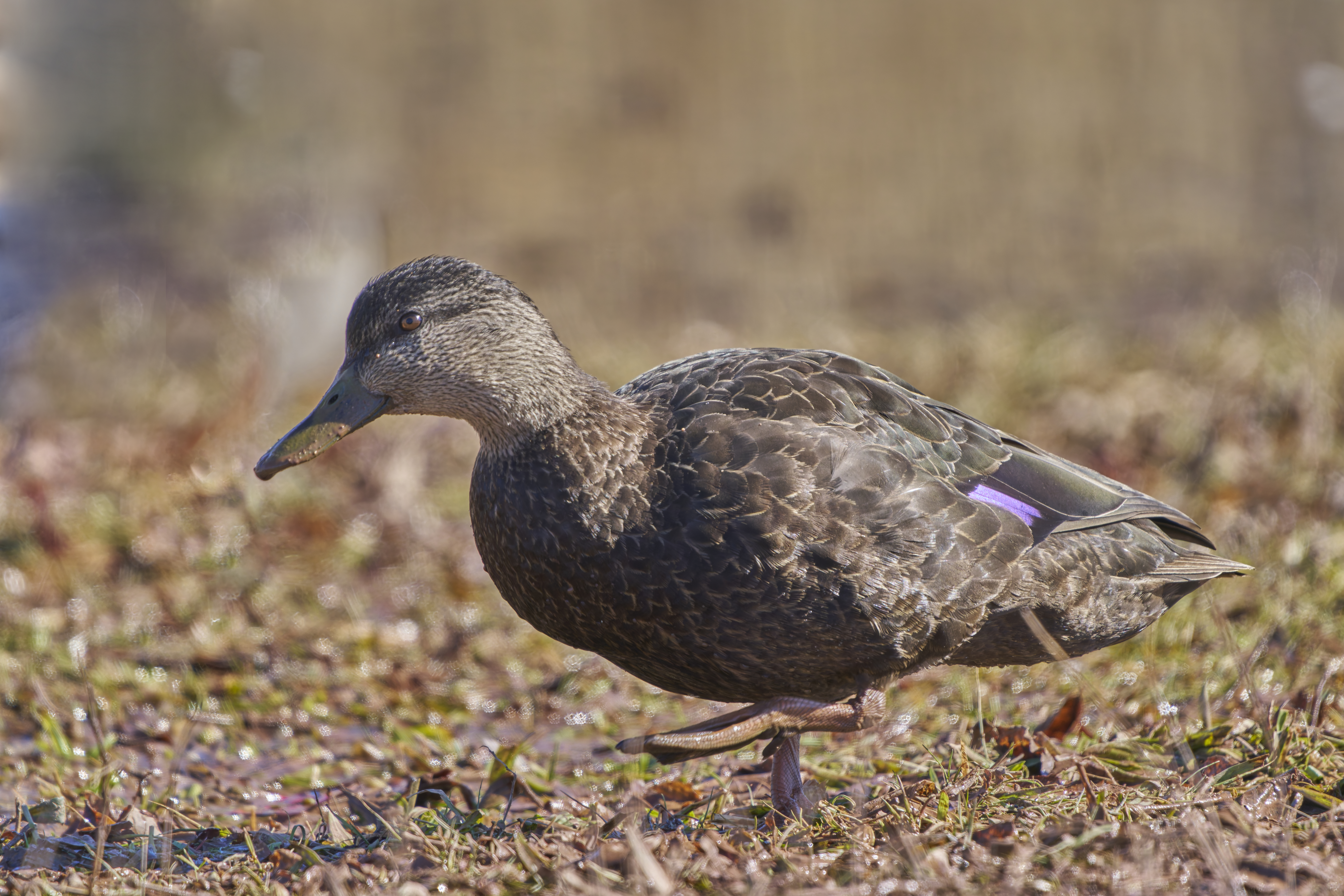
Individual with visible violet speculum flanked by dark stripes

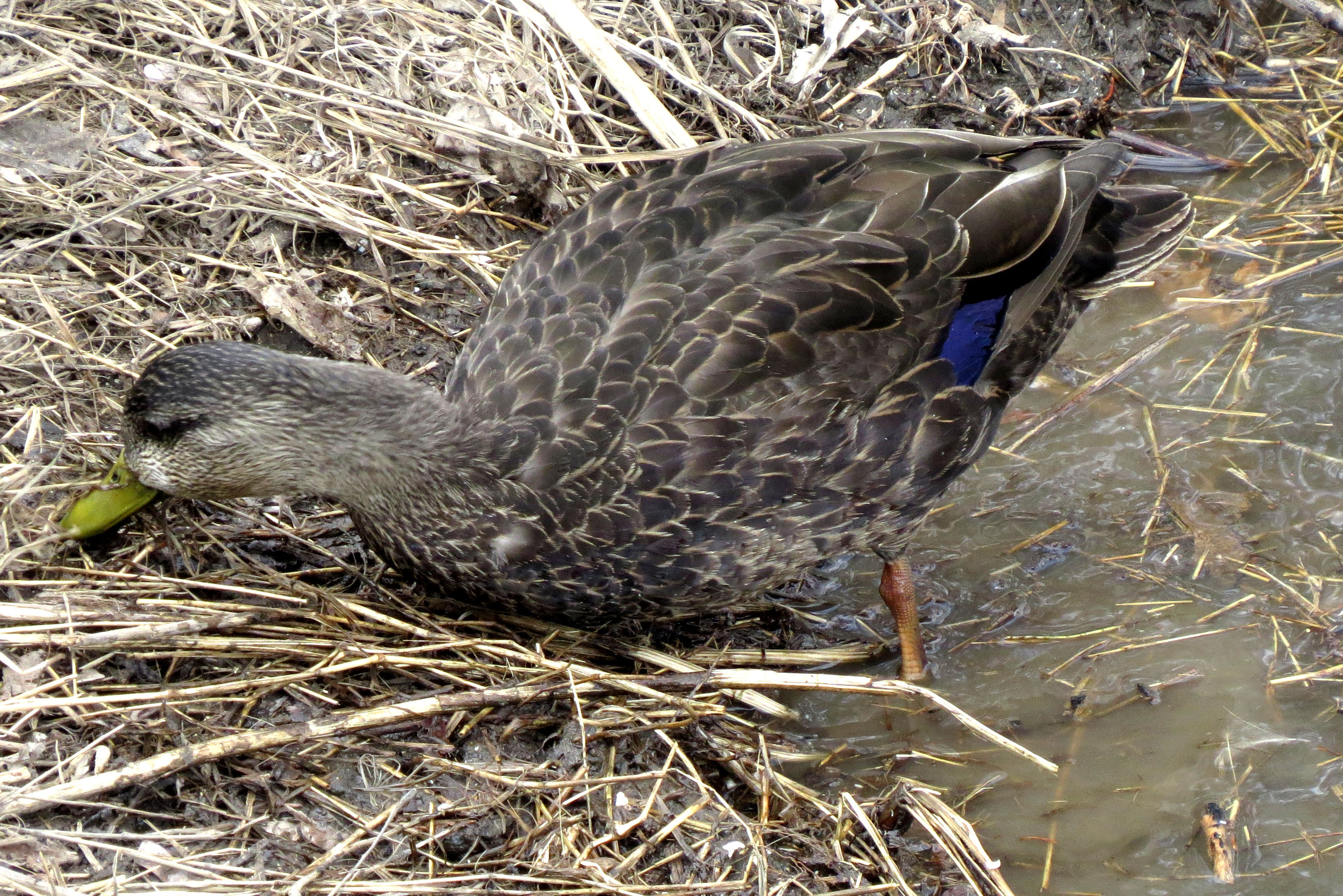
Male with a yellow beak and showing speculum

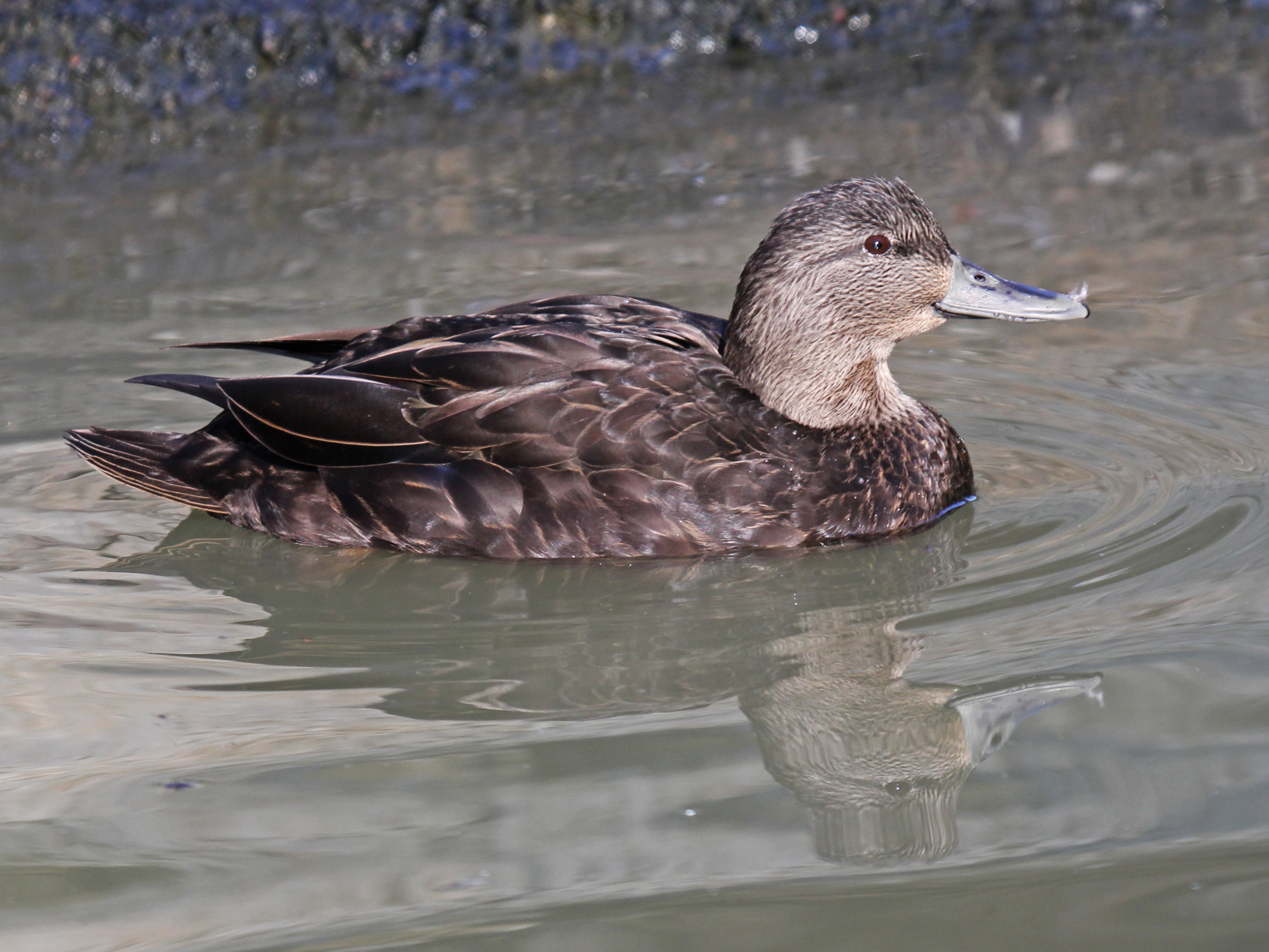
Female with a dull green beak

The American black duck weighs 720–1,640 g (1.59–3.62 lb) and measures 54–59 cm (21–23 in) in length with a 88–95 cm (35–37 in) wingspan. This species has the highest mean body mass in the genus Anas, with a sample of 376 males averaging 1.4 kg (3.1 lb) and 176 females averaging 1.1 kg (2.4 lb), although its size is typically quite similar to that of the familiar mallard. The American black duck somewhat resembles the female mallard in coloration, although the black duck's plumage is darker. Males and females are generally similar in appearance, but the male's bill is yellow while the female's is dull green with dark marks on the upper mandible, which is occasionally flecked with black. The head is brown, but is slightly lighter in tone than the darker brown body. The cheeks and throat are streaked brown, with a dark streak going through the crown and dark eye. The speculum feathers are iridescent violet-blue with predominantly black margins. The fleshy orange feet of the duck have dark webbing.

Both male and female American black ducks produce similar calls to their close relative, the mallard, with the female producing a loud sequence of quacks that fall in pitch.

In flight, the white lining of the underwings can be seen in contrast to the blackish underbody and upperside. The purple speculum lacks white bands at the front and rear, and rarely has a white trailing edge. A dark crescent is visible on the median underwing primary coverts.

Juveniles resemble adult females, but have broken, narrow, pale edges of underpart feathers, which give a slightly streaked rather than scalloped appearance, and the overall appearance is browner rather than uniformly blackish. Juvenile males have brownish-orange feet, while juvenile females have brownish feet and a dusky greyish-green bill.

== Distribution and habitat ==
The American black duck is endemic to eastern North America. In Canada, the range extends from northeastern Saskatchewan to Newfoundland and Labrador. In the United States, it is found in northern Illinois, Michigan, New Jersey, Ohio, Connecticut, Vermont, South Dakota, central West Virginia, Maine, and on the Atlantic coast south to North Carolina.

The American black duck is a habitat generalist, as it is associated with tidal marshes and present throughout the year in salt marshes from the Gulf of Maine to coastal Virginia. It usually prefers freshwater and coastal wetlands throughout northeastern America, including brackish marshes, estuaries, and edges of backwater ponds and rivers lined by speckled alder. It also inhabits beaver ponds, shallow lakes with sedges and reeds, bogs in open boreal, and mixed hardwood forests, as well as forested swamps. Populations in Vermont have also been found in glacial kettle ponds surrounded by bog mats. During winter, the American black duck mostly inhabits brackish marshes bordering bays, agricultural marshes, flooded timber, agricultural fields, estuaries, and riverine areas. Ducks usually take shelter from hunting and other disturbances by moving to brackish and fresh impoundments on conservation land.

== Behavior ==
=== Feeding ===
The American black duck is an omnivorous species with a diverse diet. It feeds by dabbling in shallow water and grazing on land. Its plant diet primarily includes a wide variety of wetland grasses and sedges, and the seeds, stems, leaves, and root stalks of aquatic plants, such as eelgrass, pondweed, and smartweed. Its animal diet includes mollusks, snails, amphipods, insects, mussels, and small fishes.

During the breeding season, the diet of the American black duck consists of roughly 80% plant food and 20% animal food. The animal food diet increases to 85% during winter. During nesting, the proportion of invertebrates increases. Ducklings mostly eat water invertebrates for the first 12 days after hatching, including aquatic snowbugs, snails, mayflies, dragonflies, beetles, flies, caddisflies, and larvae. After this, they shift to seeds and other plant food.

=== Breeding ===
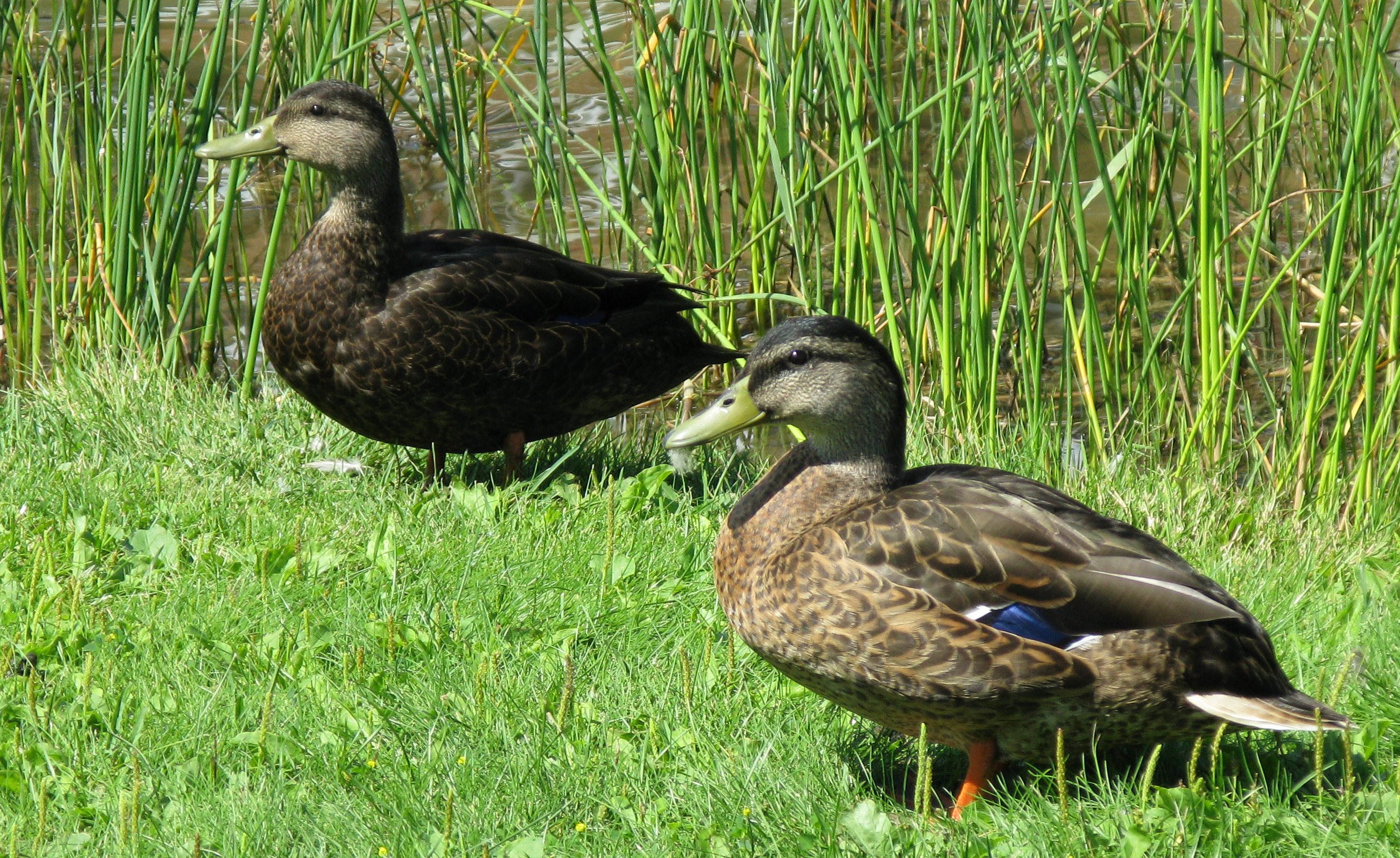
A female American black duck (top left) and a male mallard (bottom right) in eclipse plumage

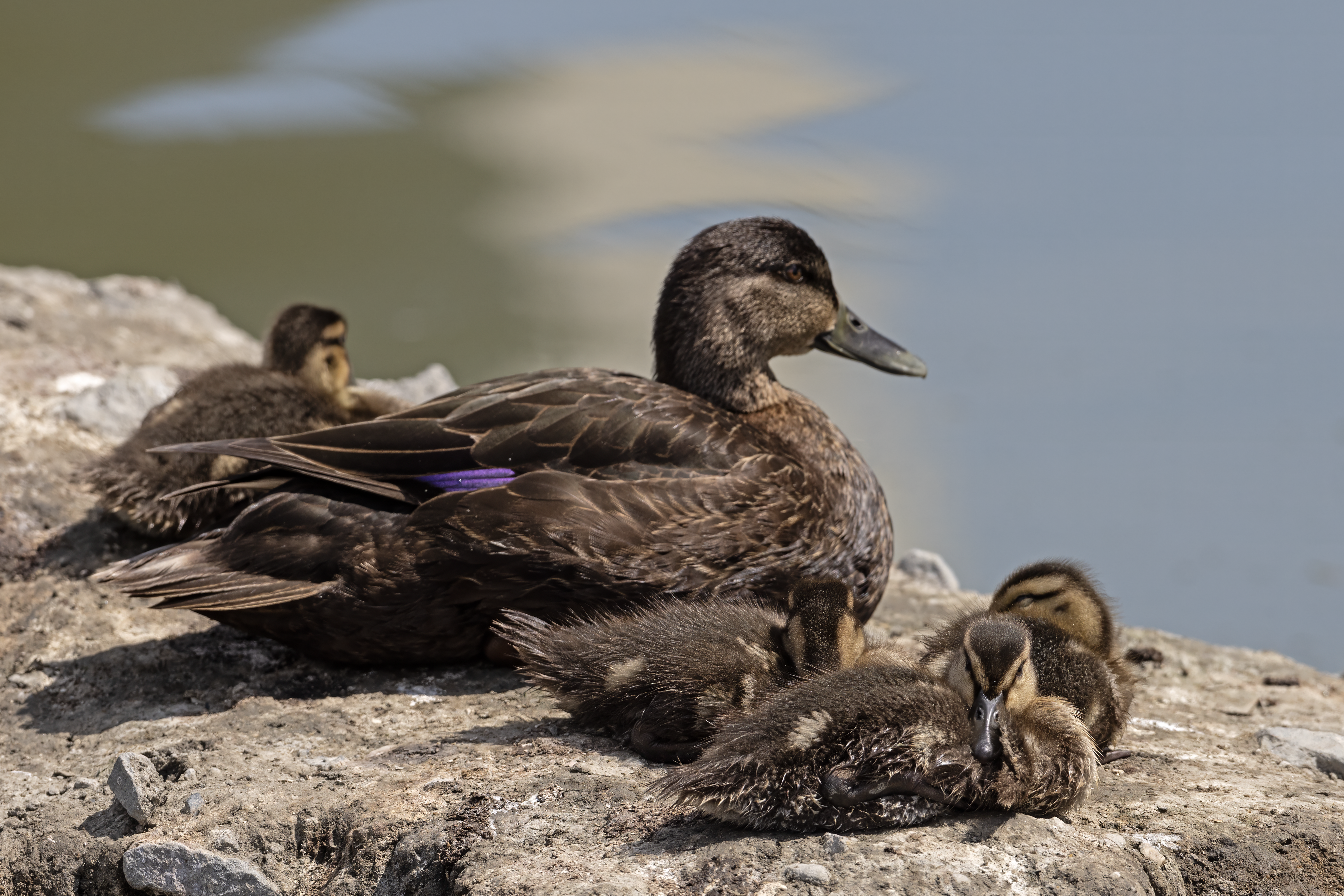
An adult American black duck with four ducklings

The breeding habitat includes alkaline marshes, acid bogs, lakes, ponds, rivers, marshes, brackish marshes, and the margins of estuaries and other aquatic environments in northern Saskatchewan, Manitoba, across Ontario, Quebec, and the Atlantic Canadian Provinces, plus the Great Lakes and the Adirondacks in the United States. It is partially migratory and many winter in the east-central United States, especially coastal areas; some remain year-round in the Great Lakes region. This duck is a rare vagrant to Great Britain and Ireland, where over the years, several birds have settled in and bred with the local mallard. The resulting hybrid can present considerable identification difficulties.

Nest sites are well-concealed on the ground, often in uplands. Egg clutches have six to 14 oval eggs, which have smooth shells in varied shades of white and buff green. On average, they measure 59.4 mm (2.34 in) long, 43.2 mm (1.70 in) wide and weigh 56.6 g (0.125 lb). Hatching takes 30 days on average. The incubation period varies, but usually takes 25 to 26 days. Both sexes share duties, although the male usually defends the territory until the female reaches the middle of her incubation period. It takes about six weeks to fledge. Once the eggs hatch, the hen leads the brood to rearing areas with abundant invertebrates and vegetation.

The American black duck interbreeds regularly and extensively with the mallard, to which it is closely related. Some authorities even consider the black duck to be a subspecies of the mallard instead of a separate species. Mank et al. argue that this is in error, as the extent of hybridization alone is not a valid means to delimit Anas species.

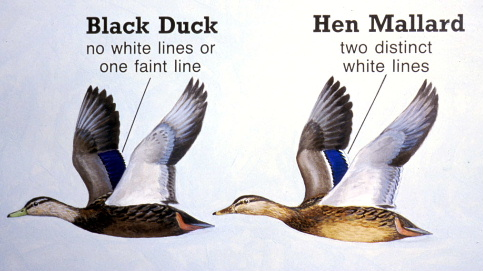
Chart showing differences between the American black duck and the female mallard

The American black duck and the mallard were formerly separated by habitat preference, with the American black duck's dark plumage giving it a selective advantage in shaded forest pools in eastern North America, and the mallard's lighter plumage giving it an advantage in the brighter, more open prairie and plains lakes. According to this view, recent deforestation in the east and tree planting on the plains has broken down this habitat separation, leading to the high levels of hybridization now observed. However, rates of past hybridization are unknown in this and most other avian hybrid zones, and in the case of the American black duck, past hybridization rates are merely presumed to be lower than those seen today. Also, many avian hybrid zones are known to be stable and longstanding despite the occurrence of extensive interbreeding. The American black duck and the local mallard are now very hard to distinguish by means of microsatellite comparisons, even if many specimens are sampled. Contrary to this study's claims, the question of whether the American haplotype is an original mallard lineage is far from resolved. Their statement, "Northern black ducks are now no more distinct from mallards than their southern conspecifics" only holds true in regard to the molecular markers tested. As birds indistinguishable according to the set of microsatellite markers still can look different, other genetic differences simply were not tested in the study.

In captivity studies, the hybrids were found to follow Haldane's rule, with hybrid females often dying before they reach sexual maturity, thereby supporting the case for the American black duck being a distinct species.

=== Nest predators and hazards ===
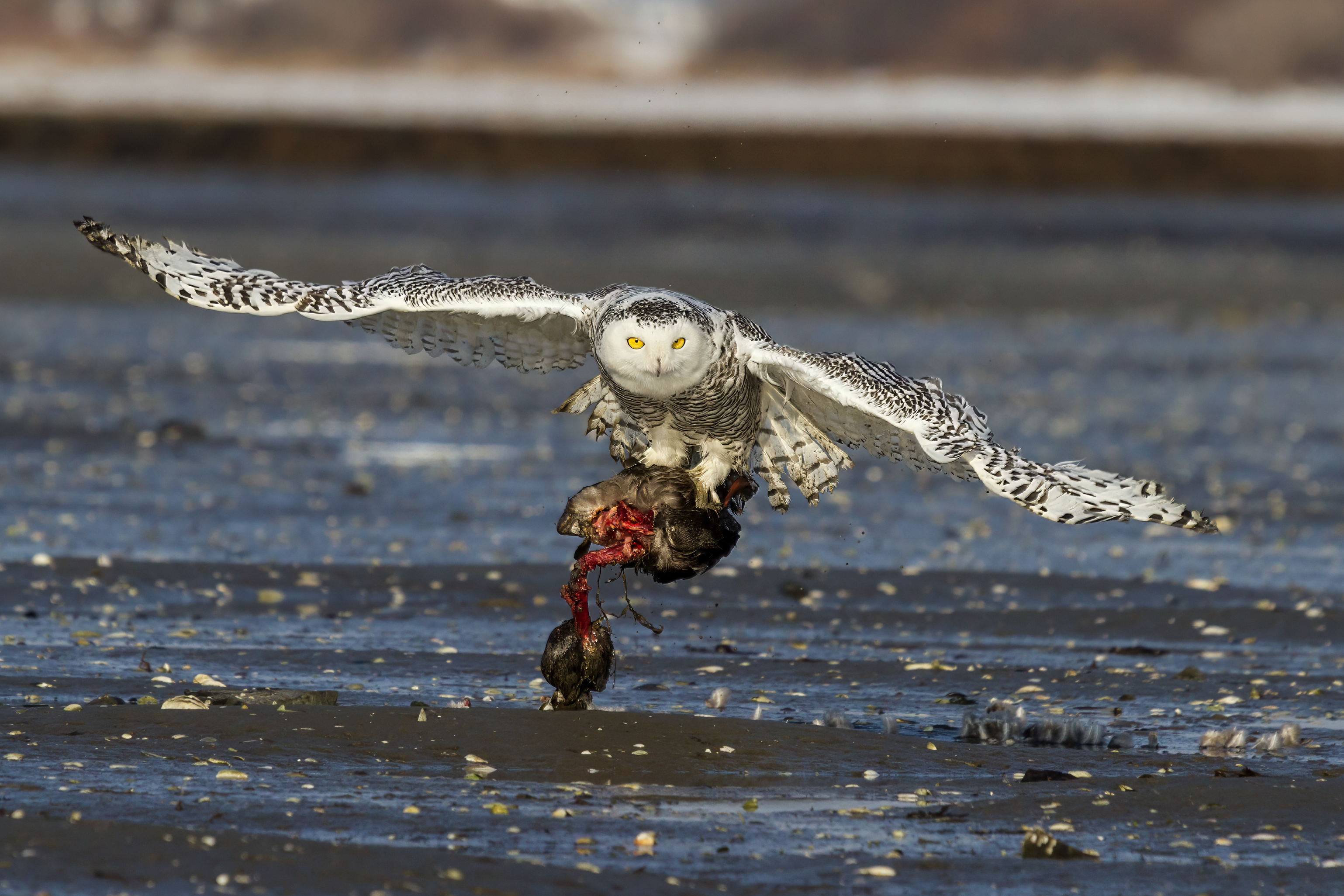
A snowy owl takes an adult American black duck, Maine, USA

The nest predators of the American black duck include American crows, gulls, and raccoons, especially in tree nests. Hawks and owls are also major predators of adults. Bullfrogs and snapping turtles eat many ducklings. Ducklings often catch diseases caused by protozoan blood parasites transmitted by bites of insects such as blackflies. They are also vulnerable to lead-shot poisoning, known as plumbism, due to their bottom-foraging food habits.

== Status and conservation ==
Since 1988, the American black duck has been rated as least concern on the IUCN Red List of Endangered Species, because the range of this species is extremely large, which is not near the threshold of vulnerable species. In addition, the total population is large, and although it is declining, it is not declining fast enough to make the species vulnerable. It has long been valued as a game bird, being extremely wary and fast flying. Habitat loss due to drainage, filling of wetlands due to urbanization, global warming and rising sea levels are major reasons for the declining population. Some conservationists consider hybridization and competition with the mallard as an additional source of concern should this decline continue. Hybridization itself is not a major problem; natural selection makes sure that the best-adapted individuals have the most offspring. However, the reduced viability of female hybrids causes some broods to fail in the long run due to the death of the offspring before reproducing themselves. While this is not a problem in the plentiful mallard, it might place an additional strain on the American black duck's population. Recent research conducted for the Delta Waterfowl Foundation suggests that hybrids are a result of forced copulations and not a normal pairing choice by black hens.

The United States Fish and Wildlife Service has continued to purchase and manage habitat in many areas to support the migratory stopover, wintering and breeding populations of the American black duck. In addition, the Montezuma National Wildlife Refuge has purchased and restored over 1,000 acres of wetlands to provide stopover habitat for over 10,000 American black ducks during fall migration. Also, the Atlantic Coast Joint Venture has been protecting the habitat of the American black duck through habitat restoration and land acquisition projects, mostly within their wintering and breeding areas. In 2003, a Boreal Forest Conservation Framework was adopted by conservation organizations, industries and First Nations to protect the Canadian boreal forests, including the American black duck's eastern Canadian breeding range.
