= Judith Diment =

British advocate for polio eradication

Judith Diment MBE

Member of Windsor and Maidenhead Borough Council for Riverside
- In office 2016–2019

Personal details
- Party: Conservative
- Spouse: Dr Tony Diment (died 2015)
- Children: 2, including Robert Diament
- Education: Aberystwyth University, Geology and Geography; University of London
- Occupation: Rotarian (polio eradication); Humanitarian; Volunteer; Councillor (2016–19); Campaign Aide to Theresa May (2010, 2015); PR & Marketing consultant; Botany Librarian, British Museum Natural History; Geologist

Judith Ann Diment MBE is a British PR & Marketing consultant and humanitarian known for her advocacy for polio eradication.

She is chair of the Polio Eradication Advocacy Task Force at Rotary International, having organised polio advocacy and media events at the Houses of Parliament and the European Parliament. She is also the Dean of the Rotary Representative Network, which represents the service organisation, at the UN, Commonwealth and other international organisations.

In February 2008, Diment orchestrated a large-scale public awareness campaign, projecting "END POLIO NOW" onto the Palace of Westminster. The phrase became the global slogan of Rotary International's initiative to eradicate polio from the then four remaining endemic countries. The campaign has been replicated on numerous landmarks worldwide.

Diment served as a councillor for the Royal Borough of Windsor and Maidenhead at the Windsor and Maidenhead Borough Council from 2016 to 2019 as a member of the Conservative Party.

== Career ==
Studied Geology and Geography at Aberystwyth University.

Worked at the British Museum, Natural History from the 70's, including as Botany Librarian, where she worked on the Banks' Florilegium project with Chris Humphries.

Diment joined Windsor St George Rotary Club in 1996. She became president in 2004, then district governor for Rotary across the Thames Valley.

Campaign Aide to Theresa May during the 2010 and 2015 United Kingdom general elections.

Minister of State for International Development Alistair Burt spoke of her work to the House of Commons in 2018.

In 2019, then Prime Minister of the United Kingdom, Theresa May, and Queen regnant, Elizabeth II, both publicly recognised Diment for her charitable work in polio eradication and other causes.

"Building on past progress and overcoming remaining hurdles requires continued support and (polio eradication) is a sound value-added investment. Today, we are proud to present the new 2019–2023 GPEI Investment Case…and thank all our partners for their input. This support and engagement are invaluable, given that this is a document that argues that polio can be eradicated but only with sufficient financial and political support. To ensure success, the Initiative needs US$ 3.27 billion through 2023… any investor is looking for measurable progress, tangible dividends, and return on investment— the GPEI has all of these. Rotary looks forward to joining all partners to make a funding pledge in Abu Dhabi, and to continued collaboration towards the fulfilment of a polio-free world from which we will all reap the dividends in perpetuity." — Judith Diment presenting the GPEI 2019–2023 Investment Case, published by the World Health Organization on behalf of the Global Polio Eradication Initiative in 2019.

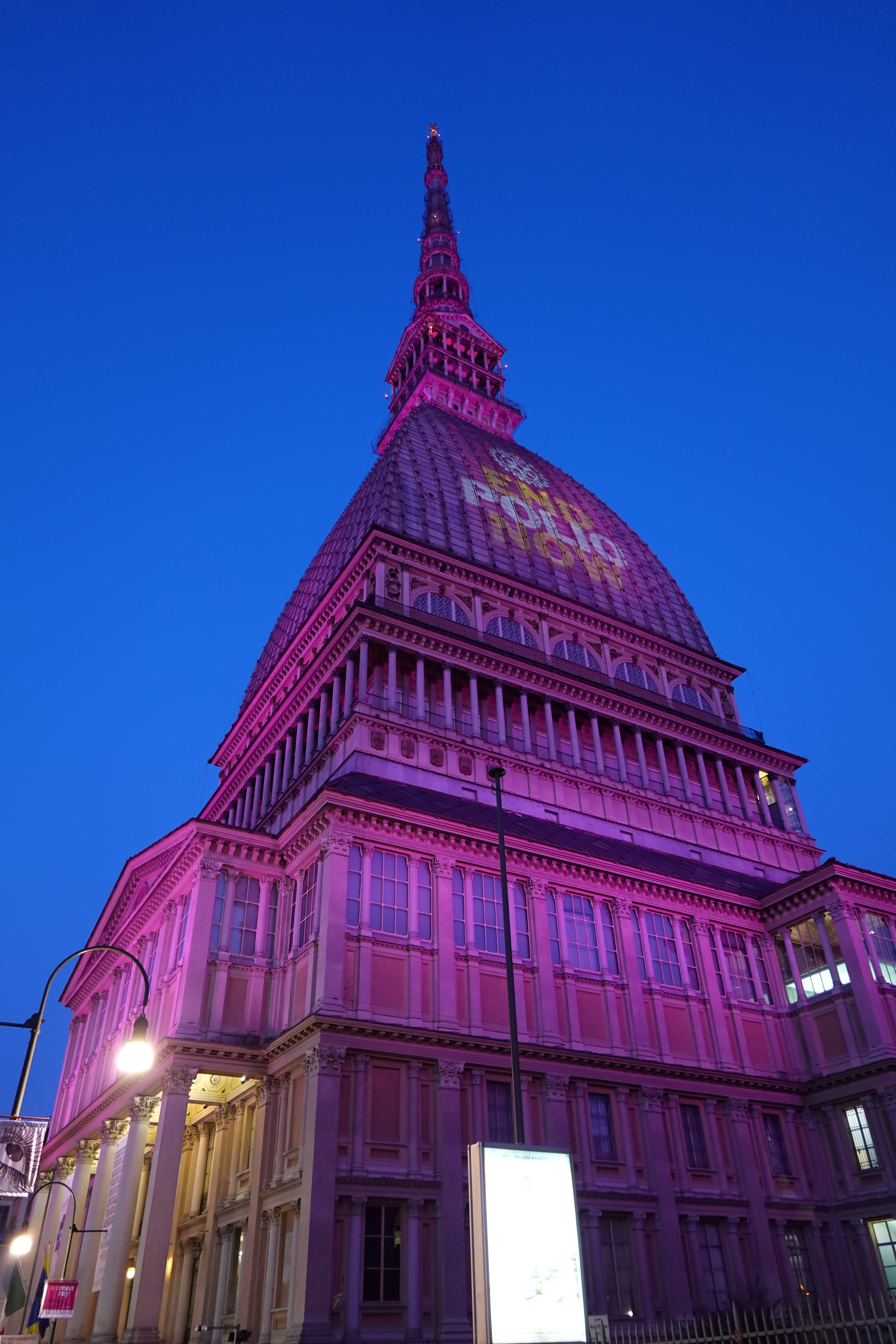
"END POLIO NOW" projected onto the Mole Antonelliana in Turin, Italy on World Polio Day 2019

== END POLIO NOW campaign ==
The "END POLIO NOW" campaign continued to landmarks including:

- Trevi Fountain, Rome
- New York Stock Exchange Building, Manhattan
- Charminar, India
- Byblos Castle, Lebanon
- Taipei 101, Taiwan
- Castillo San Cristóbal in San Juan, Puerto Rico
- Binnenhof (The Dutch Parliament Buildings) in The Hague, Netherlands
- Karachi Port Trust Building, Pakistan
- Kanazawa Castle, Japan
- Sydney Opera House, Australia
- Tower Bridge, London
- Tower of London
- Quezon Memorial Shrine, Philippines
- Moai, Easter Island
- Coliseum, Rome
- Pyramid of Khafre, Egypt
- Wrigley Building, Chicago
- Obelisco de Buenos Aires, Argentina
- San Francisco Ferry Building

The campaign regularly features as part of World Polio Day.

== Bibliography ==
Polio eradication

- Batson, Amie; Glassman, Amanda; Federgruen, Awi; Diment, Judith; Ganguly, Nirmal Kumar; Makoni, Simba; Plotkin, Stanley (December 2022). "The world needs to prepare now to prevent polio resurgence post eradication". BMJ Global Health. 7 (12) e011485. doi:10.1136/bmjgh-2022-011485. eISSN 2059-7908. PMC 9806073. PMID 36581335.

Natural history

- Diment, Judith A.; Humphries, Christopher J.; Newington, Linda; Shaughnessy, Elaine (1984). "Catalogue of the Natural History drawings commissioned by Joseph Banks on the Endeavour Voyage 1768–1771 held in the British Museum (Natural History): Part 1: Botany: Australia". Bulletin of the British Museum (Natural History). Historical Series. 11 (Complete). London: British Museum (Natural History): 1–183. doi:10.5962/p.310430.
- Diment, Judith A.; Humphries, Christopher J.; Newington, Linda; Shaughnessy, Elaine; Press, J. R. (1987). "Catalogue of the Natural History drawings commissioned by Joseph Banks on the Endeavour Voyage 1768–1771 held in the British Museum (Natural History) : Part 2: Botony [sic]: Brazil, Java, Madeira, New Zealand, Society Islands and Tierra del Fuego". Bulletin of the British Museum (Natural History). Historical Series. 12 (Complete). London: British Museum (Natural History): 1–200. doi:10.5962/p.310431.

Geology

- Harvey, Anthony P.; Diment, Judith A., eds. (1979). Geoscience Information : A state-of-the art review : Proceedings of the 1st International Conference on Geological Information: London, 10 – 12 April, 1978. International Conference on Geological Information. Heathfield, East Sussex: The Broad Oak Press. doi:10.1007/978-94-011-7444-2. ISBN 978-0-906716-00-7. OCLC 5573265.

Young adult literature

- ——; Harvey, Anthony (1976). Animals of long ago. Fact Finders. Illustrated by John Sibbick. London: Macmillan Education. ISBN 978-0-333-26155-2. OCLC 16482488.
- ——; Harvey, Anthony (1976). Early Man. Fact Finders. Illustrated by Angus McBride. London: Macmillan Education. ISBN 978-0-382-06621-4. OCLC 11438480.

== Awards ==
- 2020 — Appointed Member of the Most Excellent Order of the British Empire (MBE) in the Queen's 2020 New Year Honours; ″For services to Charity (Berkshire)″.
- 2019 — Honorary Fellow of Aberystwyth University

== Personal life ==
Moved to Maidenhead with her husband Dr Tony Diment in 1982.

Mother to Andrew Diment and Robert Diament.
