= Banks' Florilegium =

Copperplate engravings of plants

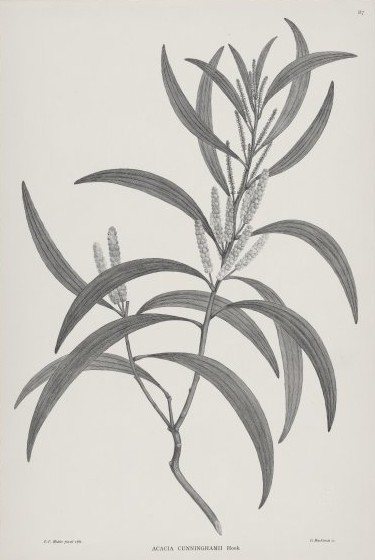
Acacia cunninghamii from the 1900 Illustrations of Australian Plants release of part of Florilegium in black and white

Banks' Florilegium is a collection of copperplate engravings of plants collected by Sir Joseph Banks and Daniel Solander while they accompanied Captain James Cook on his first voyage around the world between 1768 and 1771. They collected plants in Madeira, Brazil, Tierra del Fuego, the Society Islands, New Zealand, Australia and Java. During this voyage, Banks and Solander collected nearly 30,000 dried specimens, eventually leading to the description of 110 new genera and 1300 new species, which increased the known flora of the world by 25 per cent.

Banks's and Solander's specimens were studied aboard the Endeavour by the botanical illustrator Sydney Parkinson. He made 674 detailed drawings of each specimen with notes on their colour, and completed 269 watercolour illustrations before dying of dysentery after the Endeavour left Batavia. When they returned to London in 1771, Banks employed five artists to create watercolours of all of Parkinson's drawings, and 18 engravers to create 743 copperplate line engravings from the completed watercolours at a considerable cost. The engraving work stalled in 1784, and the Florilegium was not printed in Banks's lifetime. On his death in 1820 he bequeathed the plates to the British Museum.

Some of the plates were eventually printed. Between 1900 and 1905, James Britten and the British Museum issued prints of 315 of the plant engravings in black ink, under the title Illustrations of Australian Plants. Others were included in black and white in the 1973 book Captain Cook's Florilegium.

The first complete full-colour edition of the Florilegium was published between 1980 and 1990 in 34 parts by Alecto Historical Editions and the Natural History Museum, London. Only 100 sets were made available for sale, at a cost of about $100,000, some on a subscription basis. The plates were printed using a 17th-century technique known as à la poupée where each colour was applied directly to the plate; colour accuracy was checked against Parkinson's notes and through consultation with the museum's Botanical Editor, Chris Humphries. Each plate took from one week to two months to proof. Chris Humphries worked closely with his colleague, the Botany Librarian Judith Diment, as well as the printers led by Edward Egerton-Williams, the typesetters led by Ian Mortimer and colleagues at Alecto Historical Editions including Nigel Frith, Laurence Hoffman and Elaine Shaughnessy. Parts 1 to 15 consist of 337 plates relating to the Australian flora, parts 16 to 34 include Brazil, Madeira, New Zealand, Java, Society Islands and Tierra del Fuego. Banks' Florilegium is the world's largest 20th-century fine art printing project, and has been exhibited all over the world.

The Alecto Historical edition of Banks' Florilegium was purchased in Australia by the State Library of Victoria, the State Library of New South Wales, and the State Library of Queensland.

A selection of 147 of the plates was printed at three-quarter scale by Thames & Hudson in 2018 as Joseph Banks' Florilegium, with commentaries by botanist David Mabberley and essays by art historian Mel Gooding.

A documentary recounting the journey and the publication of the Florilegium, Banks' Florilegium: The Flowering of the Pacific, was released in 1984. It was narrated by Australian Robert Hughes. A book on the subject, The flowering of the Pacific: Being an account of Joseph Banks' travels in the South Seas and the story of his Florilegium by Brian Adams, was published by the British Museum in 1986. A television mini-series The Lost World of Joseph Banks (2016) explored Banks's life and influence over five episodes.
