= Jens-Christian Svenning =

Danish ecologist, biogeographer and academic

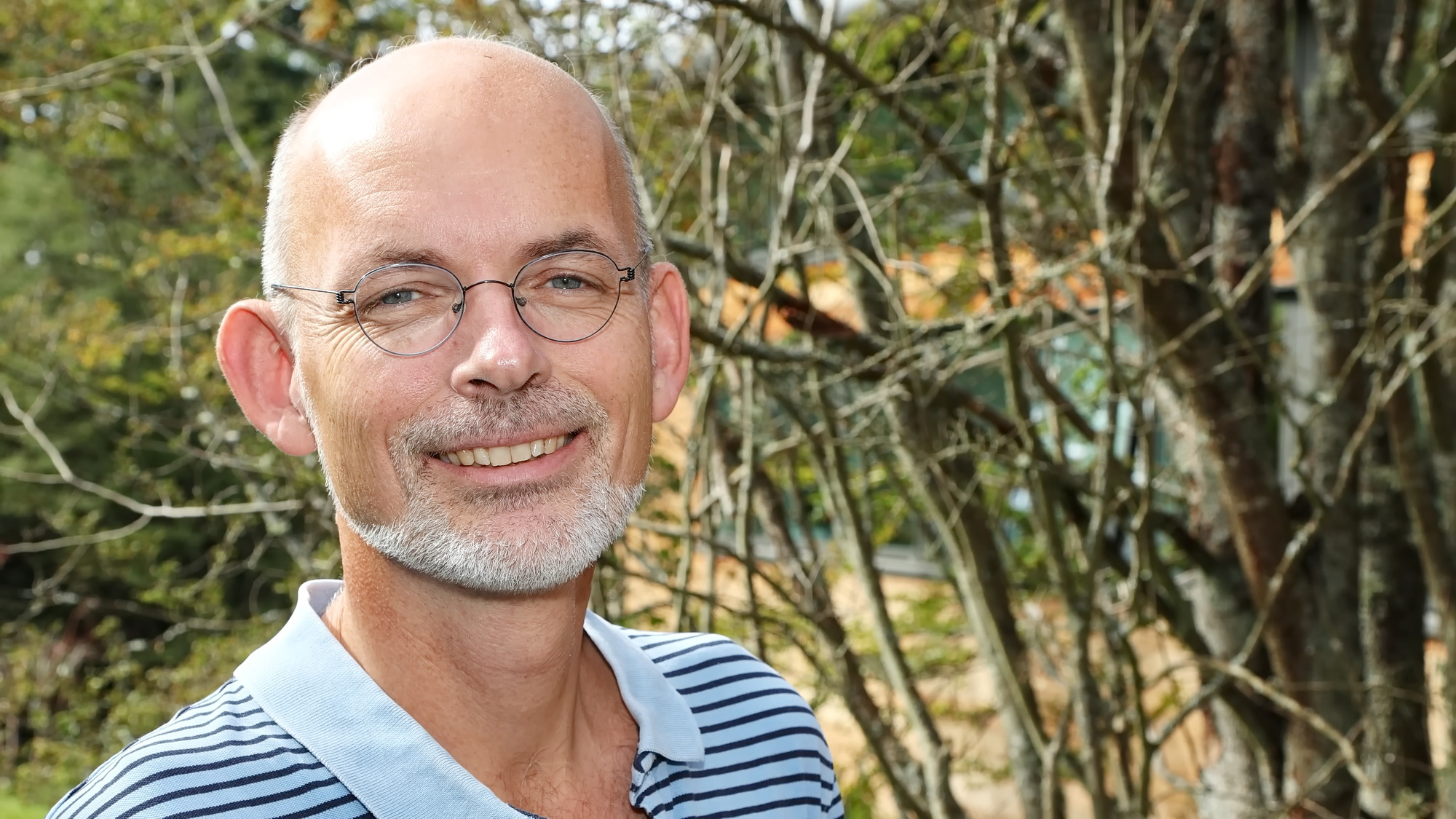
- Born: July 9, 1970 (age 56)
- Occupations: Ecologist and academic
- Awards: Ebbe Nielsen Prize, Global Biodiversity Information Facility (2011); EliteForsk Prize, Danish Ministry of Higher Education and Science (2014); Queen Margrethe II's Science Award, Royal Danish Academy of Sciences and Letters (2016); Distinguished Fellow, Chinese Academy of Sciences (2017); Annual Award in Science and Technology, Villum Foundation (2021); Ernst Haeckel Prize, European Ecological Federation (2022); Carlsberg Foundation Research Prize (2023)

Academic background
- Education: MSc., Biology; PhD., Ecology
- Alma mater: Aarhus University; Indiana University Bloomington
- Thesis: Population and community ecology of Neotropical rain forest palms (Arecaceae) (1999)

Academic work
- Discipline: Macroecology; Biogeography; Global change Restoration and rewilding Human ecology
- Institutions: Aarhus University; Smithsonian Tropical Research Institute

Jens-Christian Svenning is a Danish ecologist, biogeographer and academic. He is a professor at the Department of Biology at Aarhus University, Denmark where he also serves as the director of DNRF Center for Ecological Dynamics in a Novel Biosphere (ECONOVO), established in 2023.

Svenning is known for his research in macroecology, biogeography, biodiversity, the effects of climate change on biomes, rewilding, and human-environment interactions across historical and future contexts with a specific focus on concepts like disequilibrium dynamics and the impacts of top-down trophic processes. In 1995, he collected a specimen of a new species of pepper plant which was named after him as Piper svenningii. He is the recipient of the 2011 Global Biodiversity Information Facility Ebbe Nielsen Prize, the EliteForsk Prize from the Danish Ministry of Higher Education and Science in 2014, the 2016 Royal Danish Academy of Sciences and Letters' Queen Margrethe II's Science Award, Chinese Academy of Sciences' Distinguished Fellow Award in 2017, the 2021 Villum Kann Rasmussen Annual Award in Science and Technology of DKK 5 million, the European Ecological Federation Ernst Haeckel Prize in 2022, and the 2023 Carlsberg Foundation Research Prize.

Svenning was elected as Fellow of the Royal Danish Academy of Sciences and Letters in 2010 and the Danish Academy of Natural Sciences in 2011.

== Education and early career ==
Svenning obtained a MSc in biology in 1997 from Aarhus University. Subsequently, he received a PhD in ecology from Aarhus University in 1999.

== Career ==
Svenning began his academic career in 1999 as an assistant professor at the Department of Biological Sciences at Aarhus University, followed by a postdoctoral position at the Smithsonian Tropical Research Institution during 2000-2002. In 2002, he became assistant professor at Aarhus University, later appointed associate professor in 2005, professor (MSO) in 2009, and has been serving as professor at Aarhus University since 2013.

Svenning served as the director of Center for Biodiversity Dynamics in a Changing World (BIOCHANGE) from 2017 to 2023. In 2023, he was appointed as the director of DNRF Center for Ecological Dynamics in a Novel Biosphere (ECONOVO).

Svenning worked as subject editor of Ecography from 2005 to 2010 and deputy editor-in-chief at the same journal since 2010, and was also associate editor of the Journal of Biogeography from 2007 to 2019. He has served as chair of the Maasai Mara Science and Development Initiative Scientific Board during 2015 – 2018 and since then as chair of the board. He has been serving as the subject editor for the Nordic Journal of Botany since 2007. He has also been on the 15. Juni Fonden Board since 2018, and Rewilding Europe Supervisory Board since 2020. In addition, he was appointed to the Danish Biodiversity Council to provide expert advice to the Danish government and parliament in the Ministry of Environment of Denmark from 2020 to 2024.

== Research ==
Svenning has contributed to the field of ecology by studying macroecology, biogeography, landscape ecology, community ecology, paleoecology, conservation and rewilding, human ecology, ecoinformatics, remote sensing, and global change biology including climate change and alien species invasions. He has utilized and developed Big Data approaches based on large databases to handle and analyze advanced data in his research alongside field-based research.

=== Basic biodiversity science and ecology ===
Svenning has studied basic biodiversity science and ecology throughout his career. As part of an international collaboration, he showed that processes influencing the latitudinal gradient in species richness are complex, with trait diversity in tree assemblages showing patterns consistent with environmental filtering theory at the alpha and beta scales, but no consistent support for any single theory at the gamma scale. He also determined that microhabitat specialization, particularly related to topography, is a key factor in maintaining the diversity of palm species in Yasuní National Park.

=== Past climate change impacts on biodiversity and ecosystems ===
Svenning's work in biogeography has involved using a variety of methods to understand how different factors have influenced the distribution of species and ecosystems over time. Along with his collaborators, he found that plant range sizes are codetermined by habitat area and long and short-term climate stability. He also participated in a study suggesting that past climate changes are linked to reduced spatial turnover and increased nestedness in angiosperm tree diversity worldwide, potentially foreshadowing homogenization and decreased diversity under future human-driven climate change.

=== Impacts of current and future climate change ===
Svenning has examined the impacts of current and future climate change on biodiversity, ecosystems and people in many studies. In a study, he and his team revealed that global warming is leading to significant shifts in the distribution of tropical plant species, with evidence of upward movements of vegetation zones and individual plant taxa up to 500 meters higher in elevation compared to records from 210 years ago. He also contributed to a related European study showing that the rate of increase in plant species richness on mountain summits in Europe has accelerated in recent decades, linked to climate warming. With colleagues, he also determined that past defaunation has severely reduced plant migration rates, which could limit the ability of plant species to adapt to climate change.

Through his work, Svenning emphasized that vegetation will likely experience disequilibrium with climate change, with marked changes at both leading and trailing edges. In a study with Skov, he established that European tree species fill their climatically determined potential ranges by only 38%, suggesting limited tracking of near-future climate changes. Later, together with Seliger, McGill and Gill, he determined that North American trees and shrubs are mostly not fully utilizing their potential climatic niches, with climate explaining only about half of the species' ranges, and small-ranged species showing high levels of climatic disequilibrium likely due to dispersal lags as well as undetected environmental factors or biotic interactions. Additionally, he has contributed to work showing that warming-induced tree and shrub expansion within the Arctic will be limited by dispersal, soil development, and other disequilibrium dynamics, but plantings and unintentional seed dispersal by humans could have large impacts on spread rates. Moreover, as part of a large team, he demonstrated that high-mountain plant species in the European Alps are projected to experience substantial range reductions of around 44-50% by the end of the twenty-first century, with population dynamics lagging behind climatic trends and creating an extinction debt, especially impacting species endemic to the Alps.

=== Megafauna history and ecology ===
Svenning also looked into human-megafauna interactions, megafauna extinctions in recent prehistory, and the ecological role of megafauna in shaping past and present ecosystems. In further collaborative research, he determined that cultural filtering has been the dominant driver of megafauna range contractions in China over the past 2 millennia. With Faurby, he found that human activities have significantly altered Earth's mammal diversity patterns, leading to strong deviations in current patterns compared to their natural state for large-bodied species, emphasizing the need to consider natural distributions for a better understanding of diversity drivers and conservation benchmarks.

More recently, in 2023, Svenning conducted a joint study with Lemoine and Buitenwerf and found that human impact had been the primary driver of late-Quaternary megafauna extinctions, outperforming climatic models. In another collaborative study, he challenged the perception of recent human impact on terrestrial nature, revealing through that nearly three quarters of the Earth's land was inhabited and shaped by human societies over 12,000 years ago. Linked to this work, he and colleagues established that the current rate of extinctions among mammals – across body sizes – suggested that the incipient sixth mass extinction will lead to the loss of a significant amount of phylogenetic diversity, which will take millions of years to recover even if extinction rates revert to pre-human levels.

Furthermore, with colleagues, Svenning identified the presence of abundant and diverse large herbivores in Great Britain during the Last Interglacial period alongside high structural diversity in vegetation. In an earlier review in 2002, he estimated that closed forests would have predominated in north-western Europe under existing natural conditions, but open vegetation would also be frequent in varied settings and maintained by large herbivores and fire. In 2023, in work led by Pearce, he and colleagues showed based on extensive pollen records that substantial light woodland and open vegetation characterized the temperate forest biome in Europe during the Last Interglacial, suggesting the rich megafauna as a likely key driver of this structure.

=== Rewilding and conservation ===
Svenning has studied rewilding and conservation. He has proposed that trophic rewilding via restoring top-down trophic interactions and associated trophic cascades is a promising strategy to promote self-regulating biodiverse ecosystems, and that it could be a powerful tool for mitigating the impacts of human-induced global change on biodiversity and ecosystems. With colleagues, he further provided a definition and guiding principles that clarify the concept for understanding of rewilding as a continuum of scale and human influence, emphasizing ecosystem restoration to achieve autonomous nature, and emphasizing rewilding as a central approach to ecosystem restoration to promote ecological resilience.

=== Globalization and alien species invasions ===
Svenning has explored globalization, alien species invasions and related issues such as biotic homogenization. In a study published in Nature, he and Fricke demonstrated that human-induced species introductions are leading to the homogenization of global ecological networks, diminishing beta diversity among local networks and modularity within networks, with potential consequences for ecosystem resilience and coevolutionary dynamics.

In a joint study, Svenning revealed that human activities in China have caused narrow-ranged plant species to fill their climatic potential ranges to a lesser extent than widespread species, leading to a risk of biotic homogenization also among native species.

In a collaborative study, Svenning highlighted the potential of megaherbivores in managing plant invasions and promoting native plant diversity, particularly in protected areas with high megaherbivore densities and mid-productive ecosystems, supporting the concept of trophic rewilding.

=== Human ecology ===
Svenning's research in human ecology focuses on the history of environmental transformation and the relationship between human beings and the natural environment. In a joint study, he determined that childhood exposure to green spaces is linked to a reduced risk of a broad variety of psychiatric disorders later in life, underscoring the importance of incorporating natural environments into urban planning and childhood experiences for improved mental health. As part of a team, he also found that climate change is shifting the human climate niche at an unprecedented rate, with potentially devastating consequences for the poorest regions of the world, and that it could push one-third of humanity outside the human climate niche by end-of-century under current policies, but reducing warming to 1.5 °C would limit exposure to unprecedented heat to 5%.

=== Ecoinformatics and remote sensing ===
Svenning has integrated use of remote sensing and ecoinformatics into his research to better understand ecological patterns and processes. In a collaborative research, with colleagues he showed that using a multilevel approach with satellite data can significantly enhance the prediction of household wealth in rural areas, aiding the monitoring of poverty-related Sustainable Development Goals (SDGs). Together with colleagues, he has contributed to the development of several larger databases on biodiversity data such as PHYLACINE, which contained phylogenies, range maps, trait data, and threat status for all known mammal species, taking into account human impacts. Additionally, jointly with his team he also developed the TREECHANGE database, as well as the Botanical Information Ecology Network (BIEN) where ecologists, botanists and computer scientists assemble worldwide data on plant geographic distribution, diversity, and functionality.

== Awards and honors ==
- 2011 – Ebbe Nielsen Prize, Global Biodiversity Information Facility
- 2014 – EliteForsk Prize, Danish Ministry of Higher Education and Science
- 2016 – Queen Margrethe II's Science Award, Royal Danish Academy of Sciences and Letters
- 2017 – Distinguished Fellow, Chinese Academy of Sciences
- 2021 – Annual Award in Science and Technology, Villum Foundation
- 2022 – Ernst Haeckel Prize, European Ecological Federation
- 2023 – Carlsberg Foundation Research Prize

== Selected articles ==
*Svenning, J. C., & Skov, F. (2004). Limited filling of the potential range in European tree species. Ecology Letters, 7(7), pages 565-573.

- Sandel, B., Arge, L., Dalsgaard, B., Davies, R. G., Gaston, K. J., Sutherland, W. J., & Svenning, J. C. (2011). The influence of Late Quaternary climate-change velocity on species endemism. Science, 334(6056), pages 660-664.
- Svenning, J. C., & Sandel, B. (2013). Disequilibrium vegetation dynamics under future climate change. American Journal of Botany, 100(7), pages 1266-1286.
- Lenoir, J., & Svenning, J. C. (2015). Climate‐related range shifts–a global multidimensional synthesis and new research directions. Ecography, 38(1), pages 15–28.
- Svenning, J. C., Eiserhardt, W. L., Normand, S., Ordonez, A., & Sandel, B. (2015). The influence of paleoclimate on present-day patterns in biodiversity and ecosystems. Annual Review of Ecology, Evolution, and Systematics, 46, pages 551-572.
- Svenning, J. C., Pedersen, P. B., Donlan, C. J., Ejrnæs, R., Faurby, S., Galetti, M., ... & Vera, F. W. (2016). Science for a wilder Anthropocene: Synthesis and future directions for trophic rewilding research. Proceedings of the National Academy of Sciences, 113(4), pages 898-906.
- Engemann, K., Pedersen, C. B., Arge, L., Tsirogiannis, C., Mortensen, P. B., & Svenning, J. C. (2019). Residential green space in childhood is associated with lower risk of psychiatric disorders from adolescence into adulthood. Proceedings of the national academy of sciences, 116(11), pages 5188-5193.
- Fricke, E. C., Ordonez, A., Rogers, H. S., & Svenning, J. C. (2022). The effects of defaunation on plants' capacity to track climate change. Science, 375(6577), pages 210-214.
- Mungi, N. A., Jhala, Y. V., Qureshi, Q., le Roux, E., & Svenning, J. C. (2023). Megaherbivores provide biotic resistance against alien plant dominance. Nature Ecology & Evolution, pages 1–9.
- Li, W., Guo, W. Y., Pasgaard, M., Niu, Z., Wang, L., Chen, F., ... & Svenning, J. C. (2023). Human fingerprint on structural density of forests globally. Nature Sustainability, pages 1–12.
- Lenton, T. M., Xu, C., Abrams, J. F., Ghadiali, A., Loriani, S., Sakschewski, B., ... & Scheffer, M. (2023). Quantifying the human cost of global warming. Nature Sustainability, pages 1–11.
