= Neomintho =

Scientific classification
- Kingdom: Animalia
- Phylum: Arthropoda
- Class: Insecta
- Order: Diptera
- Family: Tachinidae
- Subfamily: Exoristinae
- Tribe: Euthelairini
- Genus: Neomintho; Brauer & von Berganstamm, 1891

Type species
- Tachina macilenta Wiedemann, 1830

Synonyms
- Eupelecotheca Townsend, 1919; Euthelairopsis Townsend, 1927; Pantagathus Reinhard, 1935; Pelocotheca Neave, 1940

Genus of flies

Neomintho is a genus of flies in the family Tachinidae.

== Species ==
- Neomintho albocingulata (Wulp, 1890)
- Neomintho celeris (Townsend, 1919)
- Neomintho curulis (Reinhard, 1943)
- Neomintho cylindrata (Wulp, 1892)
- Neomintho macilenta (Wiedemann, 1830)
- Neomintho nobilis (Williston, 1896)
