= Nielsen Prize =

Nielsen Prize may refer to:

- Carl Nielsen Prize, named for Carl Nielsen
- Ebbe Nielsen Prize
- Flora Nielsen Recital Prize
- Aarhus International Piano Competition
