= Scott Taylor =

Scott Taylor may refer to:

== Sport ==
- Scott Taylor (Australian footballer) (born 1976), Australian rules footballer for the Western Bulldogs
- Scott Taylor (darts player) (born 1991), English darts player
- Scott Taylor (footballer, born 1970), English football player
- Scott Taylor (footballer, born 1976), English football player
- Scott Taylor (left-handed pitcher) (born 1967), American pitcher for the Boston Red Sox, 1992–1993
- Scott Taylor (pentathlete) (1945–2023), American modern pentathlete
- Scott Taylor (racing driver) (born 1955), American off-road racing driver
- Scott Taylor (right-handed pitcher) (born 1966), American pitcher for the Texas Rangers, 1995
- Scott Taylor (rugby league) (born 1991), English rugby league player for Hull FC
- Scott Taylor (wrestler) (born 1973), American professional wrestler best known as Scotty 2 Hotty

== Other occupations ==
- Scott Taylor (British Army NCO), TRiM (Trauma Risk Management)Training Commander
- Scott Taylor (actor) (born 1982), English actor
- Scott Taylor (biologist), Canadian biologist at the University of Colorado
- Scott Taylor (journalist) (born 1960), Canadian journalist
- Scott Taylor (politician) (born 1979), American politician in Virginia
- Scott Taylor (writer), Australian television writer
- M. Scott Taylor (born 1960), Canadian economist
- Scott Taylor (1961 – 2020), English guitarist and member of Then Jerico

== Other uses ==
- "Scott Taylor", a song by Colonel Claypool's Bucket of Bernie Brains from the album The Big Eyeball in the Sky

== See also ==
- Tayler Scott (born 1992), South African baseball pitcher
- Taylor Scott (1946–1987), British test pilot
- Terry Scott Taylor (born 1950), American songwriter, record producer, and writer
