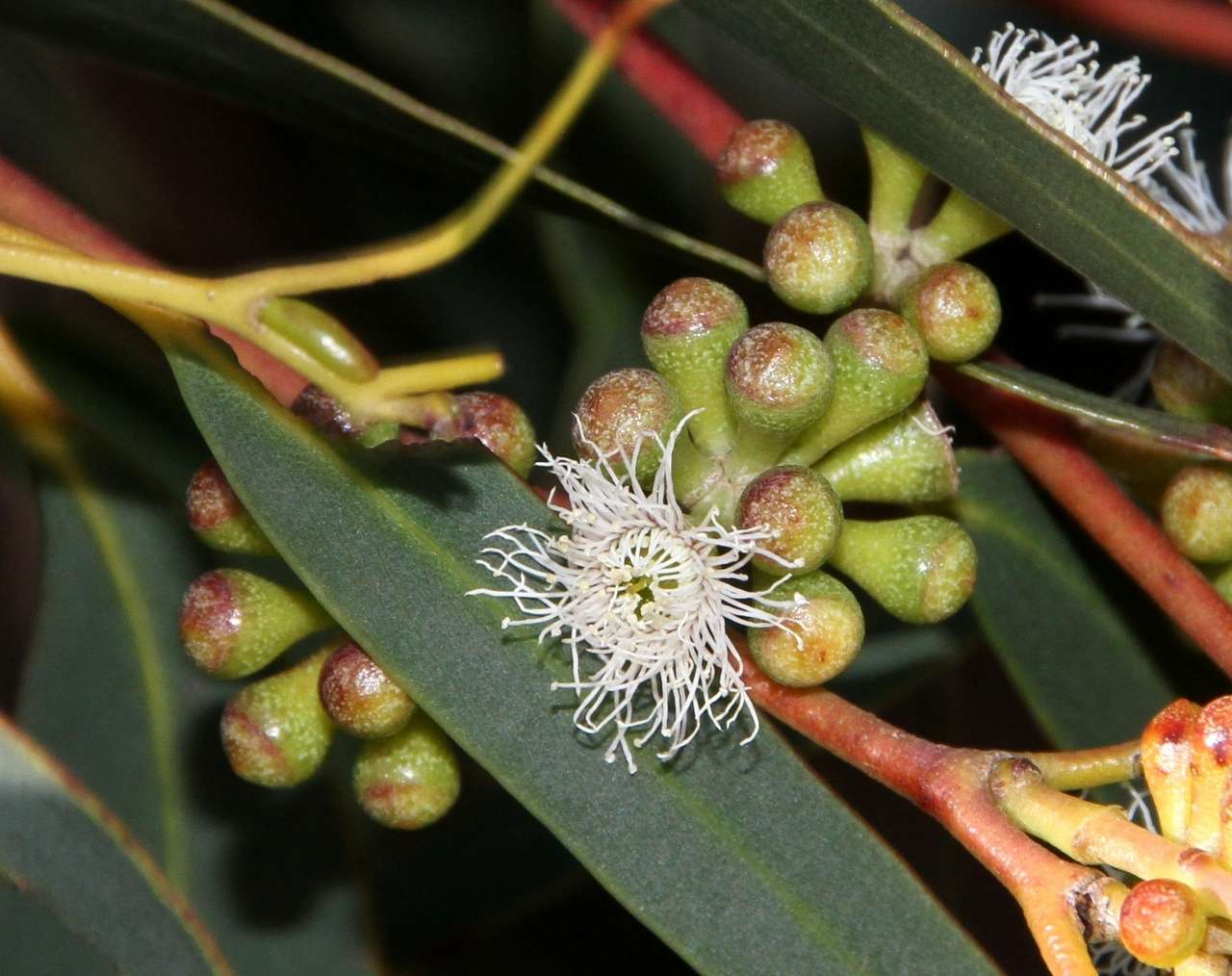
- Flower buds of E. willisii in Wilsons Promontory N.P.

Scientific classification
- Kingdom: Plantae
- Clade: Embryophytes
- Clade: Tracheophytes
- Clade: Spermatophytes
- Clade: Angiosperms
- Clade: Eudicots
- Clade: Rosids
- Order: Myrtales
- Family: Myrtaceae
- Genus: Eucalyptus
- Species: E. willisii

Binomial name
- Eucalyptus willisii Ladiges, Humphries & Brooker

= Eucalyptus willisii =

Shining peppermint

Species of eucalyptus

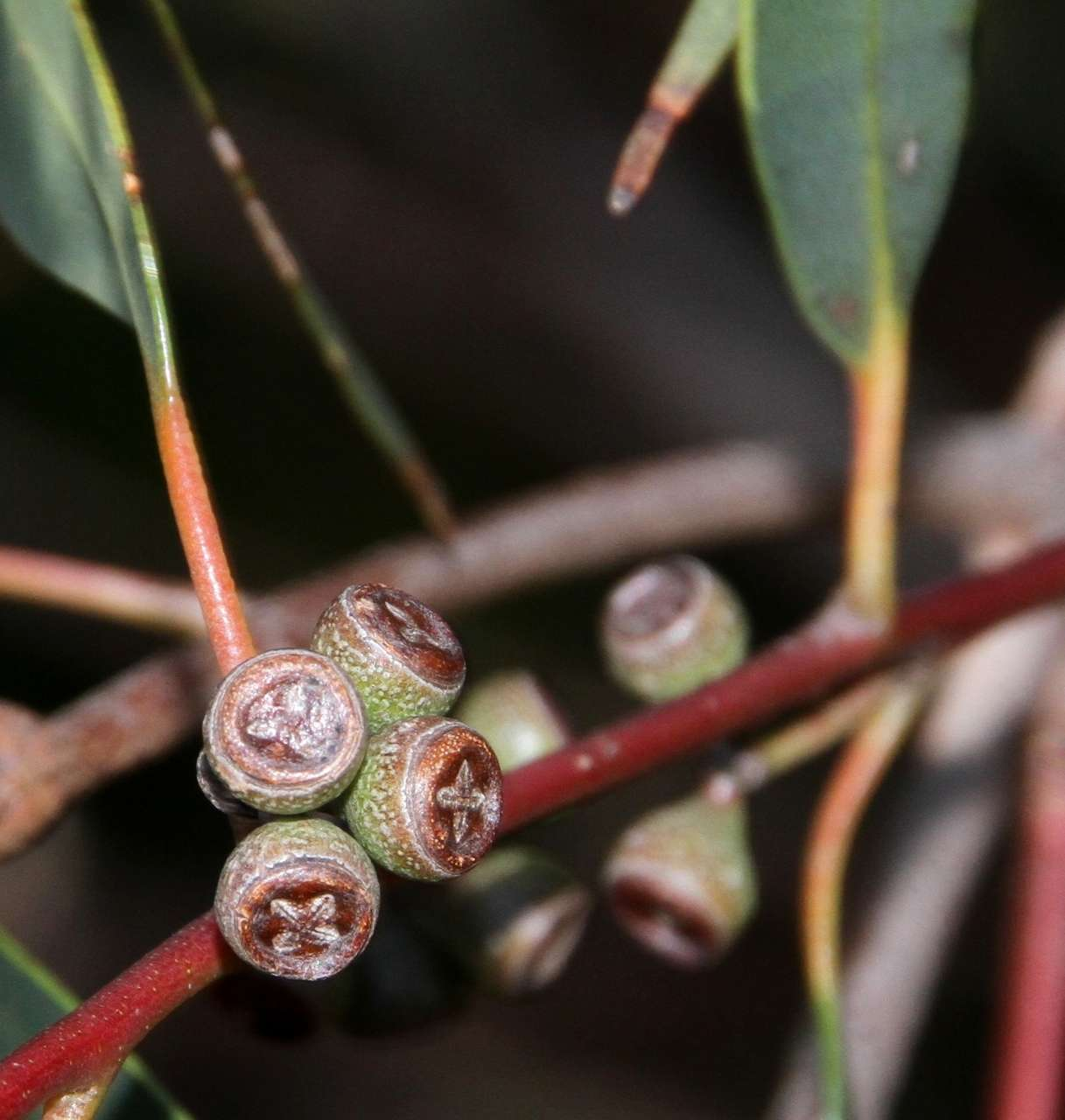
Fruit

Eucalyptus willisii, also known as shining peppermint or promontory peppermint, is a species of small to medium-sized tree, sometimes a mallee that is endemic to Victoria, Australia. It has rough, fibrous bark on the trunk and branches, lance-shaped to curved adult leaves, flower buds in groups of eleven to twenty five, white flowers and cup-shaped or hemispherical fruit.

== Description ==
Eucalyptus willisii is a tree or a mallee that typically grows to a height of 10 m (33 ft) and forms a lignotuber. It has rough, fibrous bark on the trunk and larger branches. Young plants and coppice regrowth have slightly glossy, sessile, lance-shaped or curved leaves that are 64–85 mm (2.5–3.3 in) long, 18–29 mm (0.71–1.14 in) wide and arranged in opposite pairs. Adult leaves are arranged alternately, the same shade of dull to slightly glossy blue-green on both sides, 60–170 mm (2.4–6.7 in) long and 7–23 mm (0.28–0.91 in) wide tapering to a petiole 6–18 mm (0.24–0.71 in) long. The flower buds are arranged in leaf axils in groups of eleven to twenty five on an unbranched peduncle 2–8 mm (0.079–0.315 in) long, the individual buds on pedicels 2–4 mm (0.079–0.157 in) long. Mature buds are oval to club-shaped, 3–5 mm (0.12–0.20 in) long and about 3 mm (0.12 in) wide with a hemispherical operculum. Flowering occurs from September to January and the flowers are white. The fruit is a woody cup-shaped capsule 4–6 mm (0.16–0.24 in) long and wide on a pedicel 1–4 mm (0.039–0.157 in) long with three or four valves near rim level. The seeds are smooth and glossy, brown to dark brown and pyramid-shaped but are distorted along one curved face.

== Taxonomy and naming ==
Eucalyptus willisii was first formally described in 1983 by Pauline Ladiges, Chris Humphries and Ian Brooker in the Australian Journal of Botany from specimens collected near Mount Oberon in Wilsons Promontory National Park in 1982. The specific epithet (willisii) honours James Hamlyn Willis (1910 – 1995).

== Distribution ==
The shining peppermint is endemic to Victoria from Cranbourne to around Bairnsdale in the west, and south to Wilsons Promontory where it is found growing in sandy areas or on granite hills in scrubland communities.

== See also ==
- List of Eucalyptus species
