= Steve Portugal =

British scientist

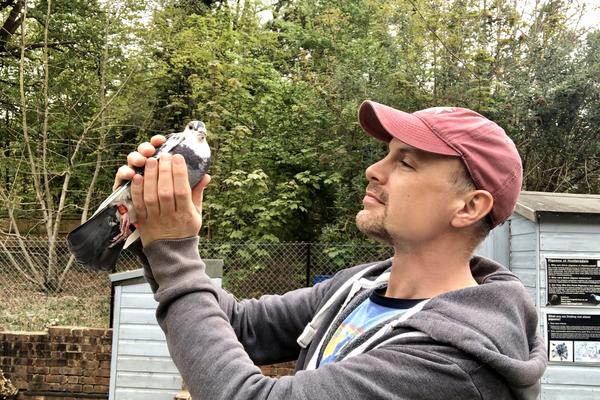
- Portugal in 2022
- Born: November 1979 (age 46); London, UK
- Citizenship: British
- Known for: Zoological Research
- Awards: Bicentenary Medal (2019)
- Scientific career
- Fields: Aerodynamics, Animal Behaviour, Biomechanics, Sensory Ecology
- Workplaces: The University of Oxford
- Thesis: (2008)
- Doctoral advisor: Prof. Patrick Butler
- Website: www.biology.ox.ac.uk/people/steve-portugal

Steve Portugal is a British zoologist and animal physiologist working in avian energetics and behavioral physiology.

== Education and career ==
Portugal was educated at The University of Wales Aberystwyth where he was awarded a BSc in Marine and Freshwater Biology with Zoology in 2001, and The University of Wales Bangor where he did an MSc in Ecology in 2003. He was awarded his PhD in 2008 at The University of Birmingham studying the "Ecophysiological aspects of the annual cycle of barnacle geese". In 2014 was appointed as a Lecturer at Royal Holloway University of London, where in 2018 he was promoted to Reader. In 2024 he was appointed Associate Professor of Animal Behaviour at The University of Oxford and St Hugh's College.

== Research ==
His research looks at animal behaviour and physiology, and he has published over 100 academic papers.

He has looked at the energy expenditure of migratory birds and the physiology of feather moult, by tracking wild barnacle geese (Branta leucopsis) from Svalbard to Scotland, using biologging technology. Portugal's team have studied avian vision, and the sensory ecology behind collisions with anthropogenic objects, notably with birds of prey. Portugal has studied the etiquette of aggression in Siamese fighting fish (Betta splendens), and the developmental energetics of avian brood parasites.

Much of Portugal's work has focused on avian flight and aerodynamics. His research has shown how birds fly in V-formation, using Northern bald ibis (Geronticus eremita) that were part of a European reintroduction scheme. His team has worked extensively with homing pigeons (Columba livia), demonstrating how individuals compromise on speed to stay together as a flock, and the increased energy expenditure required to fly as a group.

Other work has focused on the eggshell collection at The Natural History Museum, where Portugal is a Scientific Associate, demonstrating how eggshell properties have evolved. Work with secretary birds (Sagittarius serpentarius) demonstrated their capacity to deliver a kick 5 times their own body weight, while his studies on African harrier-hawks (Polyboroides typus) showed their unique visual system designed to support their unusual foraging technique of extracting food from tree holes.

In 2019 he was awarded the Bicentenary Medal of the Linnean Society, awarded annually in recognition of work done by a biologist under the age of 40 years. He has appeared in numerous nature documentaries, including David Attenborough's Natural Curiosities. Portugal is very active in writing popular science articles, writing about migration for the British Trust for Ornithology, eggshells for Birdguides, Cassowaries for BBC Wildlife magazine, and numerous pieces for The Conversation.

== Awards ==
- Bicentenary medal (2019).
