= Cerotachina =

Scientific classification
- Kingdom: Animalia
- Phylum: Arthropoda
- Class: Insecta
- Order: Diptera
- Family: Tachinidae
- Subfamily: Exoristinae
- Tribe: Euthelairini
- Genus: Cerotachina; Arnaud, 1963

Genus of flies

Cerotachina is a genus of flies in the family Tachinidae.

== Species ==
- Cerotachina albula Arnaud, 1963
- Cerotachina elegantula Arnaud, 1963
