= Euthelaira =

Scientific classification
- Kingdom: Animalia
- Phylum: Arthropoda
- Class: Insecta
- Order: Diptera
- Family: Tachinidae
- Subfamily: Exoristinae
- Tribe: Euthelairini
- Genus: Euthelaira; Townsend, 1912

Type species
- Euthelaira inambarica Townsend, 1912

Genus of flies

Euthelaira is a genus of flies in the family Tachinidae.

== Species ==
- Euthelaira inambarica Townsend, 1912
- Euthelaira rufilabris (Wulp, 1890)
