= Pelecotheca =

Scientific classification
- Kingdom: Animalia
- Phylum: Arthropoda
- Class: Insecta
- Order: Diptera
- Family: Tachinidae
- Subfamily: Exoristinae
- Tribe: Euthelairini
- Genus: Pelecotheca; Townsend, 1919

Type species
- Pelecotheca panamensis Townsend, 1919

Synonyms
- Adercomyia Arnaud, 1963

Genus of flies

Pelecotheca is a genus of flies in the family Tachinidae.

== Species ==
- Pelecotheca biseta (Arnaud, 1963)
- Pelecotheca flavipes Thompson, 1968
- Pelecotheca macilenta (Wulp, 1890)
- Pelecotheca macra (Wulp, 1890)
- Pelecotheca panamensis Townsend, 1919
- Pelecotheca paulensis Townsend, 1929
- Pelecotheca sabroskyi (Arnaud, 1963)
- Pelecotheca trinidadensis Thompson, 1968
