= Iteuthelaira =

Scientific classification
- Kingdom: Animalia
- Phylum: Arthropoda
- Class: Insecta
- Order: Diptera
- Family: Tachinidae
- Subfamily: Exoristinae
- Tribe: Euthelairini
- Genus: Iteuthelaira; Townsend, 1927

Type species
- Iteuthelaira intermedia Townsend, 1927

Genus of flies

Iteuthelaira is a genus of flies in the family Tachinidae.

== Species ==
- Iteuthelaira chaetosa Townsend, 1929
- Iteuthelaira esuriens (Fabricius, 1805)
