= BioStor =

Archive of biodiversity-related scientific papers

BioStor is a free-to-access archive of biodiversity-related scientific papers, in the Biodiversity Heritage Library. It was created and is operated by Roderic Page.
