= Vince Smith (cybertaxonomist) =

British entomologist

- Education: University of Bristol (BSc); University of Glasgow (PhD)
- Awards: Bicentenary Medal of the Linnean Society; Ebbe Nielsen Prize
- Scientific career
- Fields: Biodiversity Informatics; Entomology; Taxonomy; Lice
- Workplaces: Natural History Museum, London, Illinois Natural History Survey, University of Glasgow
- Thesis: Avian louse phylogeny (Phthiraptera: Ischnocera) (2000)
- Website: vsmith.info

Vince Smith (Vincent Stuart Smith) is a British entomologist and biodiversity informatician at the Natural History Museum, London.

== Education and career ==
Smith completed a bachelor's degree at the University of Bristol, before completing a PhD at the University of Glasgow specialising on parasitic lice (Phthiraptera). He went on to research host-parasite evolution at the University of Glasgow and then the Illinois Natural History Survey, where he helped develop the Biocorder laboratory management software. In 2006, he joined the Natural History Museum, London, as a cybertaxonomist, before becoming a Research Leader in Informatics in 2012 (a position he still holds).

Smith was one of the founding editors of the Biodiversity Data Journal and has led several large EU science projects including SYNTHESYS+ and ViBRANT.

== Research ==
Smith's current research interest is in the field of biodiversity informatics including work relating to implementing Biodiversity Information Standards (TDWG), development of the museum's Data Portal to make collections available online, as well as methods for digitising museum specimens. Informatics projects for the broader community include development of the Scratchpads virtual research environment and the eMonocot project.

== Honours and awards ==
- Bicentenary Medal of the Linnean Society in 2015
- Ebbe Nielsen Prize in 2008
