= Neominthoidea =

Scientific classification
- Kingdom: Animalia
- Phylum: Arthropoda
- Class: Insecta
- Order: Diptera
- Family: Tachinidae
- Subfamily: Exoristinae
- Tribe: Euthelairini
- Genus: Neominthoidea; Thompson, 1968

Type species
- Neominthoidea trinidadensis Thompson, 1968

Genus of flies

Neominthoidea is a genus of flies in the family Tachinidae.

== Species ==
- Neominthoidea trinidadensis Thompson, 1968

== Distribution ==
Trinidad and Tobago.
