= Cryptocladocera =

Scientific classification
- Kingdom: Animalia
- Phylum: Arthropoda
- Clade: Pancrustacea
- Class: Insecta
- Order: Diptera
- Family: Tachinidae
- Subfamily: Exoristinae
- Tribe: Euthelairini
- Genus: Cryptocladocera; Bezzi, 1923

Type species
- Cryptocladocera prodigiosa Bezzi, 1923

Genus of flies

Cryptocladocera is a genus of flies in the family Tachinidae.

== Species ==
- Cryptocladocera arnaudi Santis & Alvarez-Garcia, 2020
- Cryptocladocera bezzii Arnaud, 1963
- Cryptocladocera mojingensis Arnaud, 1963
- Cryptocladocera pichilinguensis Arnaud, 1963
- Cryptocladocera prodigiosa Bezzi, 1923
