= Ebbe Nielsen Challenge =

Danish competition and awards for biodiversity informatics

The Ebbe Nielsen Challenge is an international science competition conducted annually from 2015 onwards by the Global Biodiversity Information Facility (GBIF), with a set of cash prizes that recognize researcher(s)' submissions in creating software or approaches that successfully address a GBIF-issued challenge in the field of biodiversity informatics. It succeeds the Ebbe Nielsen Prize, which was awarded annually by GBIF between 2002 and 2014. The name of the challenge honours the memory of prominent entomologist and biodiversity informatics proponent Ebbe Nielsen, who died of a heart attack in the U.S.A. en route to the 2001 GBIF Governing Board meeting.

== History ==
In 2001, GBIF created the Ebbe Nielsen Prize to honour the recently deceased Danish-Australian entomologist Ebbe Nielsen, who was a keen proponent of both GBIF and the biodiversity informatics discipline. That prize recognized a global researcher or research team for their retrospective contribution(s) to the field of biodiversity informatics, according to criteria set out by GBIF in the terms of the award. From 2015 onwards, GBIF re-launched the award process as a competition between global individuals or teams of researchers to create new software or approaches to using biodiversity data according to a theme announced annually for each round of the competition, and also to split the prize money among multiple groups instead of a single winner as in the initial era of the Prize. Calls for entries to the competition, now called the "Ebbe Nielsen Challenge", have been issued annually from 2015 to the present, with winners announced through a competitive process in all years except for 2017, when an insufficient number of entries was received.

== List of winners, 2015 onwards ==
=== 2015 ===
Challenge: "Make significant use of GBIF-mediated data in a way that provides new representations or insights. Your submission could involve a range of results—websites, stand-alone or mobile applications, or outputs of analyses—or could seek to improve any number of issues or processes, including (but not limited to) data analysis or visualization, data workflows, uploading, or annotations."

A list of finalists for the 2015 Challenge is available here.

First Prize winner:

- "GBIF Dataset Metrics" - Peter Desmet, Bart Aelterman and Nicolas Noé (Belgium)

Second Prize winner:

- "BioGUID.org" - Richard Pyle (United States)

Details are available via the GBIF website here.

=== 2016 ===
Challenge: "In 2016, the Challenge will focus on the question of data gaps and completeness, seeking tools, methods and mechanisms to help analyse the fitness-for-use of GBIF-mediated data and/or guide priority setting for biodiversity data mobilization. We expect both data users and data holders to benefit from this year’s emphasis on gaps and completeness."

First Prize winner:

- "Exploring ignorance in space and time" - Alejandro Ruete (Argentina)

Joint Second Prize winners:

- "sampbias" - Alexander Zizka, Alexandre Antonelli and Daniele Silvestro (Sweden)
- "GBIF Coverage Assessment Tools" - Walter Jetz, Jeremy Malczyk, Carsten Meyer, Michelle Duong, Ajay Ranipeta and Luis J. Villanueva (United States, South Africa and Germany)

Details are available via the GBIF website here.

=== 2017 ===
Challenge: "The 2017 GBIF Ebbe Nielsen Challenge seeks submissions that repurpose these datasets [in public open-access repositories] and adapting them into the Darwin Core Archive format (DwC-A), the interoperable and reusable standard that powers the publication of almost 800 million species occurrence records from the nearly 1,000 worldwide institutions now active in the GBIF network. The 2017 Ebbe Nielsen Challenge will task developers and data scientists to create web applications, scripts or other tools that automate the discovery and extraction of relevant biodiversity data from open data repositories."

No winners were announced, indicating that the 2017 prize money was not awarded to any entry.

=== 2018 ===
Challenge: "The 2018 Ebbe Nielsen Challenge is deliberately open-ended, so entrants have a broad remit for creating tools and techniques that advance in open science and improve the access, utility or quality of GBIF-mediated data. Challenge submissions may be new applications, visualization methods, workflows or analyses, or they build on and extend existing tools and features."

Joint First Prize winners:

- "Checklist recipe: a template for reproducible standardization of species checklist data" - Lien Reyserhove, Damiano Oldoni and Peter Desmet (Belgium)
- "Ozymandias: a biodiversity knowledge graph" - Roderic D. M. Page (United Kingdom)

Joint Second Prize winners:

- "The bdverse" - Tomer Gueta, Yohay Carmel, Vijay Barve, Thiloshon Nagarajah, Povilas Gibas, Ashwin Agrawal (Israel, United States, Sri Lanka, Lithuania and India)
- "GBIF Issues Explorer" - Luis J. Villanueva (United States)
- "Smart mosquito trap to DwC pipeline" - Connor Howington and Samuel Rund (United States)
- "Taxonomy Tree Editor" - Ashish Singh Tomar (Spain)

Details are available via the GBIF website here.

=== 2019 ===
Challenge: "The 2019 Ebbe Nielsen Challenge is deliberately open-ended, so entrants have a broad remit for creating tools and techniques that advance in open science and improve the access, utility or quality of GBIF-mediated data. Challenge submissions may be new applications, visualization methods, workflows or analyses, or they build on and extend existing tools and features. It is expected that successful entries provide practical, pragmatic solutions for the GBIF network while advancing biodiversity informatics and biodiversity data management in relation to the GBIF mission and strategic plan."

First Prize winner:

- "WhereNext: a recommending system to identify sampling priorities based on generalized dissimilarity modeling" - Jorge Velásquez-Tibatá (Colombia)

Joint Second Prize winners:

- "occCite: Tools to Enable Comprehensive Biodiversity Data Citation" - Hannah L. Owens, Cory Merow, Brian S. Maitner, Vijay V. Barve & Robert Guralnick (Denmark, United States)
- "Organella" - Andrea Biedermann, Diana Gert, Dimitar Ruszev & Paul Roeder (Germany)
- "Rapid Least Concern: Automated assessments of lower risk plants for the IUCN Red List of Threatened Species (Red List)" - Steven Bachman, Barnaby Walker & Justin Moat (United Kingdom)

Joint Third Prize winners:

- "Agile GBIF Publishing" - Evgeniy Meyke (Finland)
- "Biodiversity Information Review and Decision Support: the BIRDS package for R" - Debora Arlt, Alejandro Ruete & Anton Hammarström (Sweden)
- "GB Sifter: A GBIF to GenBank Data Sifter" - Luis Allende (United States)
- "naturaList" - Arthur Vinicius Rodrigues & Gabriel Nakamura (Brazil)
- "GeoNature-atlas: Publish an online biodiversity atlas with GBIF data of your area" - Jordan Sellies, Amandine Sahl (France)

Details are available via the GBIF website here.

=== 2020 ===
Challenge: "The 2020 Ebbe Nielsen Challenge is deliberately open-ended, so entrants have a broad remit for creating tools and techniques that advance in open science and improve the access, utility or quality of GBIF-mediated data. Challenge submissions may be new applications, visualization methods, workflows or analyses, or they build on and extend existing tools and features. It is expected that successful entries provide practical, pragmatic solutions for the GBIF network while advancing biodiversity informatics and biodiversity data management in relation to the GBIF mission and strategic plan."

First Prize winner:

- "ShinyBIOMOD: An R application for modelling species distribution" - Ian Ondo, Wilfried Thuiller, Maya Gueguen, Alexandre Antonelli & Samuel Pironon (United Kingdom, France, Sweden)

Joint Second Prize winners:

- "Linking nomenclature to type specimens" - Maarten Trekels (Belgium)
- "InteractIAS: A Jupyter notebook to support expert risk assessment on invasive species" - Quentin Groom (Belgium, South Africa)

Joint Third Prize winners:

- "DNA barcode browser" - Roderic D. M. Page (United Kingdom)
- "Voyager" - Ivvet Abdullah-Modinou & Ben Scott (United Kingdom)
- "Mass Georeferencing Tool" - Luis J. Villanueva (United States)

Details are available via the GBIF website here.

=== 2021 ===
Challenge: "The 2021 Ebbe Nielsen Challenge is deliberately open-ended, so entrants have a broad remit for creating tools and techniques that advance in open science and improve the access, utility or quality of GBIF-mediated data. Challenge submissions may be new applications, visualization methods, workflows or analyses, or they build on and extend existing tools and features. It is expected that successful entries provide practical, pragmatic solutions for the GBIF network while advancing biodiversity informatics and biodiversity data management in relation to the GBIF mission and strategic plan."

First Prize winner:

- "Bio-Dem: Biodiversity knowledge & democracy" - Alexander Zizka, Oskar Rydén, Daniel Edler, Johannes Klein, Staffan Lindberg & Alexandre Antonelli (Germany, Sweden, United Kingdom)

Joint Second Prize winners:

- "Locating KBAs: An automated workflow for identifying potential Key Biodiversity Areas" - Daniela Linero Triana (Colombia)
- "plantR: An R package for managing species records from biological collections" - Renato A. Ferreira de Lima, Andrea Sánchez-Tapia, Sara R. Mortara, Hans ter Steege & Marinez F. de Siqueira (Brazil, Netherlands)

Details are available via the GBIF website here.

=== 2022 ===
Challenge: "The 2022 Ebbe Nielsen Challenge is deliberately open-ended, so entrants have a broad remit for creating tools and techniques that advance in open science and improve the access, utility or quality of GBIF-mediated data. Challenge submissions may be new applications, visualization methods, workflows or analyses, or they build on and extend existing tools and features. It is expected that successful entries provide practical, pragmatic solutions for the GBIF network while advancing biodiversity informatics and biodiversity data management in relation to the GBIF mission and strategic plan."

Joint First Prize winners:

- "bdc: A toolkit for standardizing, integrating and cleaning biodiversity data" - Bruno R. Ribeiro, Santiago José Elías Velazco, Karlo Guidoni-Martins, Geiziane Tessarolo, Lucas Jardim, Steven P. Bachman & Rafael Loyola (Brazil, Argentina, United Kingdom)
- "GridDER: Grid Detection and Evaluation in R" - Xiao Feng, Tainá Rocha, Hanna T Thammavong, Rima Tulaiha, Xin Chen, Yingying Xie & Daniel Park (United States, Brazil)

Second Prize winner:

- "GBIF LACS: GBIF Literature Abstract Classification System" - Ángel Luis Robles Fernández & Nathan Upham (United States)

Details are available via the GBIF website here.

=== 2023 ===
Challenge: "The 2023 Ebbe Nielsen Challenge is deliberately open-ended, so entrants have a broad remit for creating tools and techniques that advance in open science and improve the access, utility or quality of GBIF-mediated data. Challenge submissions may be new applications, visualization methods, workflows or analyses, or they build on and extend existing tools and features. It is expected that successful entries provide practical, pragmatic solutions for the GBIF network while advancing biodiversity informatics and biodiversity data management in relation to the GBIF strategic framework."

First Prize winner:

- "GBIF Alert: an open-source GBIF-based alert system for occurrences" - Nicolas Noé, Peter Desmet, Tim Adriaens, Bram D’Hondt, Lien Reyserhove & Damiano Oldoni (Belgium)

Second Prize winner:

- "Frictionless Data from Bionomia" - David Shorthouse (Canada)

Joint Third Prize winners:

- "Library of Identification Resources" - Lars Willighagen (Netherlands)
- "Open Data Biodiversity Mapper" - Sam Wenaas Perrin, Philip Stanley Mostert & Ron Togunov (Norway)

Details are available via the GBIF website here.

=== 2024 ===
Challenge: "The Ebbe Nielsen Challenge is intentionally open-ended. Entrants have a wide remit to create and improve tools and techniques that advance in open science and improve the access, quality and usefulness of GBIF-mediated data. Challenge submissions may be new applications, visualization methods, workflows or analyses, or they build on and extend existing tools and features. It is expected that successful entries provide practical, pragmatic solutions for the GBIF network while advancing biodiversity informatics and biodiversity data management, particularly in alignment with the GBIF strategic framework."

First Prize winner:

- "ChatIPT" - Rukaya Johaadien (Norway)

Second Prize winner:

- "Planetary Knowledge Base" - Qianqian (Hiris) Gu, Ben Scott & Vince Smith (United Kingdom)

Third Prize winner:

- "CoreTech Assistant" - Chen Yao

Details are available via the GBIF website here.

=== 2025 ===
Challenge: "The Ebbe Nielsen Challenge is intentionally open-ended. Entrants have a wide remit to create and improve tools and techniques that advance open science and improve the access, quality and usefulness of GBIF-mediated data. Challenge submissions may be new applications, visualization methods, workflows or analyses, or they build on and extend existing tools and features."

Joint First Prize winners:

- "BDQEmail" - Rukaya Johaadien (Norway)
- "galaxias" - Dax Kellie, Amanda Buyan, Shandiya Balasubramaniam, and Martin Westgate (Australia)

Second Prize winner:

- "Biodiversity Around Me" - Amandine Sahl, Jacques Fize and Camille Monchicourt (France)

Details are available via the GBIF website here.
