= Euthelairini =

Scientific classification
- Kingdom: Animalia
- Phylum: Arthropoda
- Class: Insecta
- Order: Diptera
- Family: Tachinidae
- Subfamily: Exoristinae
- Tribe: Euthelairini

Tribe of flies

Euthelairini is a tribe of flies in the family Tachinidae.

== Genera ==
- Asilidotachina Townsend, 1931
- Cerotachina Arnaud, 1963
- Cryptocladocera Bezzi, 1923
- Euthelaira Townsend, 1912
- Hypohoughia Townsend, 1927
- Iteuthelaira Townsend, 1927
- Minthotachina Townsend, 1935
- Neomintho Brauer & von Bergenstamm, 1891
- Neominthoidea Thompson, 1968
- Pelecotheca Townsend, 1919
