= Minthotachina =

Scientific classification
- Kingdom: Animalia
- Phylum: Arthropoda
- Class: Insecta
- Order: Diptera
- Family: Tachinidae
- Subfamily: Exoristinae
- Tribe: Euthelairini
- Genus: Minthotachina; Townsend, 1935

Type species
- Minthotachina miscella Townsend, 1935

Genus of flies

Minthotachina is a genus of flies in the family Tachinidae.

== Species ==
- Minthotachina miscella Townsend, 1935

== Distribution ==
Trinidad and Tobago.
