= Hypohoughia =

Scientific classification
- Kingdom: Animalia
- Phylum: Arthropoda
- Class: Insecta
- Order: Diptera
- Family: Tachinidae
- Subfamily: Exoristinae
- Tribe: Euthelairini
- Genus: Hypohoughia; Townsend, 1927

Type species
- Hypohoughia reclinata Townsend, 1927

Genus of flies

Hypohoughia is a genus of flies in the family Tachinidae.

== Species ==
- Hypohoughia reclinata Townsend, 1927

== Distribution ==
Brazil.
