= Asilidotachina =

Scientific classification
- Kingdom: Animalia
- Phylum: Arthropoda
- Class: Insecta
- Order: Diptera
- Family: Tachinidae
- Subfamily: Exoristinae
- Tribe: Euthelairini
- Genus: Asilidotachina; Townsend, 1931

Type species
- Asilidotachina elongata Townsend, 1931

Genus of flies

Asilidotachina is a genus of flies in the family Tachinidae.

== Species ==
- Asilidotachina elongata Townsend, 1931

== Distribution ==
Peru.
