= James Jenkins Simpson =

British entomologist and marine biologist

- Born: November 24, 1881; Elgin, Moray, Scotland
- Died: November 10, 1936 (aged 54); Aegean Sea
- Occupations: Entomologist; Marine biologist
- Known for: Studying animal species in West Africa and Turkey

James Jenkins Simpson (24 November 1881 – 10 November 1936) was a British entomologist and marine biologist who worked in West Africa and Turkey.

== Background ==
Simpson was the son of a gardener from Elgin; he studied at Elgin West End School and Aberdeen Free Church Training College before graduating M.A. from Aberdeen University in 1904. He was a Carnegie Research Scholar and Fellow at Aberdeen. He joined the British Indian government to study pearl oyster fisheries in southern Burma in 1906 and then worked in East Africa with the Nyassa Company.

In 1909 an Entomological Research Committee was formed to study ticks of economic importance in Africa. Simpson and Sheffield Airey Neave were appointed travelling entomologists and he collected mosquitoes, Tabanids, bed-bugs, fleas, lice and ticks in Nigeria in 1910 followed by visits to the Gold Coast and Sierra Leone. In 1919 Simpson joined the National Museum of Wales as Keeper of Zoology and in 1926 became Curator of the Public Museums of Liverpool.

He then took up a position in Turkey to head the Department of Oceanography and Marine Biological Research. Travelling from Greece on the ship Kyrenia, he was found missing from his cabin, last seen on the morning of 10 November 1936 and presumed drowned.

== See also ==
- List of people who disappeared mysteriously at sea

== Publications ==
- Simpson J. J. and Brown R. (1910) Asteroidea of Portuguese East-Afrika. Proceedings of the Royal Society of Edinburgh 18:45–60.
- Thomson, J. Arthur; Simpson, J.J; Brown, R.N.Rudmose; Summers, S.L.M.; Crane, George; Ritchie, James (1911). Zoological Studies chiefly on Alcyonarians (Fifth Series). Aberdeen: University of Aberdeen.
- Simpson, J.J. (1911). "Entomological Research in British West Africa. I. Gambia". Bulletin of Entomological Research. 2 (3): 187–239. doi:10.1017/S0007485300001449.
- Simpson, J.J. (1912). "Entomological Research in British West Africa. II. Northern Nigeria". Bulletin of Entomological Research. 2 (4): 301–356. doi:10.1017/S0007485300001541. S2CID 246279881.
- Simpson, J.J. (1912). "Entomological Research in British West Africa. III.—Southern Nigeria". Bulletin of Entomological Research. 3 (2): 137–193. doi:10.1017/S0007485300001796.
- Simpson, J.J. (1913). "Entomological research in British West Africa. IV. Sierra Leone". Bulletin of Entomological Research. 4 (3): 151–190. doi:10.1017/S000748530004311X.
- Simpson, J.J. (1914). "Entomological Research in British West Africa. V.—Gold Coast". Bulletin of Entomological Research. 5 (1): 1–36. doi:10.1017/S0007485300034490.
- Simpson, J. J.(1926). Report on rats and their parasitic fleas. Report of the Medical Officer of Health, Cardiff (1925): 20–23.
