= Kayla C. King =

Academic biologist

Kayla C. King is Professor of Evolutionary Ecology at University of Oxford, specialising in how interactions between hosts and parasites show evolutionary change.

== Career ==
Kayla Christina King studied B. Sc. Zoology at University of British Columbia, Canada from 2000 to 2004 followed by a master's degree in Biology at Concordia University, graduating in 2006. She then commenced study for her doctorate at Indiana University Bloomingtonin the United States that was awarded in 2011. She then moved to University of Liverpool in the United Kingdom for 2 years, partly financed through a Royal Society Newton Fellowship, followed by moving in 2013 to the University of Oxford.

In 2019 she was appointed professor of evolutionary ecology at University of Oxford, UK. She is also a tutorial fellow at Christ Church college.

Her research into evolutionary biology makes use of host-parasite interactions between a wide range of microbial and eukaryotic parasites in both natural and laboratory situations. These have included systems that are relevant to diseases of humans such as malaria and dengue and may assist in their biological control. However, she has also worked with non-pathogenic systems such as the normal microbiome of snails. Her research applies theoretical models as well as laboratory methods including genomics to study the interactions.

== Publications ==
King is the author or co-author of over 40 scientific publications. These include:

- King, Kayla C; Hurst, Gregory DD; Lewis, Zen (2020) Let's emerge from the pandemic lockdown into a fairer academic world. Current Biology 30 R799
- King, Kayla C.; Brockhurst, Michael A.; Vasieva, Olga; Paterson, Steve; Betts, Alex; Ford, Suzanne A.; Frost, Crystal L.; Horsburgh, Malcolm J.; Haldenby, Sam; Hurst, Gregory D. D.(2016) Rapid evolution of microbe-mediated protection against pathogens in a worm host. ISME Journal 10 pages 1915-1924
- Brockhurst, Michael A.; Chapman, Tracey; King Kayla C.; Mank, Judith E.; Paterson, Steve; Hurst, Gregory D. D. (2014) Running with the Red Queen: the role of biotic conflicts in evolution. Proceedings of the Royal Society B - Biological Sciences 281 Article Number: 20141382
- Wolinska, Justyna; King, Kayla C. (2009) Environment can alter selection in host-parasite interactions. Trends in Parasitology 25 pages 236-244
