= World Polio Day =

World day; 24 October

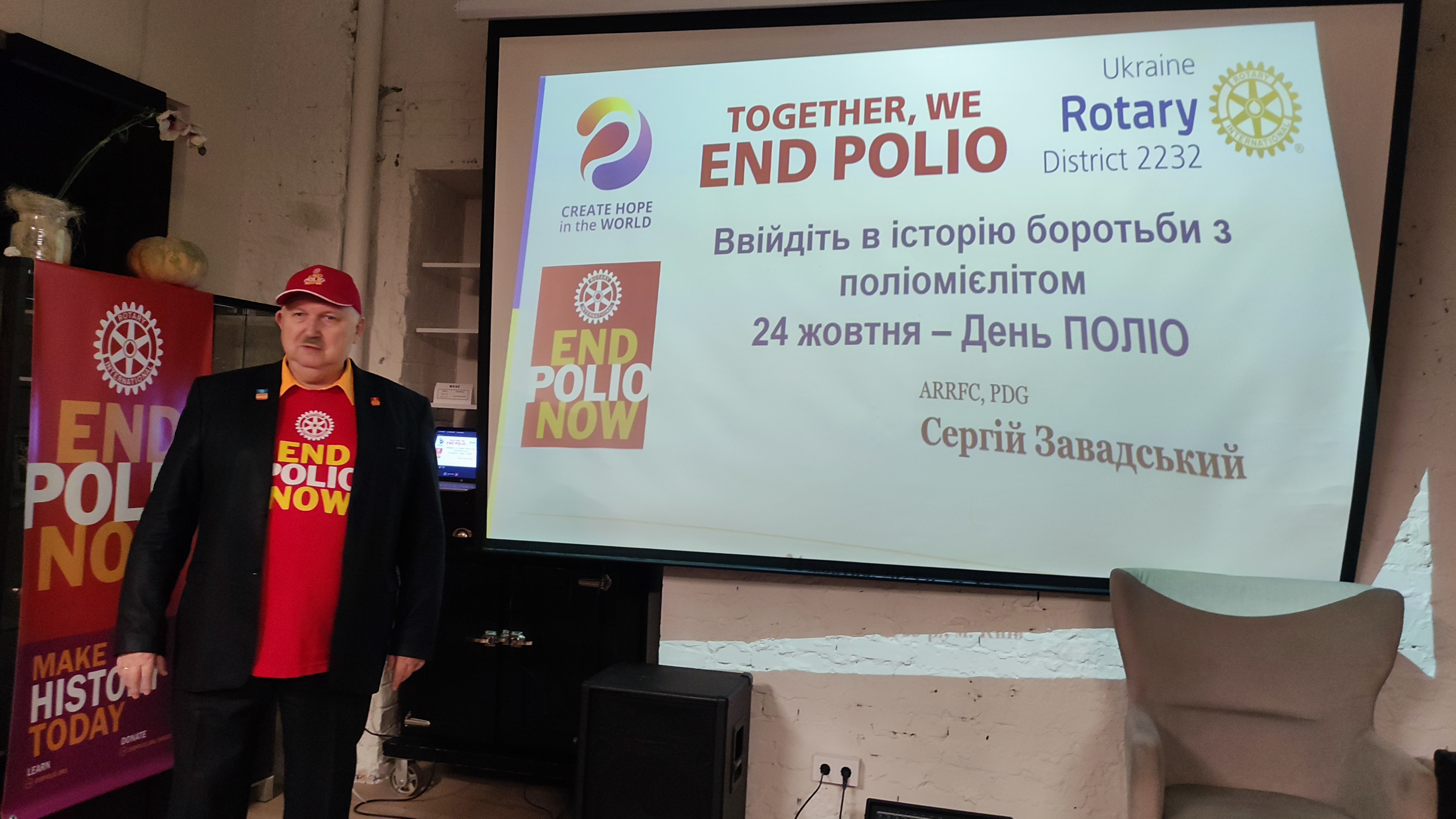
Celebration of the World Polio Day by Rotarians in Kyiv, Ukraine, October 2023

World Polio Day (24 October) was established by Rotary International to commemorate the birth of Jonas Salk, who led the first team to develop a vaccine against poliomyelitis. Use of this inactivated poliovirus vaccine and subsequent widespread use of the oral poliovirus vaccine developed by Albert Sabin led to establishment of the Global Polio Eradication Initiative (GPEI) in 1988. Since then, GPEI has reduced polio worldwide by 99 percent.

World Polio Day is an annual observance when members of Rotary International, along with public health advocates and individuals committed to a polio-free world, convene to commemorate their accomplishments in the global campaign against polio. This day also provides a platform for deliberation on the requisite measures to permanently eliminate polio from the face of the Earth.
