= Sheffield Airey Neave =

British naturalist and entomologist (1879–1961)

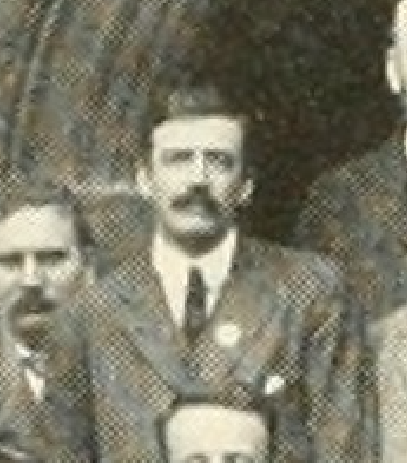
- Born: 20 April 1879; Kensworth, Hertfordshire
- Died: 31 December 1961 (aged 82); Chelmsford, Essex
- Occupations: Naturalist and entomologist
- Spouses: Dorothy Middleton; Mary Hodges
- Children: 5, including Airey

Sheffield Airey Neave CMG OBE (20 April 1879 – 31 December 1961) was a British naturalist and entomologist. Neave was the grandson of Sheffield Neave, a governor of the Bank of England and he was the father of Airey Neave.

== Early life ==
Born in Kensworth in Hertfordshire on 20 April 1879, he was the son of Sheffield Henry M. Neave and his wife Gertrude Charlotte Margaret (née Airey). He was educated at Eton and Magdalen College, Oxford.

== Africa ==
Neave's first work was research into the problems related to the tsetse fly and the study of African animal life. He was part of the Geodetic Survey of Northern Rhodesia between 1904 and 1905. Between 1906 and 1908 he was part of the Katanga Sleeping Sickness Commission and then from 1909 to 1913 the Entomological Research Committee of Tropical Africa. While he collected in Eastern Africa, fellow collector James Jenkins Simpson collected from West Africa.

== Entomologist and name compilation activities ==
Neave returned to the United Kingdom in 1913 and was appointed assistant director of the Imperial Institute of Entomology, becoming director from 1942 to 1946. He was rewarded for his contribution to entomology with an appointment as an officer of the Order of the British Empire in 1933 and a companion of the Order of St. Michael and St. George in 1941. From 1918 until 1933 he was honorary secretary of the Royal Entomological Society and was its president in 1934–35.

In 1934 he had the idea to compile an updated index of all published generic and subgeneric names in zoology, an activity which occupied the period 1935–1939 and resulted in the publication of his (initially) four-volume Nomenclator Zoologicus in 1939–1940. He also oversaw the preparation of a fifth volume, published in 1950, and with the work of others, the work eventually ran to 9 print volumes (covering names published between 1753 and 1994) plus an additional tenth, electronic-only compilation, completed by Thomson Reuters in 2004. The entire work was subsequently digitised by the uBio project in the US and made available for web-based query in 2004–2005.

== Retirement ==
Neave retired in 1946 to garden and farm in Essex but he carried on as honorary secretary of the Zoological Society of London until 1952. It was a position he had held since 1942.

== Family life ==
Neave married twice, firstly to Dorothy Middleton and they had two sons and three daughters, the eldest is Airey Neave later a Member of Parliament. Dorothy died in 1942 and Neave married secondly to Mary Hodges in 1946 in London.

Professional and academic associations
Preceded by Julian Huxley	Secretary of the Zoological Society of London; 1942–1952	Succeeded by Viscount Chaplin
