= Chris Humphries =

British botanist (1947-2009)

- Chris Humphries c. 2003
- Born: 29 April 1947; Derby, England, United Kingdom
- Died: 31 July 2009 (aged 62)
- Awards: Bicentenary Medal (1980); Linnean Medal (2001)
- Scientific career
- Fields: Botany
- Workplaces: Natural History Museum, London

Christopher J. Humphries FLS (Derby, 29 April 1947 – 31 July 2009) was a British botanist known for his work on systematic botany and biogeography.

In 1980, he was awarded the Bicentenary Medal of the Linnean Society. In 2001 the Linnean Society of London awarded him the Linnean Medal for his contributions to the botany.

The standard author abbreviation Humphries is used to indicate this person as the author when citing a botanical name.

== Bibliography ==
Publications included:

- Diment, Judith A.; Humphries, Christopher J.; Newington, Linda; Shaughnessy, Elaine (1984). "Catalogue of the Natural History drawings commissioned by Joseph Banks on the Endeavour Voyage 1768–1771 held in the British Museum (Natural History) : Part 1: Botany: Australia". Bulletin of the British Museum (Natural History). Historical Series. 11 (Complete). London: British Museum (Natural History): 1–183. doi:10.5962/p.310430.
- Diment, Judith A.; Humphries, Christopher J.; Newington, Linda; Shaughnessy, Elaine; Press, J. R. (1987). "Catalogue of the Natural History drawings commissioned by Joseph Banks on the Endeavour Voyage 1768–1771 held in the British Museum (Natural History) : Part 2: Botony [sic] : Brazil, Java, Madeira, New Zealand, Society Islands and Tierra del Fuego". Bulletin of the British Museum (Natural History). Historical Series. 12 (Complete). London: British Museum (Natural History): 1–200. doi:10.5962/p.310431.
