= Roger Blackman (cricketer) =

Barbadian cricketer

Personal information
- Full name: Roger George Blackman
- Born: 4 April 1915; Saint Joseph, Barbados
- Died: unknown
- Batting: Right-handed
- Role: Batsman
- Source: Cricinfo, 11 November 2020

Roger George Blackman (born 4 April 1915, date of death unknown) was a Barbadian cricketer. He played in four first-class matches for Barbados in 1940/41, and 1941/42, all of them against Trinidad. In his second match, in February 1941, he scored 69 and 140.
