= Doris Bachtrog =

Austrian-born evolutionary geneticist

Doris Bachtrog is an Austrian-born evolutionary geneticist and professor in the Department of Integrative Biology at the University of California, Berkeley. Her research focuses on the evolution of sex chromosomes, including dosage compensation of X-linked genes and degeneration of Y chromosomes, using comparative and functional genomics approaches in Drosophila and other taxa. She was elected a fellow of the American Academy of Arts and Sciences in 2024.

== Education and career ==
Bachtrog received an M.Sc. (1999) and a Ph.D. (2002) from the University of Vienna. From 2002 until 2003 she was a postdoctoral fellow with the European Molecular Biology Organization followed by a position as a fellow at Cornell University that she held until 2005 when she moved to the University of California, San Diego as an assistant professor. In 2008 she moved to the University of California, Berkeley where she was promoted to associate professor in 2012.

== Research ==
Bachtrog's group investigates how recombination, selection, and chromatin dynamics shape sex chromosome evolution and the genetic basis of adaptation and speciation. Representative papers include her review on Y-chromosome degeneration in Nature Reviews Genetics (2013), work on accelerated adaptive evolution on a newly formed X chromosome in Drosophila (2009), and a 2014 perspective paper on the diversity of sex-determination systems (2014). More recent work addresses epigenetic conflict and mutational burdens on degenerating Y chromosomes.

== Awards and honours ==
- Packard Fellow in Science and Engineering (2008).
- Elected fellow of the American Academy of Arts and Sciences (Class of 2024).

== Selected publications ==
- Bachtrog, Doris (2013). "Y chromosome evolution: emerging insights into processes of Y degeneration". Nature Reviews Genetics. 14 (2): 113–124. doi:10.1038/nrg3366. PMC 4120474. PMID 23329112.
- Bachtrog, Doris; Jensen, Jeffrey D.; Zhang, Zhi (2009). "Accelerated Adaptive Evolution on a Newly Formed X Chromosome". PLOS Biology. 7 (4) e1000082. doi:10.1371/journal.pbio.1000082. PMC 2672600. PMID 19402745.
- Bachtrog, Doris; Mank, Judith E.; Peichel, Christianne L.; Otto, Sarah P.; Kirkpatrick, Mark; Ashman, Tia-Lynn; Hahn, Matthew W.; Kitano, Jun; Mayrose, Itay; Ming, Ray; Perrin, Nicolas; Ross, Laura; Valenzuela, Nicole; Vamosi, Jana C. (2014). "Sex determination: why so many ways of doing it?". PLOS Biology. 12 (7) e1001899. doi:10.1371/journal.pbio.1001899. PMC 4077654. PMID 24983465.
- Wei, Kevin H.-C.; Riddle, Nicole C.; Birchler, James A.; Bachtrog, Doris (2020). "Epigenetic conflict on a degenerating Y chromosome increases mutational burden in Drosophila males". Nature Communications. 11 (1) 5537. Bibcode:2020NatCo..11.5537W. doi:10.1038/s41467-020-19134-9. PMC 7608633. PMID 33139741.
