= Judith Mank =

American zoologist

Judith Elizabeth Mank
- Born: 1976 (age 49–50); Houston
- Education: University of Georgia; University of Florida; Pennsylvania State University
- Scientific career
- Workplaces: University of Oxford; University College London; University of British Columbia
- Thesis: The evolution of reproductive and genomic diversity in ray-finned fishes (2006)

Judith Elizabeth Mank is an American-British-Canadian zoologist who is a Canada 150 Chair at the University of British Columbia. She studies how evolution produces variation in animals. She is known for her studies of sex chromosomes and the genetic basis of sexual dimorphism. Her research has focused on various animals to study how sexual selection influences gene expression and genomic architecture.

== Early life and education ==
Mank studied anthropology at the University of Florida. She moved to Pennsylvania State University for graduate studies, joining the School of Forest Resources. After completing her master's degree she moved to the University of Georgia for doctoral research with John Avise. Her research focused on reproductive diversity in fish.

== Research and career ==
Following her postdoctoral work at Uppsala University, Mank was a lecturer at the University of Oxford from 2008-2012, and then professor at University College London from 2012-2018. She joined the faculty at the University of British Columbia in 2018 as a professor and Canada 150 Chair in Evolutionary Genomics. Her research includes the evolution of sex chromosomes and the genetics underlying sex differences. Her work has revealed fundamental properties of the earliest stages of Y chromosomes formation. Mank makes use of genomic data to understand how ecological factors, such as sexual selection, effect genome evolution, and how sex differences are encoded within the genome. She has studied the genetics of female mate preference in guppies, and how this affects the diversity and genetics of pigmentation in males.

== Awards and honors ==
- 2008 American Society of Naturalists Young Investigator Award
- 2009 Society for the Study of Evolution Dobzhansky Prize
- 2013 Berlin Institute for Advanced Study Fellow
- 2013 Zoological Society of London Scientific Medal
- 2016 Royal Society Wolfson Fellowship
- 2020 Uppsala University Honorary Doctorate

== Selected publications ==
- Doris Bachtrog; Judith E Mank; Catherine L Peichel; et al. (July 2014). "Sex determination: why so many ways of doing it?". PLOS Biology. 12 (7) e1001899. doi:10.1371/journal.pbio.1001899. ISSN 1544-9173. PMC 4077654. PMID 24983465. Wikidata Q21092698.
- Doris Bachtrog; Mark Kirkpatrick; Judith E. Mank; Stuart F McDaniel; J Chris Pires; William Rice; Nicole Valenzuela (1 September 2011). "Are all sex chromosomes created equal?". Trends in Genetics. 27 (9): 350–357. doi:10.1016/j.tig.2011.05.005. ISSN 0168-9525. PMID 21962970. Wikidata Q37941230.
- Judith E. Mank; DANIEL E. L. PROMISLOW; JOHN C. AVISE (17 January 2006). "Evolution of alternative sex-determining mechanisms in teleost fishes". Biological Journal of the Linnean Society. 87 (1): 83–93. doi:10.1111/j.1095-8312.2006.00558.x. ISSN 0024-4066. Wikidata Q56083536.
