= Ebbe Nielsen Prize =

Danish award for biodiversity informatics

The Ebbe Nielsen Prize was an international science award made annually between 2002 and 2014 by the Global Biodiversity Information Facility (GBIF), to recognize a researcher who had made substantial contributions to the field of biodiversity informatics. The prize was established in memory of prominent entomologist and biodiversity informatics proponent Ebbe Nielsen, who died of a heart attack in the U.S.A. en route to the 2001 GBIF Governing Board meeting.

== History ==
The award was created in 2001 to honour the recently deceased Danish-Australian entomologist Ebbe Nielsen, who was a keen proponent of both GBIF and the biodiversity informatics discipline. At the time of its creation, the prize was the only global award for work in biodiversity. Initially set at US$35,000 and later €30,000, the award comprised a cash prize plus an invitation to give a guest lecture to address the annual meeting of the governing body of GBIF in whichever country the meeting was being held for that year. In its 2003 call for submissions, the prize was stated as being "[awarded] annually, to a promising researcher, normally within ten years of their entering the research field of biodiversity informatics. Candidates should be combining biodiversity informatics and biosystematic research in novel and exciting ways ... The primary selection criterion is scientific excellence as evidenced by the nominee’s research and publication record, and in particular, the innovation shown in combining biosystematics and biodiversity informatics research in their field of activity." Over the life of the prize, it was won by researchers from Japan, Germany, Sweden, Argentina, United States (twice), Australia (twice), United Kingdom, Colombia, Canada, Denmark and Portugal.

In 2015, GBIF revamped the award as an incentive competition, now known as the Ebbe Nielsen Challenge.

== List of recipients from 2002–2014 ==
The following list of recipients is given on the GBIF web site:

- 2002: Nozomi Ytow (Japan)
- 2003: Stefan Schröder (Germany)
- 2004: Johan Nilsson (Sweden)
- 2005: Pablo Goloboff (Argentina)
- 2006: John Wieczorek (United States)
- 2007: Paul Flemons (Australia)
- 2008: Vince Stuart Smith (United Kingdom)
- 2009: Andy Jarvis (Colombia)
- 2010: Sujeevan Ratnasingham (Canada)
- 2011: Jens-Christian Svenning (Denmark)
- 2012: Nathan Swenson (United States)
- 2013: Miguel Bastos Araújo (Portugal)
- 2014: Tony Rees (Australia)
