= Boreal Forest Conservation Framework =

Plan to protect the Canadian boreal forest

The Boreal Forest Conservation Framework, was adopted December 1, 2003 to protect the Canadian boreal forest. The vision set out in the Framework is "to sustain the ecological and cultural integrity of the Canadian boreal region, in perpetuity." Its goal is to conserve the boreal region by: "protecting at least 50% of the region in a network of large interconnected protected areas, and supporting sustainable communities through world-leading ecosystem-based resource management practices and leading edge stewardship practices in the remaining landscape."

== Purpose of framework ==
Canada's boreal biome comprises forest, wetlands, mountains, rivers and lakes. It is still largely intact ecologically; along with the Amazon rainforest and Siberian Taiga, it is one of the Earth's largest remaining intact wilderness regions. Abundant wildlife, including some of the world's largest populations of caribou, bears, wolves and lynx are present here. It provides the summer range for one third of North America's songbirds and three fourths of its waterfowl.

The Boreal Forest Conservation Framework promotes conservation of the entire boreal region. This is critical to achieving the sustainability and well-being of communities that rely on it, and preserve its ecological values. If the framework is acted upon, it will position Canada as a world leader in forest and wetlands conservation and management.

The Framework supports the spirit of a 1999 report of the Senate of Canada that recommended the following goals:

- a long-range goal for the boreal of 20% in strict protected areas,
- 60% in conservation areas where maintaining ecological values was the primary goal, and
- 20% in intensive development.

The Framework simplifies the Senate recommendation by redistributing the 60% identified for conservation equally between the protected areas other conservation areas. This allows for greater flexibility in decision-making with respect to protected areas. It also recognizes that to become truly sustainable, better land use practices will be needed in the connective lands and waters of the boreal between protected areas.

== The need for conservation planning ==
This approach to large-scale conservation planning is supported by recent research in conservation biology and landscape ecology. Avoiding the effects of habitat fragmentation on wildlife populations requires conservation of at least 30-50% of original habitat. However, maintaining all ecological functions, natural services and cultural values will likely require conservation of significantly more than 50% of a landscape. This highlights the importance of protection and careful management of the remaining lands and waters. Moreover, given the importance of large-scale natural disturbances (such as fires) to ecosystem function of the boreal forest, planning must occur over very large areas.
