= Global Biodiversity Information Facility =

Aggregator of scientific data on biodiversity

- Website type: Biodiversity, natural history
- Area served: Worldwide
- Website: www.gbif.org
- Commercial: No
- Launched: 2001; 25 years ago
- Current status: Active

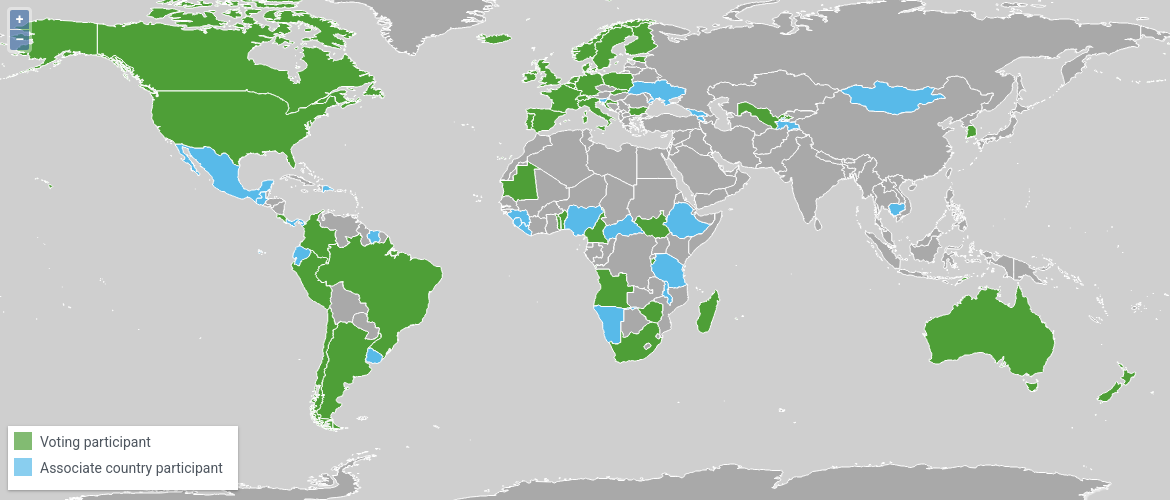
GBIF's 'Participants' are nations and organizations that collaborate to advance free and open access to biodiversity data. Map: Participant nations, 2025.

The Global Biodiversity Information Facility (GBIF) is an international organisation that focuses on making scientific data on biodiversity available via the Internet using web services. The data are provided by many institutions from around the world; GBIF's information architecture makes these data accessible and searchable through a single portal. Data available through the GBIF portal are primarily distribution data on plants, animals, fungi, and microbes for the world, and scientific names data.

The mission of the GBIF is to facilitate free and open access to biodiversity data worldwide to underpin sustainable development. Priorities—with an emphasis on promoting participation and working through partners—include mobilising biodiversity data, developing protocols and standards to ensure scientific integrity and interoperability, building an informatics architecture to allow the interlinking of diverse data types from disparate sources, promoting capacity building and catalysing development of analytical tools for improved decision-making.

GBIF strives to form informatics linkages among digital data resources from across the spectrum of biological organisation, from genes to ecosystems, and to connect these to issues important to science, society and sustainability by using georeferencing and GIS tools. It works in partnership with other international organisations such as the Catalogue of Life partnership, Biodiversity Information Standards, the Consortium for the Barcode of Life (CBOL), the Encyclopedia of Life (EOL), and GEOSS. The biodiversity data available through the GBIF has increased by more than 1,150% in the past decade, partially due to the participation of citizen scientists.

From 2002 to 2014, GBIF awarded a prestigious annual global award in the area of biodiversity informatics, the Ebbe Nielsen Prize, valued at €30,000. As of 2018, the GBIF Secretariat presents two annual prizes: the GBIF Ebbe Nielsen Challenge and the Young Researchers Award.

== See also ==
- ABCD Schema
- Atlas of Living Australia (ALA)
- Australasian Virtual Herbarium (AVH)
- Darwin Core
- Global biodiversity
- List of electronic Floras (for other online flora databases)
