= Roderic D. M. Page =

New Zealand-born evolutionary biologist

Rod Page
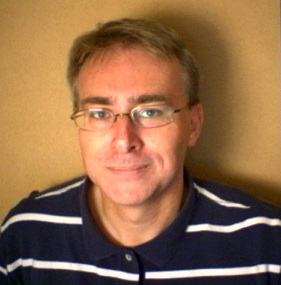
- Rod Page
- Born: Roderic Dugald Morton Page; 1962 (age 63–64); Auckland, New Zealand
- Citizenship: New Zealand
- Education: University of Auckland (PhD)
- Known for: Molecular evolution : a phylogenetic approach
- Awards: Bicentenary Medal of the Linnean Society 1998
- Scientific career
- Fields: Biodiversity informatics; Phyloinformatics
- Workplaces: University of Glasgow; University of Oxford; University of Auckland; Natural History Museum
- Thesis: Panbiogeography: a cladistic approach (1990)
- Doctoral advisor: Brian McArdle
- Doctoral students: Vincent Smith
- Page's voice recorded December 2015
- Website: iphylo.blogspot.co.uk; taxonomy.zoology.gla.ac.uk/rod/rod.html

Roderic Dugald Morton Page (born 1962) is a New Zealand-born evolutionary biologist at the University of Glasgow, Scotland, and the author of several books. As of 2015 he is professor at the University of Glasgow and was editor of the journal Systematic Biology until the end of 2007. His main interests are in phylogenetics, evolutionary biology and bioinformatics.

== Education ==
Page was born in Auckland and earned a PhD in 1990 from the University of Auckland.

== Career and research ==
Page is known for his work on co-speciation and in particular the development of bioinformatic software such as TreeMap, RadCon, and TreeView. Page is a co-author with Eddie Holmes of Molecular Evolution: A phylogenetic approach and editor of Tangled trees: phylogeny, cospeciation and coevolution.

=== Awards and honours ===
He received the Bicentenary Medal of the Linnean Society in 1998, and the Ebbe Nielsen Challenge joint first prize in 2018.
