= Roger L. Blackman =

British entomologist

Roger Laurence Blackman (24 July 1941 – 17 March 2022) was a British entomologist and former President of the Royal Entomological Society (1999–2000). He is particularly known for work on the evolutionary biology and ecology of Hemiptera.
