= Scott Taylor (biologist) =

Associate Professor and Biologist

Scott A. Taylor is an associate professor at the University of Colorado, where he teaches topics such as hybridization, speciation, evolutionary ecology, and population genomics within different species of birds. Taylor serves as a member of their Department of Ecology and Evolutionary Biology. Prior to achieving this position, his Ph.D. at Queen’s University in Kingston, Ontario, Canada consisted of applying genomics to natural hybrid zones to study the architecture of reproductive isolation.

== Life and academic career ==
Taylor was raised in southern Ontario. Taylor received his undergraduate degree in wildlife biology at the University of Guelph, later pursuing a graduate degree at Queen's University.

Taylor’s research studies reproductive isolation as it pertains to speciation, and the subsequent traits that contribute to the speciation process. Such data is relevant to climate change, evolution, and varying species distributions. His 2019 speech at the Story Collider Event at Evolution highlights the parallels between coming out as gay not only as an adult but also as a scientist. Traditionally, the LGBTQ+ community has been under-represented within the scientific community, and as such, Taylor serves as an exemplar of the addition of EDI within evolutionary biology.

== Publications and contributions ==
In addition to speaking at the 2019 Story Collider Event, Taylor was also a recipient of the Young Investigator prize under the American Ornithological Society. He has a range of 51 publications, across the span of 2008 to 2021.

His most cited publications are:

- D Toews, SA Taylor, R Vallender, A Brelsford, B Butcher, P Messer, Irby Lovette Plumage Genes and Little Else Distinguish the Genomes of Hybridizing Warblers Current Biology 26 (17), 2313–2318 (Cited 278 times, according to Google Scholar)
- SA Taylor, EL Larson Insights from genomes into the evolutionary importance and prevalence of hybridization in nature (Nature ecology & evolution 3 (2), 170-177 Cited 175 times, according to Google Scholar.)
- S Taylor, E Larson, R Harrison Hybrid zones: windows on climate change Trends in Ecology and Evolution (Cited 160 times, according to Google Scholar.)
- SA Taylor, TA White, WM Hochachka, V Ferretti, RL Curry, I Lovette Climate-mediated movement of an avian hybrid zone Current Biology 24 (6), 671-676 (Cited 156 times, according to Google Scholar.)
