= Bulletin of the Natural History Museum =

Series of UK scientific journals

Bulletin of the Natural History Museum, formerly known as Bulletin of the British Museum (Natural History) was a series of scientific journals published by the British Museum, and later by the Natural History Museum of London. Titles in the series included

- Bulletin of the British Museum (Natural History), Botany Series
- Bulletin of the British Museum (Natural History), Entomology Series
- Bulletin of the British Museum (Natural History), Geology Series
- Bulletin of the British Museum (Natural History), Historical Series
- Bulletin of the British Museum (Natural History), Mineralogy Series
- Bulletin of the British Museum (Natural History), Zoology Series

Upon transfer to the Natural History Museum, the journals were known as

- Bulletin of the Natural History Museum, Botany Series
- Bulletin of the Natural History Museum, Entomology Series
- Bulletin of the Natural History Museum, Historical Series
- Bulletin of the Natural History Museum, Geology Series (which included the former Mineralogy series)
- Bulletin of the Natural History Museum, Zoology Series

The Botany, Entomology and Zoology series merged to form Systematics and Biodiversity, while the Geology series was succeeded by the Journal of Systematic Palaeontology.
