= Tony Rees (scientist) =

British scientist

Dr Anthony J.J. "Tony" Rees
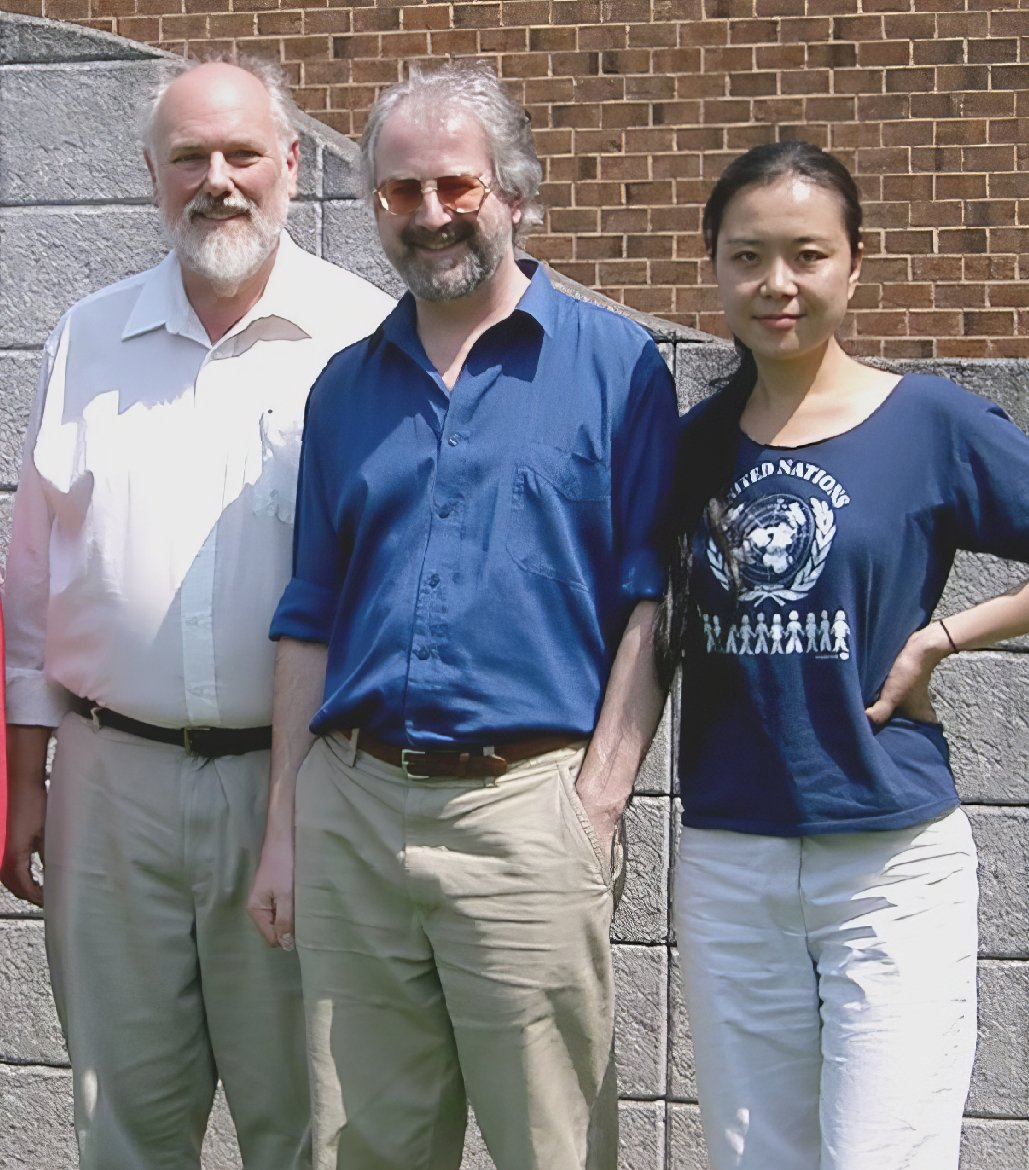
- Tony Rees (centre) with members of the Ocean Biogeographic Information System (OBIS) team pictured at Rutgers University, 2004: Fred Grassle (left), Phoebe Zhang (right)
- Born: 1953 (age 72–73)
- Known for: Marine biology, Biodiversity informatics, software development
- Parents: Henry Rees (father); Freda Rees (mother)
- Awards: Ebbe Nielsen Prize (2014)
- Scientific career
- Fields: Biology, Marine Biology, Biodiversity Informatics
- Institutions: University College London, CSIRO Division of Fisheries (later CSIRO Marine and Atmospheric Research
- Thesis: (1979)
- Doctoral advisor: Gordon F. Leedale
- Author abbrev. (botany): A.J.J.Rees
- Website: www.researchgate.net/profile/Tony-Rees

Anthony J. J. ("Tony") Rees (born 1953) is a British-born software developer, data manager and biologist resident in Australia since 1986, and previously a data manager with CSIRO Marine and Atmospheric Research. He is responsible for developing a number of software systems currently used in science data management and biodiversity informatics, including c-squares, Taxamatch, and IRMNG, the Interim Register of Marine and Nonmarine Genera. He has also been closely involved with the development of other biodiversity informatics initiatives including the Ocean Biogeographic Information System (OBIS), AquaMaps, and the iPlant Taxonomic Name Resolution Service (TNRS). Prior to his involvement in data management, he worked as a light and electron microscopist studying freshwater and marine phytoplankton, and microfossils.

== Biography ==
Rees was born in the UK and studied for a degree in plant sciences at the University of Leeds from 1971 to 1974, publishing one paper on the description of a new chrysophyte alga from his undergraduate work. Subsequently, he obtained a Ph.D. from the same university, with a thesis entitled "The phytoplankton of a eutrophic lake: community dynamics and ultrastructural studies". In the 1980s he worked for the Micropalaeontology Unit of the Geology Department at University College London before migrating to Australia where he managed the electron microscope facility for the CSIRO Division of Fisheries Research until that facility's closure in 1996, whereupon he transitioned into the area of marine data management for the same science agency. In that position he combined oceanographic and marine biological data management and developed an interest in the emerging field of biodiversity informatics, also including a role assisting the technical development of the Ocean Biogeographic Information System (OBIS) being developed by J. Frederick Grassle in the U.S.A. From 2009 to 2014 he managed the Australian node of OBIS, located at CSIRO, and also collaborated with other national and international biodiversity informatics and data sharing initiatives including the Encyclopedia of Life, the Global Biodiversity Information Facility, the Atlas of Living Australia, the Open Tree of Life project, FishBase, and others. Rees left CSIRO in 2014, since when his Interim Register of Marine and Nonmarine Genera project has been hosted on data infrastructure at the Flanders Marine Institute (VLIZ) in Belgium, with which he continues an involvement as at 2026.

== Development of data management tools ==
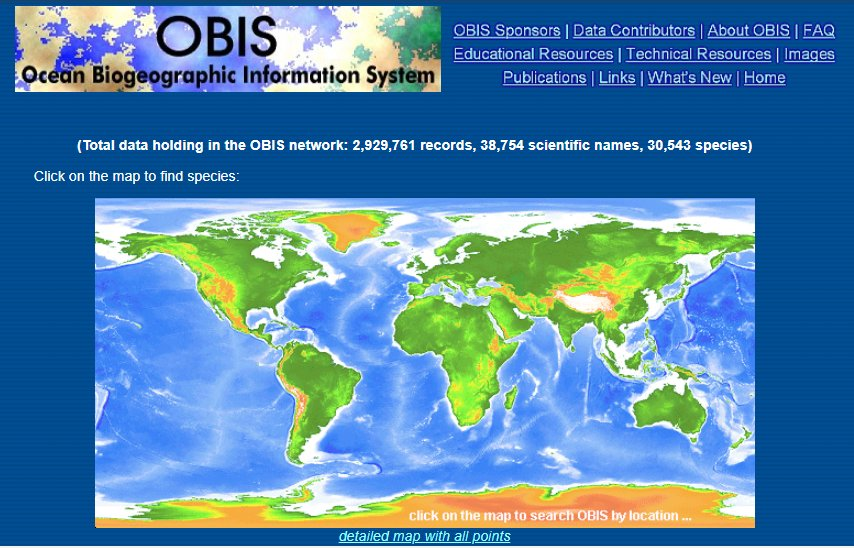
June 2004 version of the OBIS front page (www.iobis.org) incorporating "click on a map" spatial search based on c-squares representations of data distributions in the OBIS Index, designed by Rees and implemented by Rees and Y. Zhang

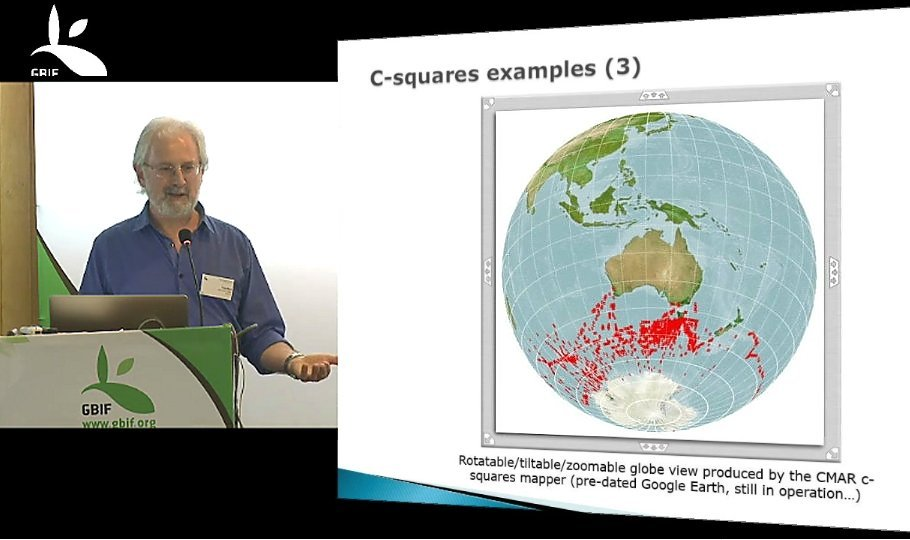
Rees speaking at the 2014 GBIF Science Symposium, New Delhi, India; behind him a slide illustrating the "globe view" capability of the c-squares mapper, as implemented for data from the Ocean Biodiversity Information System

In 2002 Rees devised a grid-based identification system "c-squares" for units of geographic space to which areas of scientific operation by particular research projects in his agency could be allocated; by designing the system to cover any scale from global to local, c-squares was also a good fit for the initial spatial data handling of both the OBIS and the subsequent AquaMaps projects, in addition to its original implementation within CSIRO Fisheries' "MarLIN" metadata system. A 2006 upgrade of the "c-squares mapper" software to produce rotatable and zoomable "globe views" was an early, browser-based, implementation of a virtual globe, pre-dating the eventual availability of the (far better specified) Google Earth software as a user-addressable web application.

In 2003–2004, Rees was responsible for a redesign of the OBIS search and display software utilising both c-squares for rapid spatial search and mapping of the resulting marine species distribution information, and pre-indexing of all distributed content at a central data hub so that reliance on live, distributed queries to remote, federated data suppliers was removed; this redesign went live in the production version of OBIS in 2004. At the same time, he introduced a "backbone taxonomy" for OBIS data holdings based on the then-latest (2003) edition of the Catalogue of Life, with individual names flagged as either marine or nonmarine, since OBIS wished to expose only the marine element of content supplied by external systems which did not always discriminate between records on the basis of habitat.

Aware of taxonomic gaps in this last effort arising from incompleteness in the then Catalogue of Life, in 2006 Rees commenced a new taxonomic data compilation entitled the "Interim Register of Marine and Nonmarine Genera" (IRMNG) which attempted to list all published genera of the world and assign them either a marine, or nonmarine status (later this simple distinction was further broken down into marine/brackish/freshwater and terrestrial states), also an extant/fossil flag for the use of systems that wished in addition to discriminate between extant and fossil taxa. IRMNG, initially conceived as a short term data compilation project, turned out to be more complex to complete than initially envisaged and continues to the present time under the auspices first of CSIRO in Australia, then (2016 onwards) hosted at the Flanders Marine Institute (Dutch: Vlaams Instituut voor de Zee, VLIZ) in Belgium.

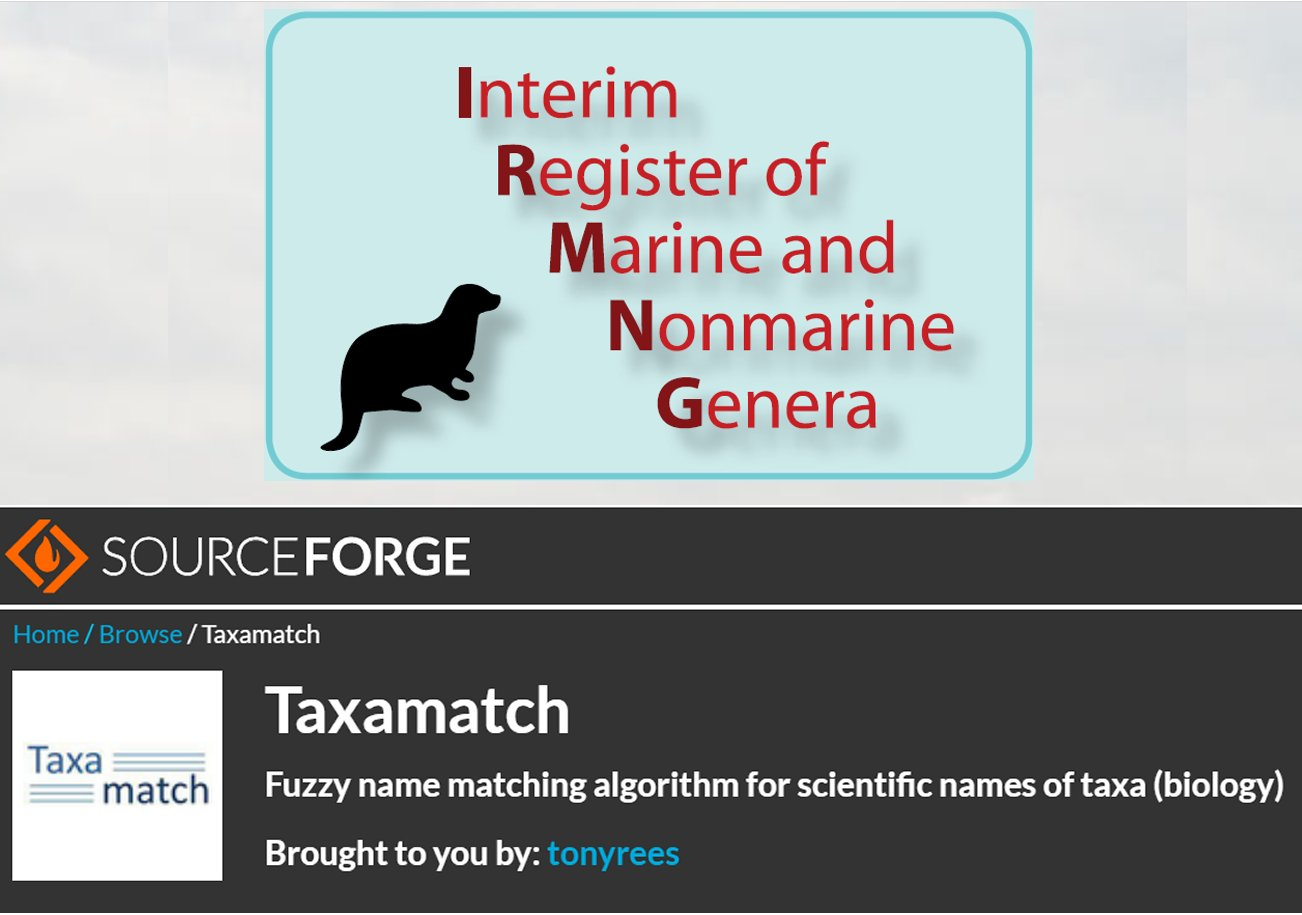
IRMNG and Taxamatch, two biodiversity informatics applications developed by Rees in the 2000s-2010s

An additional software tool developed by Rees is a method for spell checking scientific names of organisms entitled "Taxamatch" that aims for high recall (no candidate correctly spelled names missed) and also good precision (rejection of "false hits"), when an input (potentially misspelled) name is supplied and a list of correctly spelled names is available against which it can be tested. This method has subsequently been adopted as a useful feature in a number of global taxonomic databases including the iPlant Taxonomic Name Resolution Service for plants, the World Register of Marine Species (WoRMS) and its dozens of component individual databases, the Euro+Med PlantBase and the EU-NOMEN portal to the Pan-European Species directories Infrastructure (PESI) in addition to its incorporation into IRMNG.

For his work in the area of biodiversity informatics including that on c-squares, OBIS, IRMNG and Taxamatch, the Global Biodiversity Information Facility (GBIF) awarded Rees the 2014 Ebbe Nielsen Prize. Part of the accompanying 2014 citation from GBIF reads:

Ward Appeltans, OBIS manager at UNESCO's Intergovernmental Oceanographic Commission, said he was glad Rees' life work, dedication and perseverance were rewarded by this prestigious prize. "Tony Rees has successfully combined two of his passions, informatics and biology, and with the right intuition and knowledge he has built solutions that have been used by thousands of scientists all over the world."

For a period in the 2010s, Rees was a member of the Global Team of the Catalogue of Life, taking part in discussions regarding that projects's ongoing functionality and evolution. He is currently (2021) a member of the Catalogue of Life Taxonomy Group. He was also a member of the international teams responsible for designing and implementing the biodiversity-related AquaMaps (global predictive maps for aquatic organisms) and iPlant TNRS (Taxonomic Name Resolution Service) projects, described in the scientific literature in 2010 and 2013, respectively. Five-degree global "c-squares" cells were also used as the fundamental reporting and analysis units for the first standardized data analysis and mapping of global marine biogeographic realms by M. Costello et al. in 2017. In 2020, data from IRMNG were used to release as a data table, and provide summary statistics on, all of the known genera of the world and their synonyms, as held in IRMNG at that time. Meanwhile, the International Council for the Exploration of the Sea (ICES) have most recently been using c-squares as the underlying spatial grid for managing all of their vessel monitoring systems (VMS) and fishing logbook data, and have also built several applications around this including "FishFrame" (refer C-squares article for more information), and the EU-funded Horizon 2020 ATLAS Project which studied vulnerable marine ecosystems (VMEs) in the North-East Atlantic also adopted c-squares as the underlying spatial grid for its main data structure, the VME Index.

== See also ==
- C-squares
- Ocean Biogeographic Information System
- Interim Register of Marine and Nonmarine Genera
- CSIRO Marine and Atmospheric Research
