= RV Zeeleeuw =

Research ship built in 1977

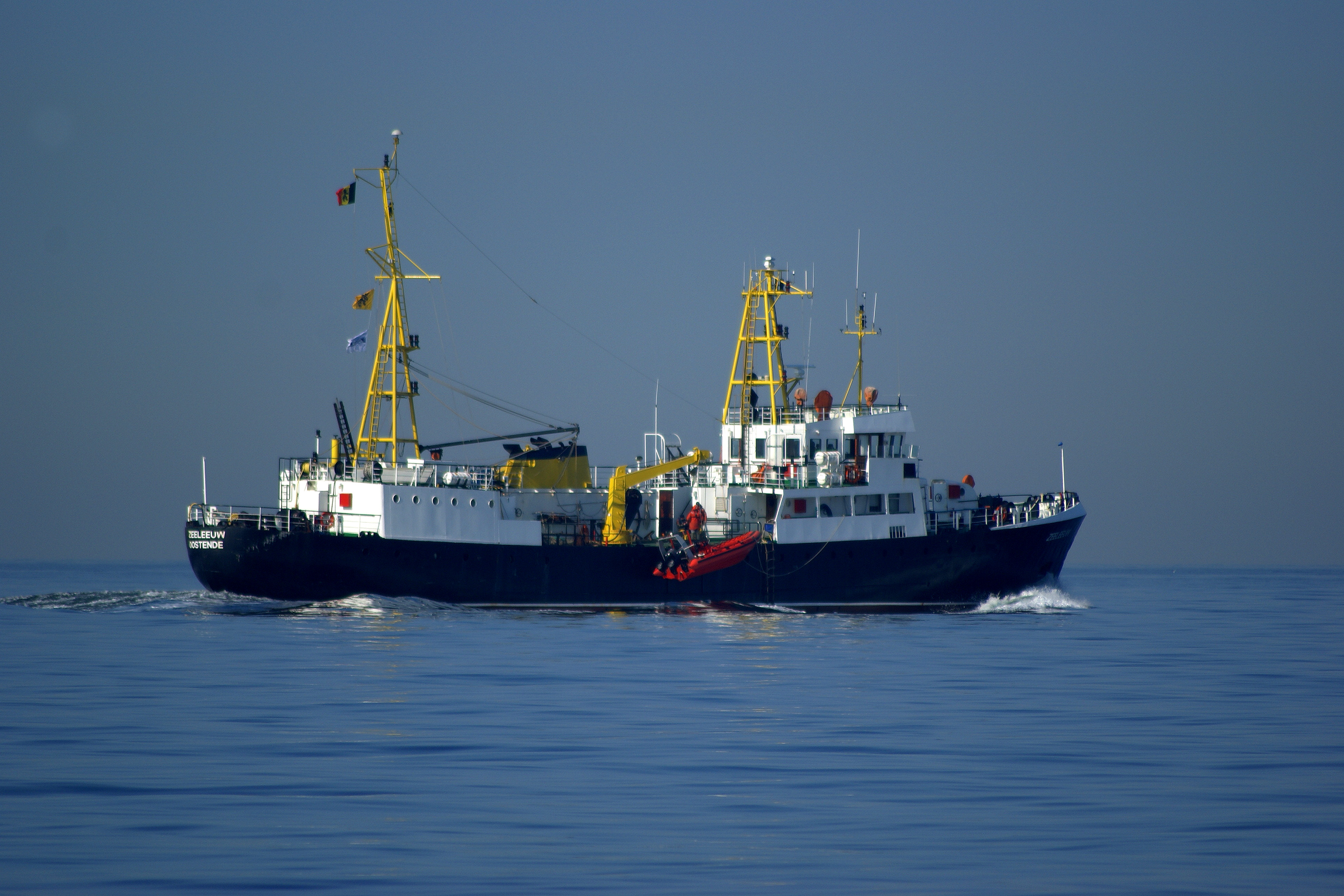
- RV Zeeleeuw

History

Belgium
- Name: Zeeleeuw
- Owner: VLOOT dab
- Launched: 1977
- Home port: Ostend, Belgium
- Identification: IMO number: 8424903; MMSI number: 634124000; Callsign: 5ZZI
- Status: Active as of 2018

General characteristics
- Type: Oceanographic research ship
- Displacement: 693 cubic metres
- Length: 55.60 meters
- Beam: 9.00 meters
- Draft: 3.65 meters
- Installed power: 1192 kW
- Propulsion: 2 Engines: ABC 6MDXC - 750 - 080 A
- Speed: 14.5 knots
- Complement: Maximum 12 passengers
- Crew: 10
- Sensors & processing systems: M252+C252 radar system; Leica DGPS Mx 421B (Back-up MX200/50R) positioning system

The RV Zeeleeuw was a marine research vessel owned, maintained, and operated by VLOOT dab. The Flanders Marine Institute took care of the coordination of the scientific program and managed the research equipment.

Formerly a pilot vessel, the RV Zeeleeuw was, in 2000, rebuilt for research purposes. It had numerous assignments, including a monthly voyage to environmental monitoring stations. The vessel was also used for studies involving the environmental impact of wind farms, monitoring of seabirds and sea mammals, research of the marine biodiversity, data collection of the impact of pollutants on the marine environment, etc. The ship operated in Belgian maritime waters as well as French and Dutch coastal waters and the Western Scheldt.

After more than 10 years of service, there was a need for a modern, well equipped vessel, with a restricted draught needed for an optimal accessibility to shallow coastal waters of the Southern Bight of the North Sea and the surrounding estuaries. In 2012 the RV Zeeleeuw was replaced by the multidisciplinary coastal research vessel RV Simon Stevin.

On May 3, 2013, the RV Zeeleeuw was donated by the Flemish Government to the Republic of Kenya. The oceanographic research vessel is now named RV Mtafiti, Swahili for ‘researcher’. In Kenya the ship continues to serve marine research and is managed by the Kenya Marine and Fisheries Research Institute (KMFRI).
