= Dropsonde =

Meteorological instrument

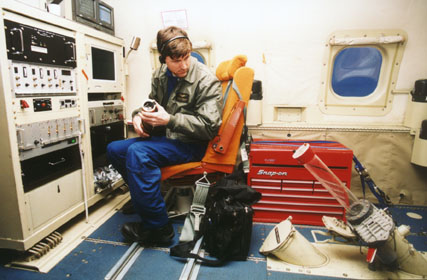
Dropsonde delivery system on a NOAA P-3 Hurricane Hunter.

A dropsonde is an expendable weather reconnaissance device created by the National Center for Atmospheric Research (NCAR), designed to be dropped from an aircraft at altitude over water to measure (and therefore track) storm conditions as the device falls to the surface. The sonde contains a GPS receiver, along with pressure, temperature, and humidity (PTH) sensors to capture atmospheric profiles and thermodynamic data. It typically relays this data to a computer in the aircraft by radio transmission.

== Usage ==
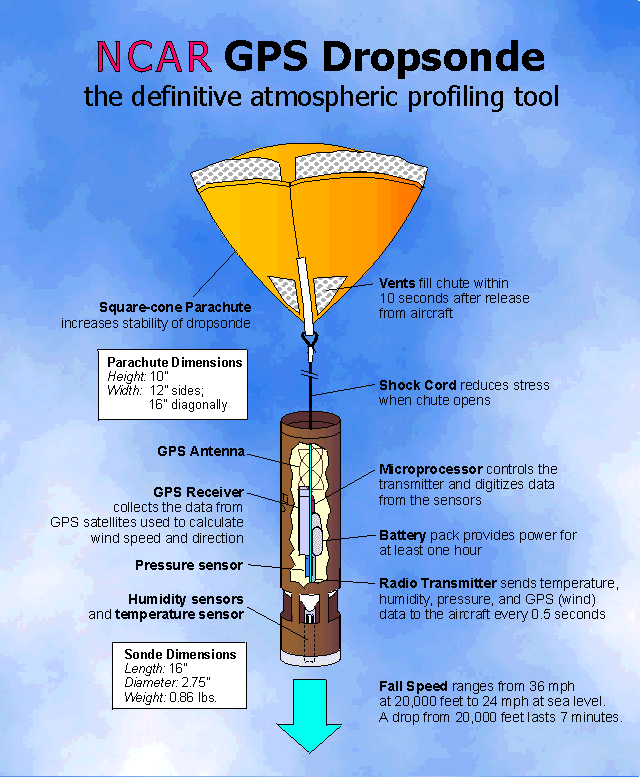
A diagram of an NCAR GPS dropsonde

Dropsonde instruments are typically the only current method to measure the winds and barometric pressure through the atmosphere and down to the sea surface within the core of tropical cyclones far from land-based weather radar. The data obtained is usually fed via radio into supercomputers for numerical weather prediction, enabling forecasters to better predict the effects and intensity, based on computer-generated models using data gathered from previous storms under similar conditions. This helps meteorologists to more reliably establish a storm's potential damage, based on those factors.

Since the early 1970s, United States Air Force Reserves Hurricane Hunters of the 53rd Weather Reconnaissance Squadron based at Keesler Air Force Base in Biloxi, Mississippi, have employed dropsondes while flying over the ocean to obtain meteorological data on the structure of hurricanes deemed to be of possible concern to coastal and inland locations in the northern Atlantic ocean, northeastern Pacific ocean, and the Gulf of Mexico. During a typical hurricane season, Hurricane Hunters deploy 1,000 to 5000 sondes on training and storm missions.

Aircraft reconnaissance missions are also sometimes requested to investigate the broader atmospheric structure over the ocean when cyclones may pose a significant threat to the United States. These interests include not only potential hurricanes, but also possible snow events (like nor'easters) or significant tornado outbreaks. The dropsondes are used to supplement the large gaps over oceans within the global network of daily radiosonde launches. Typically satellite data provides an estimate of conditions in such areas, but the increased precision of sondes can improve forecasts, particularly of the storm path.

Dropsondes may also be employed during meteorological research projects.

== Device and launch details ==
The sonde is a lightweight system designed to be operated by one person and is launched through a chute installed in the measuring aircraft. The device's descent is slowed and stabilized by a small square-cone parachute, allowing for more readings to be taken before it reaches the ocean surface. The parachute is designed to immediately deploy after release so as to reduce or eliminate any pendulum effect, and the device typically drops for four to fifteen minutes, depending on the altitude of the drop. The sonde has a casing of stiff cardboard to protect electronics and form a more stable aerodynamic profile.

To obtain data in a tropical cyclone, an aircraft (in the US, operated either by NOAA or the U.S. Air Force) flies into the system. A series of dropsondes are typically released as the plane passes through the storm, typically launched with greatest frequency near the center of the storm, including into the eyewall and eye (center), if one exists. Most drops are performed at a flight level of around 10,000 feet (approx. 3,000 meters).

The dropsonde sends back data, which includes:

1. The date and time of the drop. Time is always in UTC.
2. Location of the drop, indicated by the latitude, longitude, and Marsden square.
3. The pressure, temperature, dewpoint depression, twice every second, and wind speed, and wind direction four times every second.
4. The data system onboard the aircraft reduces these data to one measurement per second and extrapolates the pressure at the sea surface from the last recorded measurement.

Also included in the report is information on the aircraft, the mission, the dropsonde itself, and other remarks. These data are typically sent from the aircraft to the ground in near-real time for use in weather forecasting.

== Driftsondes ==
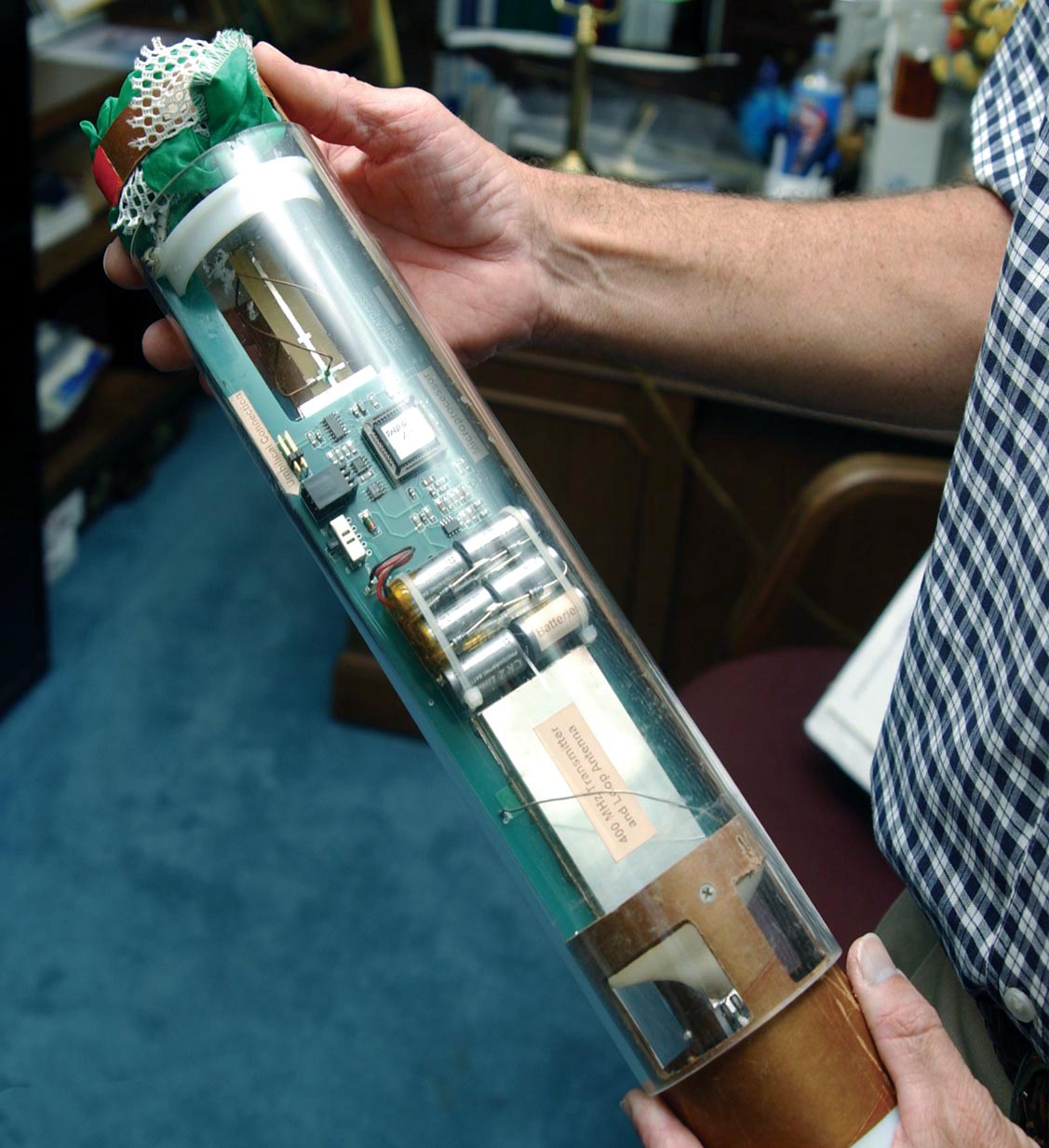
Dropsonde (source US Air Force)

A driftsonde is a high altitude, durable weather balloon holding a transmitter and a bank (35 in the first models) of miniature dropsonde capsules which can then be dropped at automatic intervals or remotely. The water-bottle-sized transmitters in the dropsondes have enough power to send information to the balloon during their parachute-controlled fall. The balloon carries a larger transmitter powerful enough to relay readings to a satellite. The single-use sensor packages cost US$300 to $400 each.

After being introduced in April 2007, around a thousand a year are expected to be used to track winds in hurricane breeding grounds off of West Africa, which are outside the operating region of hurricane hunter planes.

== See also ==
- Atmospheric science
- Radiosonde
