= Cheryl A. Zimmer =

Conservation biologist

Cheryl Ann Zimmer (Cheryl Ann Butman)
- Born: Cheryl Ann Hannan; 1954 (age 71–72)
- Scientific career
- Thesis: Initial settlement of marine invertebrate larvae : the role of passive sinking in a near-bottom turbulent flow environment (1984)
- Doctoral advisor: J. Frederick Grassle

Cheryl A. Zimmer is a conservation biologist whose research interests are focused marine population ecology, specifically the role of hydrodynamics as a driving force in the evolution of marine life.

== Education and career ==
Zimmer has a B.A. (1976) and an M.A. (1980) from San Jose State University (1976). She earned her Ph.D. in 1984 from the Massachusetts Institute of Technology where she worked with J. Frederick Grassle. From 1986 to 2000, Zimmer was a scientist at Woods Hole Oceanographic Institution; as of 2021 she is a professor at the University of California, Los Angeles where she runs the Zimmer Lab, in collaboration with her husband and colleague Richard Zimmer.

=== Selected publications ===
- Hannan, Cheryl Ann (1984). "Planktonic larvae may act like passive particles in turbulent near-bottom flows1". Limnology and Oceanography. 29 (5): 1108–1116. Bibcode:1984LimOc..29.1108H. doi:10.4319/lo.1984.29.5.1108. ISSN 1939-5590.
- Butman, Cheryl Ann; Grassle, Judith P.; Webb, Christine M. (June 1988). "Substrate choices made by marine larvae settling in still water and in a flume flow". Nature. 333 (6175): 771–773. Bibcode:1988Natur.333..771B. doi:10.1038/333771a0. ISSN 1476-4687. S2CID 4342738.
- Butman, Cheryl Ann (2003). "Larval settlement of soft-sediment invertebrates: the spatial scales of pattern explained by active habitat selection and the emerging role of hydrodynamical processes". In Barnes, Harold (ed.). Oceanography and marine biology an annual review. Routledge. pp. 89–138. ISBN 978-0-203-40068-5. OCLC 1139888870.
- Fingerut, Jonathan T.; Zimmer, Cheryl Ann; Zimmer, Richard K. (2003-10-01). "Patterns and Processes of Larval Emergence in an Estuarine Parasite System". The Biological Bulletin. 205 (2): 110–120. doi:10.2307/1543232. ISSN 0006-3185. JSTOR 1543232. PMID 14583509. S2CID 9861464.
- Garland, Elizabeth D.; Zimmer, Cheryl Ann; Lentz, Steven J. (May 2002). "Larval distributions in inner-shelf waters: The roles of wind-driven cross-shelf currents and diel vertical migrations". Limnology and Oceanography. 47 (3): 803–817. Bibcode:2002LimOc..47..803G. doi:10.4319/lo.2002.47.3.0803. ISSN 0024-3590. S2CID 86452791.

== Awards and honors ==
- Young Investigator Award, Office of Naval Research (1986)
- Fellow, American Association for the Advancement of Science (1996)
- Pew Fellows Program in Marine Conservation (1997)
