= Digital Earth Reference Model =

The term Digital Earth Reference Model (DERM) was coined by Tim Foresman in context with a vision for an all encompassing geospatial platform as an abstract for information flow in support of Al Gore's vision for a Digital Earth. The Digital Earth reference model seeks to facilitate and promote the use of georeferenced information from multiple sources over the Internet. A digital Earth reference model defines a fixed global reference frame for the Earth using four principles of a digital system, namely:

1. Discrete partitioning using regular or irregular cell mesh, tiling or Grid;
2. Data acquisition using signal processing theory (sampling and quantizing) for assigning binary values from continuous analog or other digital sources to the discrete cell partitions;
3. An ordering or naming of cells that can provide both unique spatial indexing and geographic location address;
4. A set of mathematical operations built on the indexing for algebraic, geometric, Boolean and image processing transforms, etc.

The distinction between "digital" versus "analog" Earth reference model is made in the manner the entire Earth surface is covered. Tessellation refer to a finite number of objects/cells that cover the surface as discrete partitions while Lattice refer to ordered sets of points that cover the surface in continuous vector space. The mathematical frame for a digital Earth reference model is a tessellation while the mathematical frame for an analog Earth reference is a lattice.

The value of a digital Earth reference model to encode information about the Earth is akin to the value obtained from other digital technologies, namely synchronization of the physical domain with the information domain, such as in digital audio and digital photography. Efficiencies are found in data storage, processing, integration, discovery, transmission, visualization, aggregation, and analytical, fusion and modeling transforms. Data reference to a Digital Earth Reference Model (DERM) becomes ubiquitous facilitating distributed spatial queries such as “What is here?” and “What has changed?”. Image and signal processing theory can be utilized to operate on data referenced to a DERM.

The DERM structure is data independent allowing for the general quantization of all georeferenced data sources onto the common grid. Application, algorithms and operations can then be developed on the grid independent of data sources.

Approaches using an analog reference require rigorous manual conflation to satisfy the creation of digital products such as digital maps or other cartographic, navigation or geospatial information (see also GIS). However, digital models are weaker at geometric transformations where translation, scaling and rotation must conform to the discrete cell locations wherein on an analog model with a continuum of locations geometric transformation are straight forward with no requirements for reprocessing or resampling.

A cell shape in such representations can be critical to the validity, adaptability and usefulness of the grid. As rectilinear structures are intuitive but lack optimization characteristics as a tessellation especially when tiled to a sphere, other schemes including voronoi regions, peano curves, triangles and hexagonal tilings have been advanced as superior alternatives.

Many ordering and naming models have been implemented as geospatial database indexing for efficient data retrieval (R-Trees, QTM, HHC). Few of these models have encompassed a complete digital Earth reference model where both a formation of digits that represent a hierarchy where the index contains a parent child relationship and a formation of digits that monotonically converges by a set modulus to all vector Reals.

The International Society on Digital Earth has a standing committee considering DERM implementations and standards which includes both the Earth reference frame and the ancillary requirements for metadata and attribute semantics.

== DGGS standard ==
The Open Geospatial Consortium has a spatial reference system standard based on the DERM called a "Discrete Global Grid" System (DGGS). According to OGC "a DGGS is a spatial reference system that uses a hierarchical tessellation of cells to partition and address the globe. DGGS are characterized by the properties of their cell structure, geo-encoding, quantization strategy and associated mathematical functions. The OGC DGGS standard supports the specification of standardized DGGS infrastructures that enable the integrated analysis of very large, multi-source, multi-resolution, multi-dimensional, distributed geospatial data. Interoperability between OGC DGGS implementations is anticipated through extension interface encodings of OGC Web Services.". Thus, the DGGS is a discrete, hierarchical, information grid with an addressing (or indexing) scheme to assign unique addresses to each cell across the entire DGGS Domain.
