= Graessle =

Gräßle or Graessle is a German surname. Notable people with the surname include:

- Adam Graessle (born 1984), American football player
- Ingeborg Gräßle (born 1961), German politician
- Isabelle Graesslé (born 1959), French theologian

== See also ==
- Grassle
