= World Meteorological Organization squares =

System of codes for 10×10-degree sectors of Earth's surface

World Meteorological Organization (WMO) squares is a system of geocodes that divides a world map with latitude-longitude gridlines into grid cells of 10° latitude by 10° longitude, each with a unique, 4-digit numeric identifier. On the plate carrée projection, the grid cells appear square; however, if the Mercator projection is used, the grid cells appear 'stretched' vertically nearer the tops and bottoms of the map. On the actual surface of the Globe, the cells are approximately "square" only adjacent to the Equator, and become progressively narrower and tapered (also with curved northern and southern boundaries) as they approach the poles, and cells adjoining the poles are unique in possessing three faces rather than four.

Each 10°x10° square is allocated a number between 1000 and 7817. The numbering system is based first on "global quadrant" numbers where 1=NE, 3=SE, 5=SW, 7=NW which gives the initial digit of any square code (1xxx, 3xxx, 5xxx, 7xxx). The second digit (x0xx through x8xx) indicates the number of tens of degrees latitude (north in global quadrants 1 and 7, south in global quadrants 3 and 5) of the 'minimum' square boundary (nearest to the Equator), i.e. a cell extending between 10°N and 20°N (or 10°S and 20°S) has this digit = 1, a cell extending between 20°N and 30°N has this digit = 2, etc. The third and fourth digits (xx00 through xx17) similarly indicate the number of tens of degrees of longitude of the 'minimum' square boundary, nearest to the Prime Meridian. By way of illustration, the square 1000 thus extends from 0°N to 10°N, 0°E to 10°E, and the square 7817 from 80°N to 90°N, 170°W to 180°W, adjacent to the major portion of the International Date Line. In this manner, reverse-engineering (decoding) the relevant square boundaries from any particular WMO Square identifier is straightforward, in contrast to some other similar systems e.g. Marsden squares.

WMO squares are also used as the basis for the c-squares system for spatial indexing, which further divides 10°x10° WMO squares into smaller units of 5°x5°, 1°x1°, 0.5°x0.5°, 0.1°x0.1°, and so on.

== See also ==
- Geocode
- Grid (spatial index)
- Marsden Square
- C-squares
- QDGC
