= AquaMaps =

- Website type: Species distribution modelling system for (mostly) marine species
- Area served: Worldwide
- Website: www.aquamaps.org
- Commercial: No
- Launched: 2006; 20 years ago
- Current status: Active

AquaMaps is a collaborative project with the aim of producing computer-generated (and ultimately, expert reviewed) predicted global distribution maps for marine species on a 0.5 × 0.5 degree grid of the oceans based on data available through online species databases such as FishBase and SeaLifeBase and species occurrence records from OBIS or GBIF and using an environmental envelope model (see niche modelling) in conjunction with expert input. The underlying model represents a modified version of the relative environmental suitability (RES) model developed by Kristin Kaschner to generate global predictions of marine mammal occurrences.

== Project history and current content ==
Workshops to develop the approach to be used in AquaMaps (initially known as "HCMAP" or the Half Degree Cell Mapping Project) were held at IFM-GEOMAR in Kiel, Germany over the period 2004-2006, culminating in the release of AquaMaps as a component in the then FishBase web-based suite of available tools in 2006, followed by its own "AquaMaps" project website in 2007. By March 2007, the website contained links to pre-prepared maps for 4,141 species of fishes, 115 marine mammals, and 129 other sea life (marine invertebrates). Development of content and tools continued since that time and by 2019, the project held standardized distribution maps for over 33,500 species of fishes, marine mammals and invertebrates combined. The project is also expanding to incorporate freshwater species, with more than 600 biodiversity maps for freshwater fishes of the Americas available as at November 2009. AquaMaps predictions have been validated successfully for a number of species using independent data sets and the model was shown to perform equally well or better than other standard species distribution models, when faced with the currently existing suboptimal input data.

In addition to displaying individual maps per species, AquaMaps provides tools to generate species richness maps by higher taxon, plus a spatial search for all species overlapping a specified grid square. There is also the facility to create custom maps for any species via the web by modifying the input parameters and re-running the map generating algorithm in real time, and a variety of other tools including the investigation of effects of climate change on species distributions (see relevant section of the AquaMaps search page).

== Coordination ==
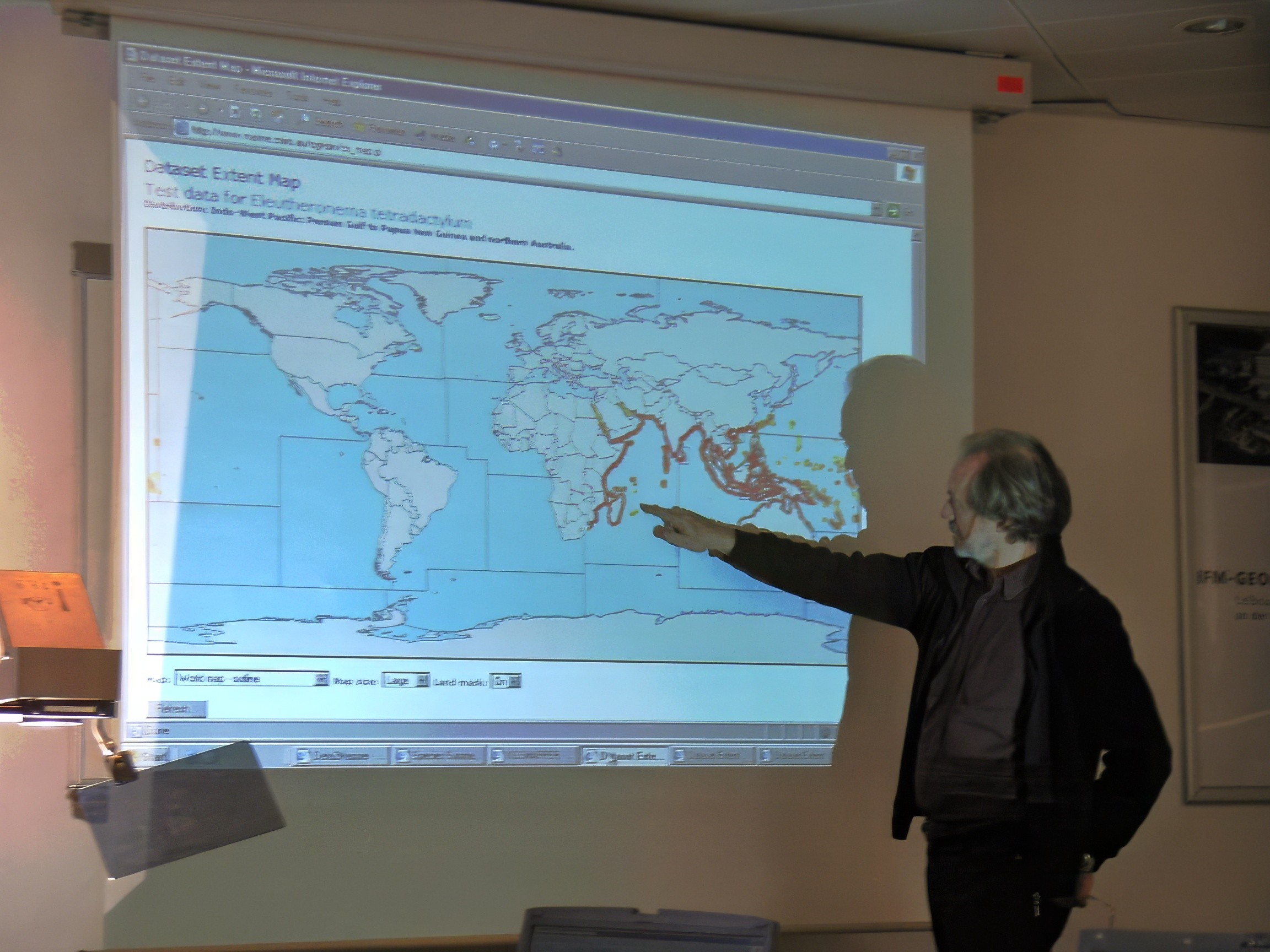
Rainer Froese, founder and initial AquaMaps project coordinator, discusses a species modelled distribution at a project workshop in Kiel, October 2005

At its inception, the project was coordinated by Dr Rainer Froese of IFM-GEOMAR and involved contributions from other research institutes including the Evolutionary Biology and Ecology Lab, Albert-Ludwigs-University Freiburg, University of British Columbia (UBC), the Swedish Museum of Natural History (NRM - Naturhistoriska Riksmuseet), the WorldFish Center in Malaysia, and CSIRO Marine and Atmospheric Research in Australia. The initial creation of AquaMaps was supported by MARA, Pew Fellows Program in Marine Conservation, INCOFISH, Sea Around Us Project, Biogeoinformatics of Hexacorals, FishBase and SeaLifeBase.

In 2023 it was announced that University of British Columbia Researcher Dr. Gabriel Reygondeau had succeeded Dr Froese as the Aquamaps project coordinator, with Aquamaps to be incorporated into a "new workflow called Aqua-X [subsequently styled "AquaX"] – an ensemble modelling framework that will include the next-generation AquaMaps, nine other species distribution models, and a new website". Dr. Reygondeau has subsequently established a laboratory at the Rosenstiel School of Marine, Atmospheric, and Earth Science at the University of Miami, Florida, where the next generation of AquaMaps will developed within the "AquaX" framework.

== Research use ==
A multi-author study by E. Sala et al. utilizing AquaMaps modelled data for marine fishes and invertebrates, entitled "Protecting the global ocean for biodiversity, food and climate", was published in the prestigious journal Nature in 2021. For another recent paper using AquaMaps data, see D. Hodapp et al., "Climate change disrupts core habitats of marine species" published in 2023 in Global Change Biology.

== See also ==
- Environmental niche modelling
- Biogeography
- Biodiversity informatics
- Marine biology
- C-squares - global grid system utilized by AquaMaps for data storage and map creation
