= DOQ =

DOQ may refer:

- Digital orthophoto quadrangle - type of aerial photography or satellite imagery
- Denominación de Origen - regulatory classification system primarily for Spanish wines
- Priorat (DOQ) - a Spanish Denominación de Origen Calificada
- ISO 639:d - code for Dominican Sign Language
- DNS over QUIC - an expansion of the DNS standard, wants to combine DoH and DOT
