= Grassle =

Grassle is a surname. Notable people with the surname include:

- J. Frederick Grassle (1939–2018), American oceanographer, marine biologist, and professor
- Judith Grassle (born 1936), Marine ecologist
- Karen Grassle (born 1942), American actress

== See also ==
- Grassley
- Ingeborg Gräßle (born 1961), German politician
