= Grassley =

Grassley is a surname. Notable people with the surname include:

- Chuck Grassley (born 1933), American politician
- Pat Grassley (born 1983), American politician

== See also ==
- Grassle
