= Xplanet =

Renderer for planetary and Solar System images

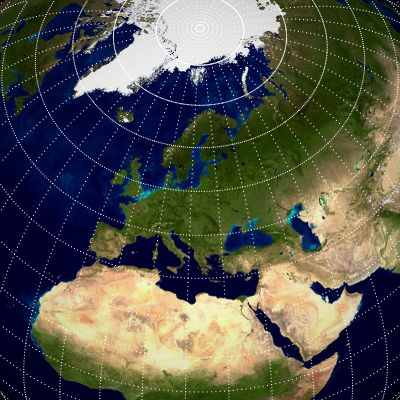
Xplanet-generated rendering

Xplanet is a renderer for planetary and Solar System images, capable of producing various types of graphics depicting the Solar System. It is normally used to create computer wallpapers, which may be updated with the latest cloud maps or the regions of Earth which are in sunlight. Xplanet is free software released under the GNU GPL.

== Flat maps ==
Xplanet can be used to produce projected maps of any planet (but typically Earth), for example Mollweide projections which show the whole Earth at once, or Mercator projections with a rectangular appearance suitable for filling the screen.

It is possible to overlay clouds or text (such as the location of recent events) onto these maps; a popular option is shading areas currently experiencing night.

== Planetary images ==
Xplanet can also be used to render more general views of objects in the Solar System, such as a view of the Earth from the Moon. In more recent versions, Xplanet depicts eclipses, and some of its images show Jupiter's moons casting an eclipse onto the planet.

== Technical ==
Xplanet runs on Linux, Mac OS X and other Unix operating systems and also on Microsoft Windows, and was derived from an older Unix application called xearth.

It can either generate wallpaper, save the resulting image, or produce textual output detailing the locations of various objects.

Configuration is done by modifying a text file. The Windows version comes with a simple editor called winXPlanetBG to assist in updating the configurations and helps to download the cloud maps automatically. OSXplanet is an interactive wallpaper derivative for the Mac OS X.

== Incorporation into other utilities ==
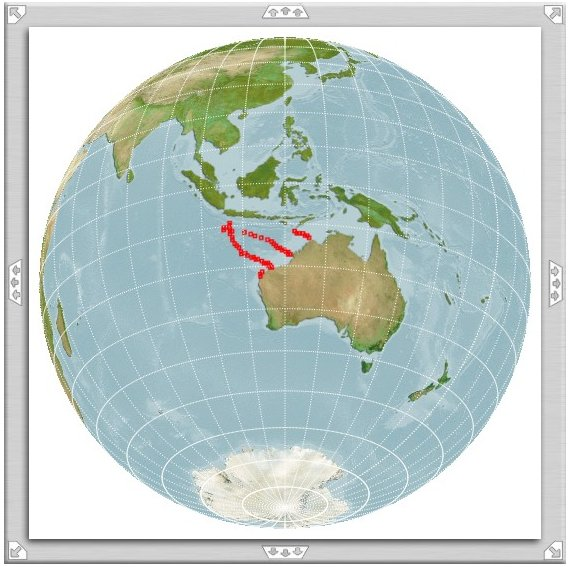
Example "globe view" produced with the online c-squares mapper; conversion from flat map to orthographic projection uses Xplanet, installed as part of the mapper utility

The c-squares mapper, a web-based mapping utility constructed at CSIRO in Australia in 2002 for displaying the spatial extent of c-squares on the surface of the Earth, was upgraded in 2005–2006 to incorporate Xplanet software in order to display "globe views" (example at right). These views are user-rotatable and zoomable and can offer more realistic views for either Pacific Ocean- or polar- centred data than are possible with a flat map (e.g. equirectangular) projection. A technical description of the c-squares mapper installation process (version 3 onwards), which also requires installation of Xplanet, is available at http://www.marine.csiro.au/csquares/mapper_README.html (also available via Sourceforge).

== XplanetFX ==
Until 2013, XplanetFX was a GTK-frontend for Xplanet under Linux. It provided a simple to use GUI to configure Xplanet and schedule renderings. It also claimed to produce higher quality renderings. XplanetFX was free software released under a permissive vanity license. It closed down when many of the sources it used were shut down or paywalled.

== See also ==
- Wikipedia:Producing maps with xplanet
- EarthDesk
