= EarthDesk =

Software changing computer desktop image to an Earth's view

- EarthDesk on Mac OS X
- Developer(s): Xeric Design, Ltd.
- Stable release: 6.0 (Mac), 5.2 (Windows) / August 2012 (Mac), April 2012 (Windows)
- Operating system: macOS, Windows 2000, Windows XP, Windows Vista and Windows 7
- Type: Computer wallpaper changer
- License: Commercial
- Website: www.xericdesign.com/earthdesk.php

EarthDesk is a software application for Microsoft Windows and macOS that changes the computer user's desktop image to a constantly updating view of Earth. The software can be set to update daylight and moonlight coverage on the map, as well as live cloud images which are superimposed onto the map. The cloud option requires an Internet connection.

== Features ==
The map is fully customisable. Users can choose between various map projections, whether to use a satellite image or political map, and whether to show night time and moonlight. The map can be centered and zoomed up to 400% anywhere on Earth. In addition to centering on a fixed point, EarthDesk can centre on the current position of the Moon or Sun. EarthDesk supports multiple monitors.

== See also ==
- Xplanet
- OSXplanet
