= Interim Register of Marine and Nonmarine Genera =

Taxonomic database

- Website type: Taxonomic database system for (mostly) genera and higher taxonomic ranks
- Headquarters: Ostend, Belgium
- Country of origin: Australia, 2006-2016; Belgium, 2016-current
- Area served: Worldwide
- Owner: Flanders Marine Institute (VLIZ)
- Founder: Tony Rees, Australia
- Website: www.irmng.org
- Commercial: No
- Launched: 2006; 20 years ago
- Current status: Active

The Interim Register of Marine and Nonmarine Genera (IRMNG) is a taxonomic database which attempts to cover published genus names for all domains of life (also including subgenera in zoology), from 1758 in zoology (1753 in botany) up to the present, arranged in a single, internally consistent taxonomic hierarchy, for the benefit of Biodiversity Informatics initiatives plus general users of biodiversity (taxonomic) information. In addition to containing over 500,000 published genus name instances as at July 2024 (also including subgeneric names in zoology), the database holds over 1.7 million species names (1.3 million listed as "accepted"), although this component of the data is not maintained in as current or complete state as the genus-level holdings. IRMNG can be queried online for access to the latest version of the dataset and is also made available as periodic snapshots or data dumps for import/upload into other systems as desired. The database was commenced in 2006 at the then CSIRO Division of Marine and Atmospheric Research in Australia and, since 2016, has been hosted at the Flanders Marine Institute (VLIZ) in Belgium.

== Description ==
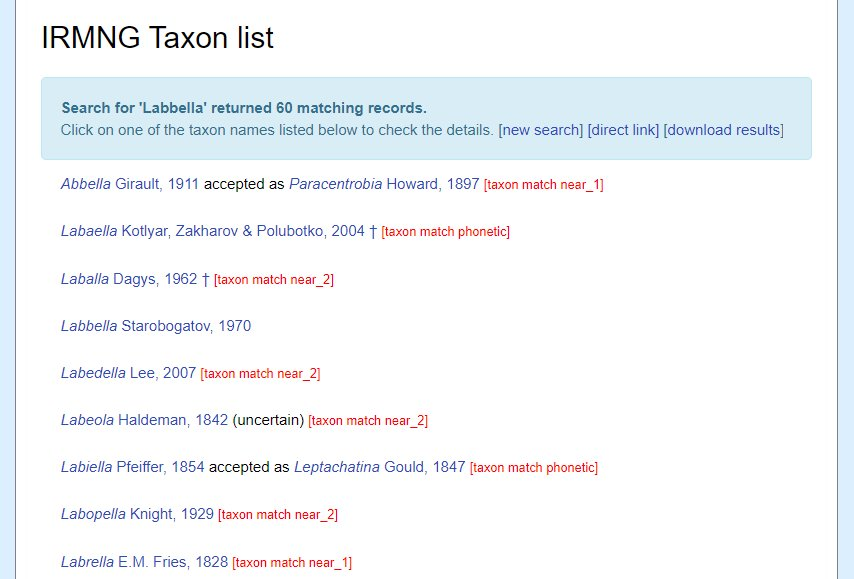
Example "fuzzy" genus search result on IRMNG, December 2023

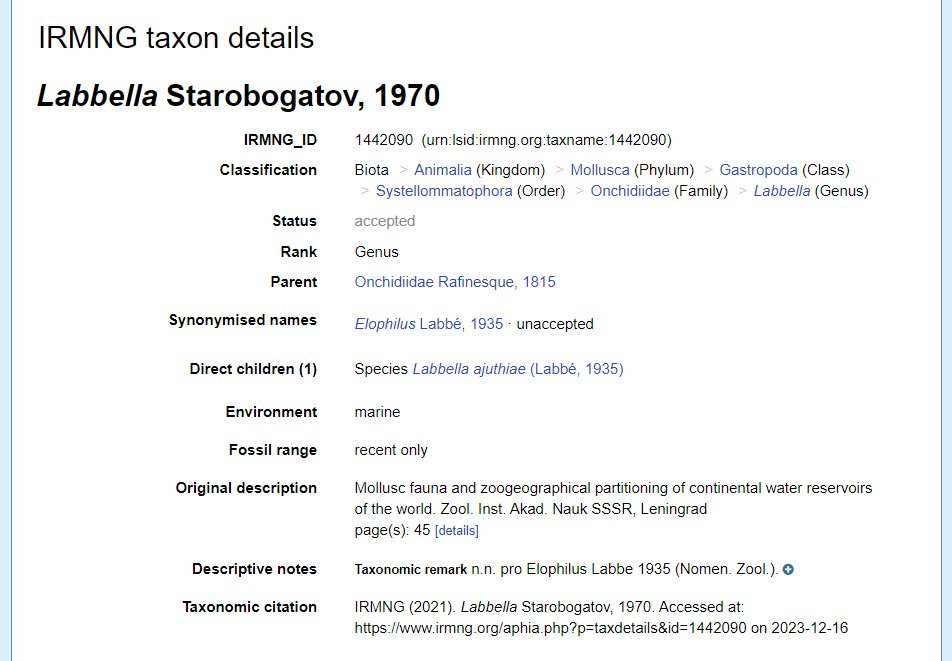
Example genus-level taxon page on IRMNG, December 2023

IRMNG contains scientific names (only) of the genera (plus zoological subgenera, see below), a subset of species, and principal higher ranks of most plants, animals and other kingdoms, both living and extinct, within a standardized taxonomic hierarchy, with associated machine-readable information on habitat (e.g. marine/nonmarine) and extant/fossil status for the majority of entries. The database aspires to provide complete coverage of both accepted and unaccepted genus names across all kingdoms, with a subset only of species names included as a secondary activity. The names in IRMNG fall within the governance of the International Code of Zoological Nomenclature for zoology (covering animals, zoological protists, and trace fossils attributable to the activities of animals), the International Code of Nomenclature for algae, fungi, and plants (ICN or ICNafp) for botany including those groups, the International Code of Nomenclature of Prokaryotes for Bacteria and Archaea, and the International Committee on Taxonomy of Viruses for that group.

In its July 2024 release, IRMNG contained 508,851 genus names, of which 240,625 were listed as "accepted", 123,117 "unaccepted", 23,192 of "other" status i.e. interim unpublished, nomen dubium, nomen nudum, taxon inquirendum or temporary name, and 121,917 as "uncertain" (unassessed for taxonomic status at this time). The data originate from a range of (frequently domain-specific) print, online and database sources, including (among others) Nomenclator Zoologicus for animals and Index Nominum Genericorum for plants, and are reorganised into a common data structure to support a variety of online queries, generation of individual taxon pages, and bulk data supply to other biodiversity informatics projects. IRMNG content can be queried and displayed freely via the web, and download files of the data down to the taxonomic rank of genus as at specific dates are available in the Darwin Core Archive (DwC-A) format. The data include homonyms (with their authorities), including both available (validly published) and selected unavailable names.

Since in zoology (only) names of subgenera are included, along with genera, in the "genus-group" and are deemed by the "principle of coordination" to have been simultaneously published at both ranks even if not explicitly so at the time of original publication, they are included as available generic names in the IRMNG compilation but marked as "unaccepted names" (not currently used as the accepted name for a genus) unless where they are currently in use as the accepted name for a genus. By contrast, the botanical Code (ICN), which covers Algae, Fungi and Plants, lacks such a provision, so subgenera published under that Code are not included in IRMNG except where they have been explicitly re-ranked to be botanical genera, in which case a new "name" is considered to have been created at that point with authorship given in the form of the original author(s) of the subgenus in parentheses, followed by the name of the author(s) responsible for the newly elevated status. (Note: The inclusion of zoological subgenera also conforms to the previous practice of S.A. Neave and the compilers of Nomenclator Zoologicus, the initial extended title of which work (first 4 volumes) was "A list of the names of genera and subgenera in zoology from the tenth edition of Linnaeus 1758 to the end of 1935".)

Estimates for "accepted names" as held at May 2023 are as follows, broken down by kingdom, following the methodology used in Rees et al., 2020 (updated using 2023 data):

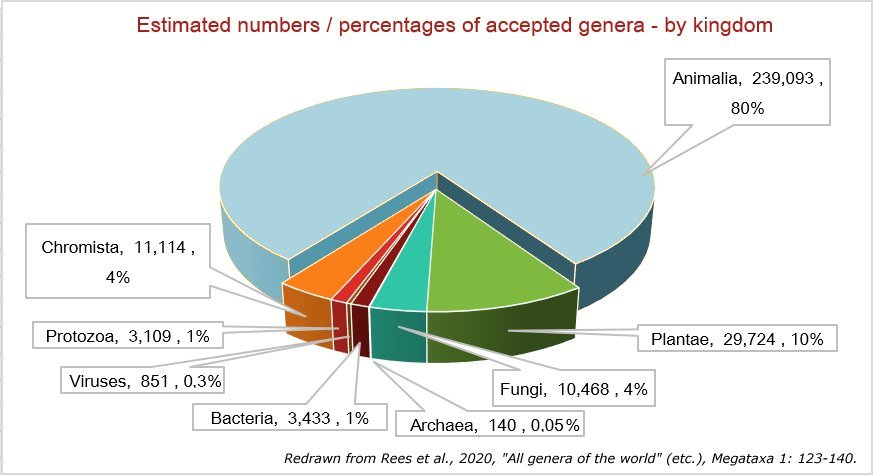
IRMNG holdings: estimated accepted genus totals by kingdom - previous totals based on Rees et al., 2020

- Animalia: 189,287 accepted genus names plus notional 50% of 104,583 "uncertain" names: est. total 241,578 accepted genera
- Plantae: 25,394 accepted genus names plus notional 50% of 13,838 "uncertain" names: est. total 32,313 accepted genera
- Fungi: 10,702 accepted genus names plus notional 50% of 358 "uncertain" names: est. total 10,881 accepted genera
- Chromista: 9,912 accepted genus names plus notional 50% of 2,379 "uncertain" names: est. total 11,102 accepted genera
- Protozoa: 999 accepted genus names plus notional 50% of 2,164 "uncertain" names: est. total 2,081 accepted genera
- "Bacteria": 3,337 accepted genus names plus notional 50% of 223 "uncertain" names: est. total 3,393 accepted genera
- "Archaea": 140 accepted genus names (no "uncertain" genera)
- "Viruses": 851 accepted genus names (no "uncertain" genera)

== Database location and hosting ==
IRMNG was initiated and designed by Australian biologist and data manager Tony Rees in 2006. For his work on this and other projects, GBIF awarded him the 2014 Ebbe Nielsen Prize. From 2006 to 2014 IRMNG was located at CSIRO Marine and Atmospheric Research, and was moved to the Flanders Marine Institute (VLIZ) over the period 2014–2016; from 2016 onwards all releases have been available via its new website www.irmng.org which is hosted by VLIZ. VLIZ also hosts the World Register of Marine Species (WoRMS), using a common infrastructure.

== IRMNG usage ==
Content from IRMNG is used by several global Biodiversity Informatics projects including Open Tree of Life, the Global Biodiversity Information Facility (GBIF), and the Encyclopedia of Life (EOL), in addition to others including the Atlas of Living Australia and the Global Names Architecture (GNA)'s Global Names Resolver. From 2018 onwards, IRMNG data are also being used to populate the taxonomic hierarchy and provide generic names for a range of taxa in the areas of protists (mainly kingdoms Protozoa and Chromista) in the Catalogue of Life.
