= Digital orthophoto quadrangle =

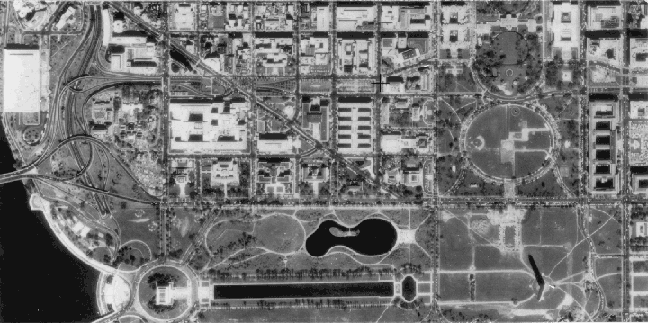
An image from a part of a digital orthophoto quadrangle of Washington, DC

A digital orthophoto quadrangle (DOQ) is aerial photography or satellite imagery that has been corrected so that its pixels are aligned with longitude and latitude lines, and have a narrowly defined region of coverage. This is a widely used format introduced by United States Geological Survey (USGS). The correction technique is called image rectification and is a large part of photogrammetry.

DOQs produced by the USGS cover an area measuring 7.5-minutes longitude by 7.5-minutes latitude (the same area covered by a USGS 1:24,000-scale topographic map, also known as a 7.5-minute quadrangle) or 3.75-minutes by 3.75-minutes. The second format is also known as a digital orthophoto quarter quadrangle (DOQQ) because each covers one quarter of a quadrangle (four 1:12,000-scale DOQQs display the same area as one 1:24,000-scale DOQ).

== See also ==
- Orthophoto
- QDGC
