= Judith Grassle =

Marine ecologist

Judith P. Grassle
- Education: Duke University
- Spouse: J. Frederick Grassle
- Scientific career
- Workplaces: Rutgers University
- Thesis: Heterogeneity of hemocyanins in several species of embryonic, larval and adult crustaceans (1968)

Judith Grassle (born on December 4, 1936) is a Professor Emeritus in the Department of Marine and Coastal Sciences at Rutgers University. Grassle is a benthic ecologist known for research on invertebrates, especially polychaete worms including the now-named Capitella teleta. Grassle became a Fellow of the American Association for the Advancement of Science in 1993.

== Education and career ==
Grassle, whose full name is Judith Helen (Payne) Grassle, received a B.Sc. for undergraduate work at University of Queensland in 1958, and Ph.D. from Duke University in 1968 with a thesis titled "Heterogeneity of hemocyanins in several species of embryonic, larval and adult crustaceans". Following postdoctoral work funded by the Office of Naval Research at the University of Queensland, Grassle joined the Marine Biological Laboratory (MBL) in Woods Hole, Massachusetts, first as an independent investigator in 1972, and then served as a Senior Scientist from 1986 to 1989. While at MBL, Grassle lectured in MBL summer classes for both Developmental Biology and Marine Ecology.

Judy Grassle and her husband J. Frederick ("Fred") Grassle, moved to Rutgers University in 1989. Fred served as the Founding Director of the Institute of Marine and Coastal Sciences, and at the time of Fred's death in 2018, Oscar Schofield commented that "without [Fred] and Judy, there would be no modern oceanography program at Rutgers". In tribute to the Grassles, the Jacques Cousteau National Estuarine Research Reserve named Grassle Marsh in Little Egg Harbor after them.

In addition to research, Judy Grassle is actively involved in service to the scientific community, especially at the Estuarine Research Federation and the AAAS, including serving on the Committee on the Coastal Ocean for the 1994 Ocean Studies Board annual report (NAP report). Judy Grassle has widely shared cultures of Capitella teleta thereby enabling other scientists to conduct work on this polychaete worm.

== Research ==
Grassle's research on polychaete worms of the genus Capitella laid the foundation to use this group of worms as model organisms for marine pollution research, embryology, and genomic investigations into the evolution of life forms that are bilaterally symmetrical (the bilaterians). In 1974, Fred and Judy Grassle published the results of a multi-year study on the response of polychaetes to an oil spill in West Falmouth; the long-term effects of this oil spill continue to be considered decades later. This research indicated that multiple species of Capitella capitata grew after the disturbance of the oil spill and established Capitella as a model organism for the response of invertebrates to marine pollution. Subsequent work published by Judy Grassle and Fred Grassle defined Capitella species as sibling species which are genetically distinct but have similar life histories. The Science paper describing these sibling species concludes with the statement that Capitella are 'ideal material for comparative studies of adaptation and genetics' which has come to fruition as Capitella teleta became the first marine polychaete with a sequenced genome. Subsequent work by Grassle expanded the description of the sibling species of Capitella based on chromosomal differences determined by karyotyping. In 2009, the full species description of Capitella teleta that were initially identified and cultured by Judy Grassle was published in a paper by Blake, JP Grassle, and Eckelbarger.

== Selected publications ==
Grassle has over fifty publications listed at Web of Science and, as of 2021, her h-index is 23 which includes publications with hundreds of citations (e.g.,).

- Grassle, JF; Grassle, JP (1974). "Opportunistic life histories and genetic systems in marine benthic polychaetes". Journal of Marine Research. 32: 253–284.
- Grassle, J; Grassle, J.F. (1976-05-07). "Sibling species in the marine pollution indicator Capitella (polychaeta)". Science. 192 (4239): 567–569. Bibcode:1976Sci...192..567G. doi:10.1126/science.1257794. ISSN 0036-8075. PMID 1257794.
- Grassle, J. P; Gelfman, C. E.; Mills, S. W. (1987). "Karyotypes of Capitella sibling species, and several species in the related genera Capitellides and Capitomastus (Polychaeta)". Karyotypes of Capitella Sibling Species, and Several Species in the Related Genera Capitellides and Capitomastus (Polychaeta) (7): 77–88. ISSN 0097-0298.
- Butman, Cheryl Ann; Grassle, Judith P.; Webb, Christine M. (June 1988). "Substrate choices made by marine larvae settling in still water and in a flume flow". Nature. 333 (6175): 771–773. Bibcode:1988Natur.333..771B. doi:10.1038/333771a0. S2CID 4342738.
- Blake, James A.; Grassle, Judith P.; Eckelbarger, Kevin J. (2009-08-31). "Capitella teleta, a new species designation for the opportunistic and experimental Capitella sp. I, with a review of the literature for confirmed records". Zoosymposia. 2 (1): 25–53. doi:10.11646/zoosymposia.2.1.6. ISSN 1178-9913.
