= ICES Statistical Rectangles =

Gridded latitude-longitude-based area notation system

- Organisation: International Council for the Exploration of the Sea
- No. issued: 11,187 (standard resolution rectangles), 100,683 (sub-rectangles)
- No. of digits: 4 (standard resolution rectangle), 5 (sub-rectangle)
- Example: 37F3 (standard resolution rectangle), 37F31 (sub-rectangle)
- Website: www.ices.dk/data/maps/Pages/ICES-statistical-rectangles.aspx

ICES Statistical Rectangles (aka "ICES Rectangles") is a gridded, latitude-longitude based area notation system covering the north-east Atlantic region developed by the International Council for the Exploration of the Sea (ICES) in the 1970s, for simplified analysis and visualization of spatial data of relevance to that organization's interests. The individual rectangles that make up the system each measure 1 degree of longitude by 0.5 degrees of latitude and are intended to be roughly square in real world use in the ICES region of interest, approximately 30 nautical miles by 30 nautical miles (55×55 km) at 60°N, although the actual width varies with latitude, gradually becoming wider than they are high south of 60°N, and narrower further north. The grid covers the region from 36°N to 85°30'N and from 44°W to 69°E (quoted as 68°30') using a set of alphanumeric identifiers, with rows of latitude (identifiers 01 through 99, from south to north) cited first, then column of longitude (identifiers A0-A3, then B0-B9, C0-C9 etc., from west to east). The last used column identifier is M8; column identifiers A4-A9, and prefix "I" (uppercase "i") i.e. columns "I"0-"I"9 are not used. The resulting grid is 113 columns by 99 rows, comprising 11,187 labelled 1×0.5 degree cells. An example cell designation is 37F3, which designates the 1×0.5 degree rectangle of which the south-west corner is 54°00'N, 03°00'E. The grid covers both land and sea areas across its designated region, but as per the interests of its originating body, is typically employed for use with marine data such as analysis of marine resources, fishing activities, seabed habitat, etc., refer example references below. The full extent of the grid is visible in published figures such as Figs. 5-8 in Williamson et al., 2017.

To accommodate the visualization and/or analysis of finer scale data than is supported by the "standard" (1×0.5 degree) rectangles, an optional fifth character (as digits 1 through 9) can be used which will place a location within a finer 9-cell (3 by 3) sub-grid, for which the individual sub-rectangles then measure 20' of longitude by 10' of latitude (approximately 10×10 nautical miles). Sub-rectangle designations go north to south, then west to east, with 1 at the north west corner and 9 at the south east.

ICES rectangles have been used for reporting and analysis in numerous marine publications since the 1970s; for recent examples see. A vector polygon representation of the ICES Statistical Rectangles is available here.

== See also ==
- List of geodesic-geocoding systems
- Geocode
