= RV Simon Stevin =

Survey ship built in 2012

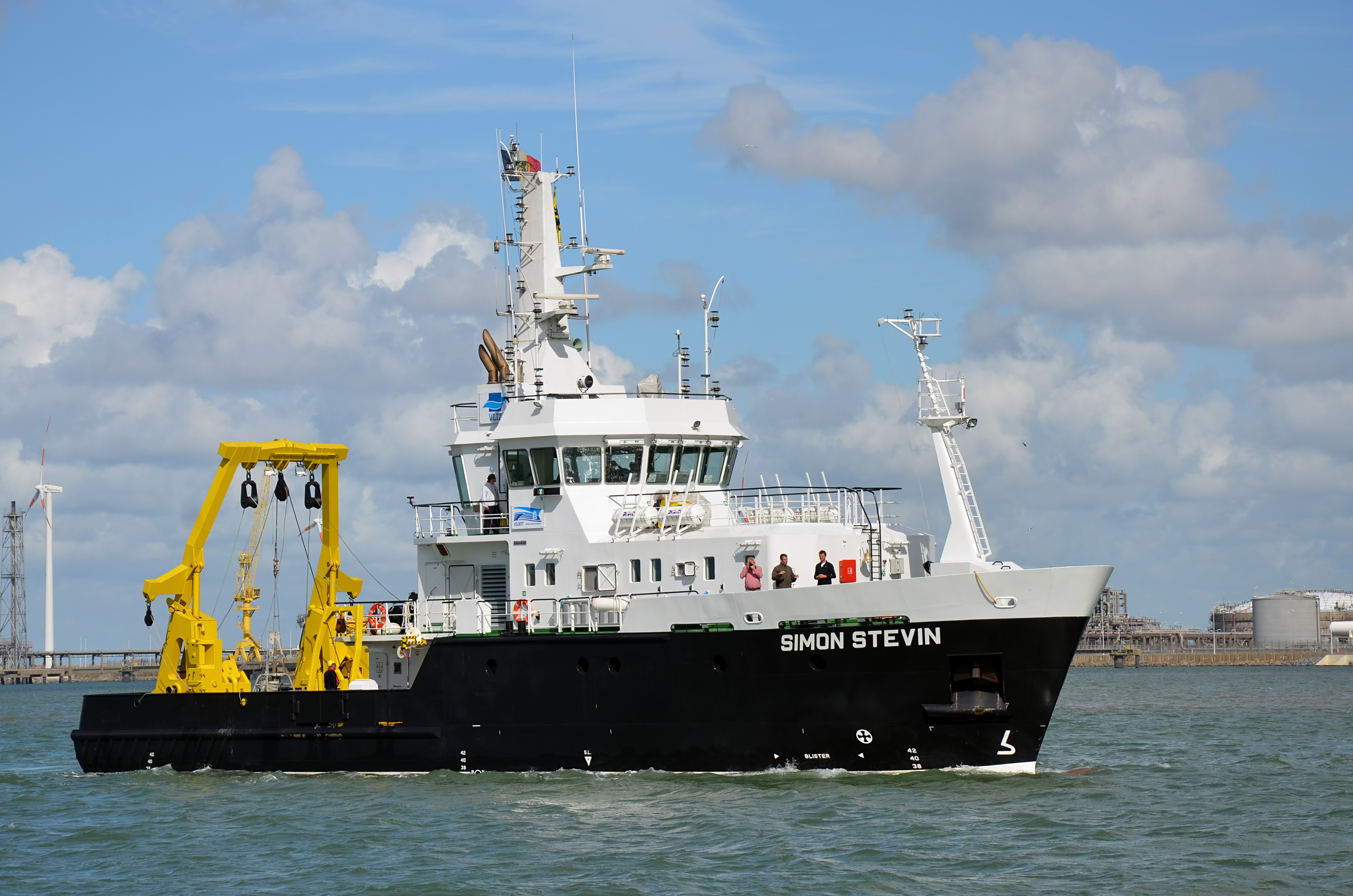
- RV Simon Stevin at Zeebrugge

History

Belgium
- Name: Simon Stevin
- Namesake: Simon Stevin
- Owner: VLOOT dab
- Launched: 25 May 2012
- Christened: 13 September 2012
- Home port: Ostend, Belgium
- Identification: IMO number: 9622681; MMSI number: 205072000; Callsign: ORBS
- Status: Active as of 2018

General characteristics
- Type: Oceanographic research vessel
- Length: 36 m (118 ft 1 in)
- Beam: 9.4 m (30 ft 10 in)
- Draught: 3.5 m (11 ft 6 in)
- Speed: 12 knots (22 km/h; 14 mph)
- Capacity: Maximum 12 passengers
- Crew: 7

RV Simon Stevin is used to perform coastal oceanographic research in the Southern Bight of the North Sea and in the eastern part of the English Channel. It also serves as training platform for students from marine scientific and maritime studies and as a test platform for new marine and maritime technologies. Pupils and students from primary and secondary schools are offered the opportunity to step aboard for educational excursions.

The vessel sails under a Belgian flag and the port of registry is Ostend. Simon Stevin mainly performs one-day journeys, but multiple-day voyages can be scheduled as well. Simon Stevin serves a broad scale of marine scientific research. In Flanders, marine research is performed at universities and public scientific institutes. The research is multidisciplinary reaching from physical oceanography, fisheries research, marine biology, microbiology, chemistry, technology, archeology to geography, geophysics and geology.

The ship corresponds to the needs of multiple marine research areas; it is equipped with all standard sampling equipment and with high technological hydro-acoustic devices that allow current measurements (Acoustic Doppler Current Profiler) and characterization of the bottom (multibeam). A highly accurate positioning of the vessel is assured by the dynamic positioning- and steering system. A diesel-electric propulsion allows sailing as a ‘silent ship’, an optimal condition for the hydro-acoustic measurements.

The construction of Simon Stevin was funded by the Flemish Government. VLOOT dab is the owner and operator (Flemish Government) and the Flanders Marine Institute, VLIZ, is responsible for the scientific program and the management of the sampling equipment.

The ship is named after the Flemish mathematician, physicist and military engineer Simon Stevin.
