= Ocean Biodiversity Information System =

Online marine biology database

- Website type: web-based data and information system
- Available in: English
- Website: www.obis.org
- Commercial: no
- Registration: not required
- Launched: May 2000
- Current status: active

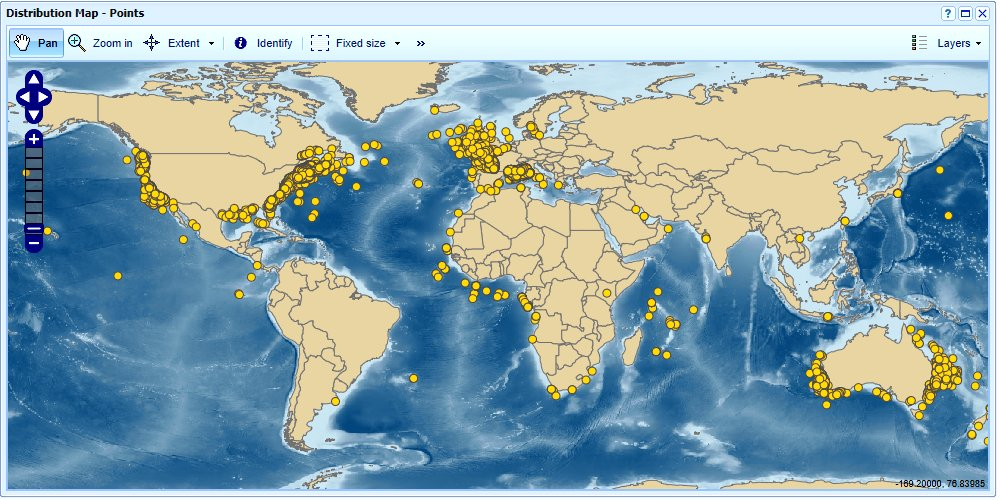
OBIS records for ocean sunfish, Mola mola, as at July 2018, visualised by the OBIS mapper (www.obis.org)

The Ocean Biodiversity Information System (OBIS), formerly Ocean Biogeographic Information System, is a web-based access point to information about the distribution and abundance of living species in the ocean. It was developed as the information management component of the ten year Census of Marine Life (CoML) (2001-2010), but is not limited to CoML-derived data, and aims to provide an integrated view of all marine biodiversity data that may be made available to it on an open access basis by respective data custodians. According to its web site as at July 2018, OBIS "is a global open-access data and information clearing-house on marine biodiversity for science, conservation and sustainable development." 8 specific objectives are listed in the OBIS site, of which the leading item is to "Provide [the] world's largest scientific knowledge base on the diversity, distribution and abundance of all marine organisms in an integrated and standardized format".

== History and current status ==
Initial ideas for OBIS were developed at a CoML meeting on benthic (bottom-dwelling) ocean life in October 1997. Recommendations from this workshop led to a web site (http://marine.rutgers.edu/OBIS) at Rutgers in 1998 to demonstrate the initial OBIS concept. An inaugural OBIS International Workshop was held on November 3–4, 1999 in Washington, DC, which led to scoping of the project and outreach to potential partners, with selected contributions published in a special issue of Oceanography magazine, within which OBIS founder Dr. J. F. Grassle articulated the vision of OBIS as "an on-line, worldwide atlas for accessing, modeling and mapping marine biological data in a multidimensional geographic context." In May 2000, US Government Agencies in the National Oceanographic Partnership Program together with the Alfred P. Sloan Foundation funded eight research projects to initiate OBIS. In May 2001, the US National Science Foundation funded Rutgers University to develop a global portal for OBIS. Also in 2001, an OBIS International Committee was formed and its first meeting was held in August 2001.

The production version of the OBIS Portal was launched at Rutgers University in 2002 as the web site http://www.iobis.org, serving 430,000 species-based georeferenced data records from 8 partner databases including fish records from FishBase, cephalopods from CephBase, corals from Biogeoinformatics of Hexacorals, mollusks from the Indo-Pacific Mollusc Database and more. By May 2006, the OBIS Portal was able to access 9.5 million records of 59,000 species from 112 databases, and by December 2010 (at the conclusion of the Census of Marine Life) provided access to 27.7 million records representing 167,000 taxon names. As at July 2018, the OBIS website states that the system provides access to over 45 million observations of nearly 120,000 marine species (the reduced number of names cited being as a result of synonym resolution, i.e. reduction of taxa recorded under multiple names to a single accepted name), based on contributions from 500 institutions from 56 countries.

In 2009 OBIS was adopted as a project by International Oceanographic Data and Information Exchange (IODE) programme of the Intergovernmental Oceanographic Commission (IOC) of UNESCO and in 2011, with the cessation of funding for the Rutgers-based secretariat and portal from the Sloan Foundation, an offer of hosting by the Flanders Marine Institute (VLIZ) in Ostend, Belgium was accepted to become the long term host for the system and also the OBIS secretariat moved from Rutgers University to the IOC Project Office for IODE in Ostend from where OBIS is presently maintained and additional development is carried out. The web address changed to . OBIS is thus now located in Ostend, in the same building which is also home to VLIZ. VLIZ maintains two taxonomic databases, the World Register of Marine Species and IRMNG, the Interim Register of Marine and Nonmarine Genera, both of which feed into taxonomic decisions used to control the display of species-based information in OBIS and also provide the taxonomic hierarchy via which OBIS content can be navigated. OBIS is currently under the direction of IODE with advice from a steering group, the IODE Steering Group for OBIS (SG-OBIS); operational activities are directed by an OBIS Executive Committee (OBIS-EC) with support from various OBIS Task Teams and ad-hoc OBIS project teams. The OBIS secretariat, hosted at the UNESCO/IOC project office for IODE in Ostend (Belgium), includes the OBIS project manager and data manager and in addition to maintaining the OBIS system also provides training and technical assistance to its data providers, guides new data standards and technical developments, and encourages international cooperation to foster the group benefits of the network.

Data available via OBIS cover all groups of organisms that have any association with marine or estuarine habitats, also including shorelines and the atmosphere above the ocean, such as marine vertebrates (fishes, marine mammals, turtles, seabirds, etc.); marine invertebrates (including zooplankton); marine bacteria; and marine plants (e.g. phytoplankton, seaweeds, mangroves).

== OBIS portal ==
As available web technologies have developed, the OBIS Portal has been through a number of iterations since its inception in 2002. Initially the system retrieved remote data in real time in response to a user query and used the KGS Mapper to visualize the results. In 2004, centralized metadata indexing and caching was introduced leading to faster and more reliable results, and the c-squares mapper was added to options for data visualization. In 2010, a full web GIS based system was introduced for the first time along with a new version of the web site which resulted in considerably more detailed and flexible presentation of search results along with a number of new search options. In April 2018, funding was announced to develop a new "2.0" version of OBIS with improved capabilities., and is released on 29 January 2019. The website URL changed from iobis.org to obis.org.

== Regional OBIS nodes ==
Over the period 2004–present, an international network of Regional OBIS Nodes has also been established, that are facilitating the connection of data sources in their region to the master OBIS data network and also increasingly provide specialised services or views of OBIS data to users in their particular region.

- Antarctic OBIS

Hosted by Belgian Biodiversity Platform, Brussels and by Flanders Marine Institute, Ostend. Managed by Bruno Danis

- Argentina

Hosted by Centro Nacional Patagonico - (CENPAT) - CONICET. Managed by Mirtha Lewis

- Australia

Hosted by Commonwealth Scientific and Industrial Research Organisation - Oceans and Atmosphere. Managed by Dave Watts

- Canada

Hosted by Centre of Marine Biodiversity and Bedford Institute of Oceanography. Managed by Bob Branton

- China

Hosted by Institute of Oceanology. Managed by Sun Xiaoxia

- Europe

Hosted by Vlaams Instituut voor de Zee. Managed by Ward Appeltans

- Indian Ocean

Hosted by National Chemical Laboratory and National Institute of Oceanography. Managed by Baba Ingole

- Japan

Hosted by National Institute for Environmental Studies. Managed by Junko Shimura

- New Zealand / South West Pacific

Hosted by National Institute of Water & Atmospheric Research. Managed by Don Robertson

- Sub-Saharan Africa

Hosted by Southern African Data Centre for Oceanography. Managed by Marten Grundlingh

- Philippines

Hosted by ASEAN Centre for Biodiversity. Managed by Christian Elloran

- Tropical and Subtropical Eastern South Pacific

Hosted by University of Concepcion. Managed by Ruben Escribando

- Tropical and Subtropical Western South Atlantic

Hosted by University of Sao Paulo (USP) and Reference Center on Environmental Information (CRIA. Managed by Fabio Lang Da Silvera

- United States of America

Hosted by National Oceanic and Atmospheric Administration (NOAA). Managed by Mat Biddle.

== See also ==
- Census of Marine Life
- World Register of Marine Species (WoRMS)

== Selected publications about OBIS ==
- Grassle, J.F. and Stocks, K.I., 1999. A Global Ocean Biogeographic Information System (OBIS) for the Census of Marine Life. Oceanography 12(3), pp. 12-14.
- Grassle, J.F. 2000. The Ocean Biogeographic Information System (OBIS): an on-line, worldwide atlas for accessing, modeling and mapping marine biological data in a multidimensional geographic context. Oceanography 13(3), pp. 5-7.
- Zhang, Y. and Grassle, J.F. 2003. A portal for the Ocean Biogeographic Information System. Oceanologica Acta 25(5), pp. 193-197.
- Mark J. Costello, J. Frederick Grassle, Yunqing Zhang, Karen Stocks, and Edward Vanden Berghe 2005. Where is what and what is where? Online mapping of marine species. MarBEF Newsletter. Spring 2005, pp. 20–22.
- Wood J.B., Zhang, P.Y., Costello, M.J. and Grassle, J.F. 2006. An introduction to OBIS, www.iobis.org. In: Miloslavich P. and Klein E. (eds), Caribbean marine biodiversity: the known and the unknown. DEStech Publications Inc., Lancaster Pennsylvania USA, pp. 253–254.
- Costello M.J., Stocks K., Zhang Y., Grassle J.F., Fautin D.G. 2007. About the Ocean Biogeographic Information System. Retrieved from http://hdl.handle.net/2292/5236
- Edward Vanden Berghe, Karen I. Stocks and J. Frederick Grassle. 2010. Data Integration: The Ocean Biogeographic Information System. Chapter 17 (pp. 333-353) in Alasdair D. McIntyre (ed.): Life in the World's Oceans. Blackwell Publishing Ltd. Chapter also available at http://www.comlmaps.org/mcintyre/ch17/data-integration-the-ocean-biogeographic-information-system.
- Vanden Berghe E, Halpin P, Lang da Silveira F, Stocks K and Grassle F. 2010. Integrating biological data into ocean observing systems: The future role of OBIS. In Hall J, Harrison D E, and Stammer D (eds) Proceedings of OceanObs'09: Sustained Ocean Observations and Information for Society (Volume 2). Paris, European Space Agency Publication No WPP-306.
- Costello M.J., Vanhoorne B., Appeltans W. 2015. Progressing conservation of biodiversity through taxonomy, data publication and collaborative infrastructures. Conservation Biology 29 (4), 1094–1099.
