= QDGC =

System of subdividing geographical cells

QDGC – quarter-degree grid cells (or QDS – quarter-degree squares) are a way of dividing the longitude and latitude degree square cells into smaller squares, forming in effect a system of geocodes. Historically QDGC has been used in a lot of African atlases. Several African biodiversity projects use QDGC, of which The Atlas of Southern African Birds is the most prominent. A 2009 paper by Larsen et al. describes the QDGC standard in detail.

== Mechanics ==
The squares themselves are based on the degree squares covering Earth. QDGC represents a way of making approximately equal area squares covering a specific area to represent specific qualities of the area covered. However, differences in area between "squares" increase with distance from the equator, and this can violate assumptions of many statistical analyses requiring truly equal-area grids. For instance species range modelling or estimates of ecological niche could be substantially affected if data were not appropriately transformed, e.g. projected onto a plane using a special projection.

Around the equator there are 360 degrees of longitude, and from the North Pole to the South Pole there are 180 degrees of latitude. Together this gives 64,800 degree squares covering Earth. The cells are closest to square near the equator and become narrower towards the poles. At the poles they are not square or even rectangular at all, but end up as elongated triangles.

Each degree square is designated by a full reference. E033S02 is a reference to a square in Tanzania. E means the square is east of the prime meridian (W is used for west), and the three digits that follow give the degree of longitude. S means it is south of the equator (N is used for north), and the last two digits give the degree of latitude.

A square with no sublevel reference is called QDGC level 0. This is a square of one full degree of longitude by one full degree of latitude. Each level 0 square is divided into four, where the upper left quadrant is designated A, the upper right B, the lower left C and the lower right D. This is QDGC level 1.

A	B
C	D

To get smaller squares, each of these squares is again divided into four, giving a total of 16 squares within a degree square. The squares at the new level are named the same way, by adding another letter at the end. The full reference of a level 2 square could then be:

- E033S02BB

The number of squares for each QDGC level can be calculated with this formula:

number of squares = (2^{d})^{2}

(where d is QDGC level)

Table showing level, number of squares and an example reference:

Level	Squares	Example
0	1	E033S02
1	4	E033S02B
2	16	E033S02BB
3	64	E033S02BBC
4	256	E033S02BBCD
5	1024	E033S02BBCDA
6	4096	E033S02BBCDAD

To decide which name a specific longitude latitude value belongs to it is possible to use the code provided on this GitHub project:

- QDGC on Github

Download shapefile datasets here:

- Countries
- Continents

== See also ==
- Geocode
- Digital orthophoto quadrangle
