= Marsden square =

System dividing part of a world map into a grid of 10°×10° cells

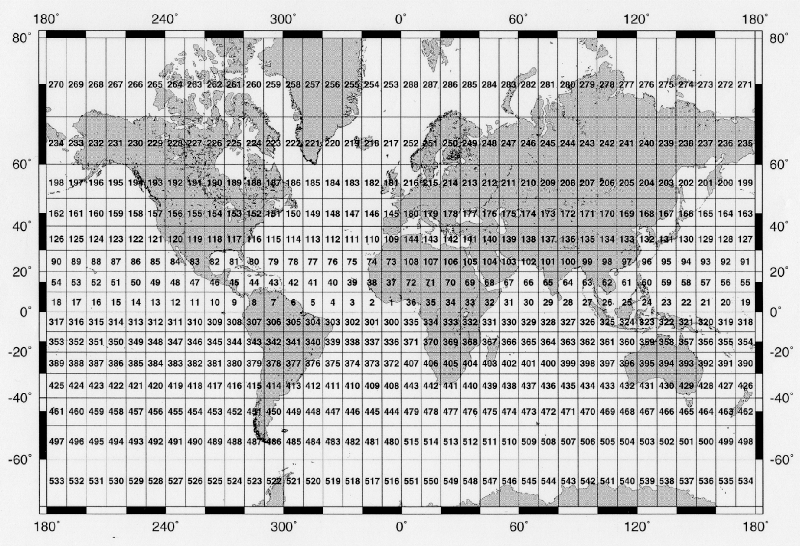
A Marsden Square map

Marsden square mapping or Marsden squares is a system that divides a world map with latitude-longitude gridlines (e.g. plate carrée projection, Mercator or other) between 80°N and 70°S latitudes (or 90°N and 80°S) into grid cells of 10° latitude by 10° longitude, each with a geocode, a unique numeric identifier. The method was devised by William Marsden (b. 1754, d. 1836), when first secretary of the British Admiralty, for collecting and combining geographically based information about the oceans.

== Structure and design ==
On the plate carrée projection the grid cells appear square, although if the Mercator projection is used, the grid cells appear "stretched" vertically nearer the tops and bottoms of the map. On the actual surface of the globe, the cells are approximately "square" only adjacent to the equator, and become progressively narrower and tapered (also with curved northern and southern boundaries) as they approach the poles, and cells adjoining the poles are unique in possessing three faces rather than four. Each of the 540 10°x10° squares is allocated a unique number from 1 to 288 and from 300 to 551 (see image to the right), plus the sequence extends to 936 in higher latitudes; individual squares can also be subdivided into 100 one-degree squares numbered from 00 to 99 in order to improve precision.

== Use ==
Marsden squares have mostly been used for identifying the geographic position of meteorological data, and are described further in various publications of the World Meteorological Organization (WMO). The 10°x10° square identifiers typically use a minimal number of characters (between 1 and 3 digits) which was/is an operational advantage for low bandwidth transmission systems.

However the rules for allocating numbers to squares do not follow a consistent pattern, so that reverse-engineering (decoding) the relevant square boundaries from any particular Marsden Square identifier is not particularly straightforward (a look-up table is probably the simplest in practice).

Slightly confusingly, an alternative (and more consistent), four-digit notation for global 10°x10° squares is actually known as World Meteorological Organization squares but does not seem to be actively promoted by the WMO itself.
