= J. Frederick Grassle =

American oceanographer and academic (1939–2018)

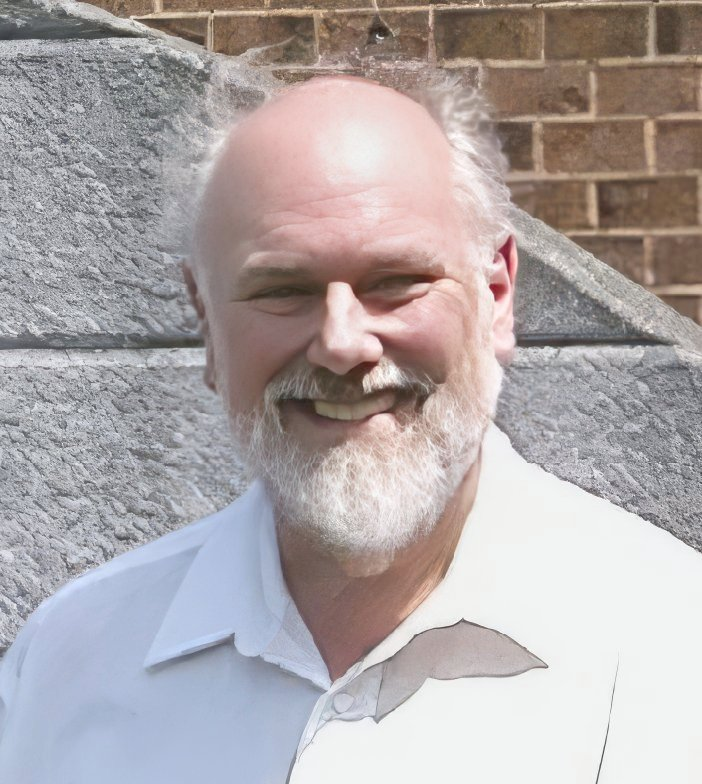
- Grassle in 2004
- Born: John Frederick Matthews Grassle; July 14, 1939; Cleveland, Ohio, U.S.
- Died: July 6, 2018 (aged 78); Franklin Township, New Jersey, U.S.
- Education: Yale University; Duke University
- Spouse: Judith Grassle
- Scientific career
- Fields: Oceanography, marine biology
- Workplaces: Woods Hole Oceanographic Institution; Rutgers University Institute of Marine and Coastal Studies (IMCS)

John Frederick Matthews ("Fred") Grassle (July 14, 1939 – July 6, 2018) was an American marine biologist, oceanographer, professor, and distinguished research scientist, notable for early work on the communities associated with deep-sea hydrothermal vents, and for his involvement in the creation of the Census of Marine Life and the first integration of marine biological data on a global scale, the Ocean Biogeographic Information System.

== Early life and education ==
Grassle was born in Cleveland, Ohio to parents John Kendall and Norah Iris (Fleck) Grassle. He graduated from Bay Village High School in 1957 and went on to study Zoology at Yale University, receiving his degree in 1961; his studies included a summer internship at the Woods Hole Oceanographic Institution (WHOI) which led to his lifelong interest in oceanography and marine biology. He then studied for his doctorate at Duke University, receiving his Ph.D. in 1967 for a study entitled "Influence of environmental variation on species diversity in benthic communities on the Continental shelf and slope". He received a Fulbright Fellowship which he took up at the University of Queensland in Australia, studying animal succession on the reef crest at Heron Island on the Great Barrier Reef.

== Career ==
In 1969, Grassle joined WHOI full time as an Assistant Scientist, working initially with Howard Sanders on deep-sea biodiversity. In 1977, he participated in the first biological expedition to survey the recently discovered hydrothermal vents at the Galapagos Rift, and contributed to the understanding of these unique ecosystems which are fueled by chemical energy from the Earth's interior rather than by sunlight. This expedition was documented in the National Geographic Society's documentary "Dive to the Edge of Creation". He remained with WHOI for 20 years, rising to the position of Senior Scientist, before moving to Rutgers University in New Jersey in 1989 where he would spend the remainder of his career.

In his position at Rutgers, Grassle served as founding director that university's then new (1987) Institute of Marine and Coastal Sciences (IMCS), where his work focused on near-shore continental shelf communities and the continued development of ocean observing systems, including an early cabled marine observing system deployed in 15 meters of water, the LEO-15 Long-term Ecosystem Observatory, that could be remotely monitored from Rutgers. He was best known for his deep-sea work, where he brought submersibles to the forefront as a sampling tool, brought experimental manipulative studies to the previously descriptive discipline of deep-sea benthic ecology, and generated debate in marine biodiversity with the first quantitative estimate of global deep-sea diversity. In 1996, he proposed the idea for a "Census of Marine Life" (initially entitled the "Census of the Fishes") to Jesse Ausubel of the Alfred P. Sloan Foundation and in 1997, hosted a "Census of the Benthos Workshop" at the Rutgers Institute of Marine and Coastal Sciences, part of a series initiated by Ausubel and the Foundation which eventually led to the formal commencement of the Census of Marine Life in 2000. He also conceived the first effort to integrate marine biological data on a global scale over the internet, the Ocean Biogeographic Information System (OBIS), which was adopted as the database for the Census, and continues to the present under the auspices of the Intergovernmental Oceanographic Commission. He served as the inaugural chair of the international Scientific Steering Committee for the Census of Marine Life from 2000–2008, as Director of the OBIS Secretariat while this was based at Rutgers up until 2011, and also on the Steering Committee of the U.S. Global Ocean Observing System from 2001-2006.

Grassle retired in 2012 after 23 years of service to Rutgers University; his career to 2009 was summarized in a paper by Paul Snelgrove et al. in the journal Deep-Sea Research. Following a period of poor health, Grassle died in his sleep at the Regency Jewish Heritage Nursing Center in Franklin Township, New Jersey, on July 6, 2018, aged 78. He was survived by his wife of 53 years, Judith (Judy) Grassle—also a colleague at IMCS and professor at Rutgers —and son John Thomas Grassle, as well as a sister, Norah Jean (Grassle) Bunts. On news of his death, Rich Lutz, a Rutgers Distinguished Professor and Grassle's successor as Director of IMCS, wrote: "... in the span of two short decades, [Fred] put together one of the finest marine science programs in the world. In recognition of [what he had] accomplished, Thomson Reuters in 2011 ranked Rutgers fourth in the world among oceanographic research programs". In the above cited paper by Snelgrove et al., the authors wrote in 2009: "[Fred's] most influential and widely-cited papers focus on the diversity of shallow-water and deep-sea systems, but his tireless advocacy for expanded research in marine biodiversity, improved ocean observation, and metadata cooperation have led to major new programs that extend from microbes to leviathans, and from intertidal regions to the oceanic abyss".

== Accomplishments and honors ==
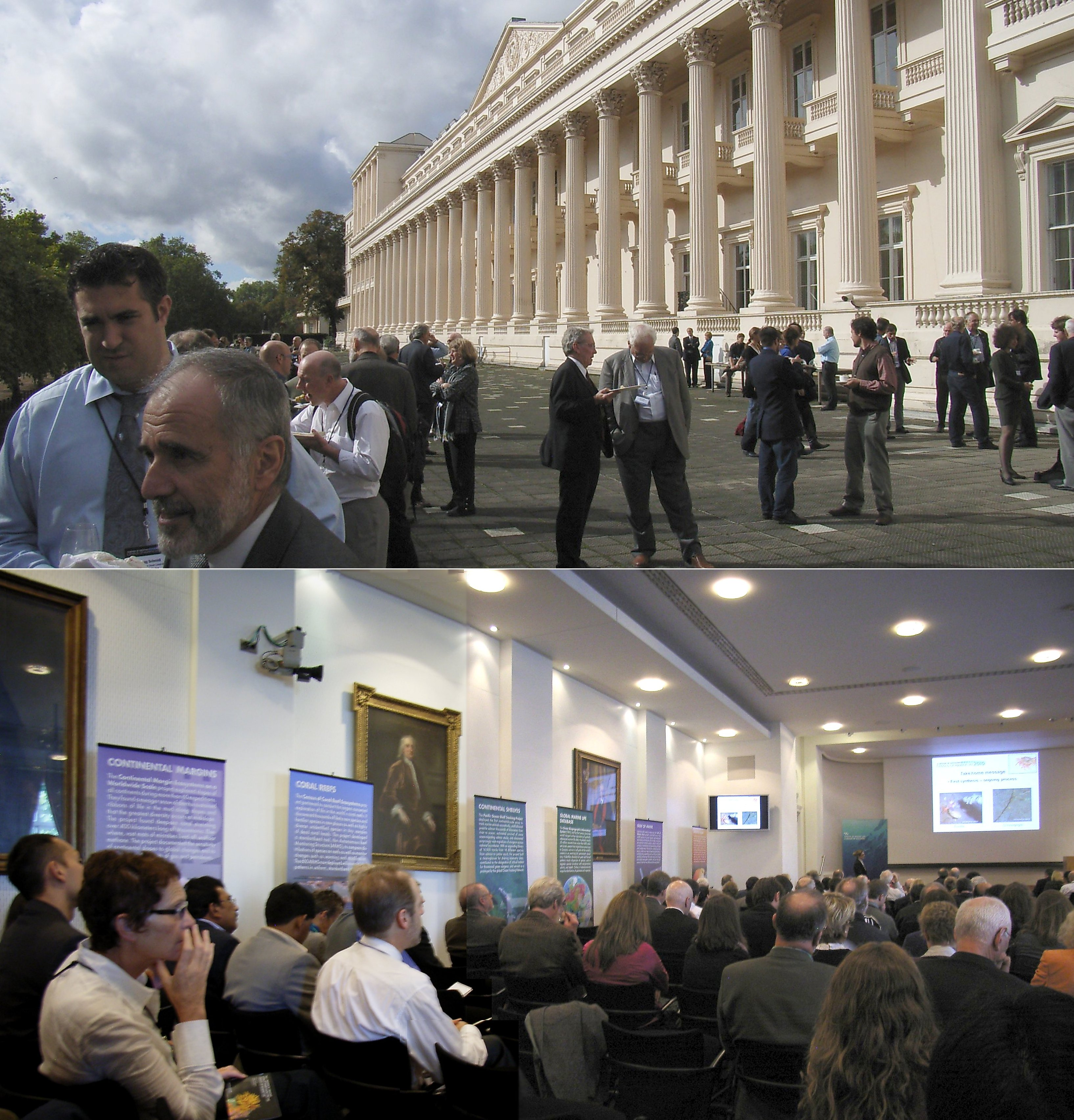
Delegates attend the J. Frederick Grassle Science Symposium on the Census of Marine Life at the Royal Society, London, 5‐6 October 2010

During his academic career Grassle authored over 80 scientific publications and was awarded many honors including the 2005 Grand Prix des Sciences de la Mer Albert 1er de Monaco, for "major contributions to the advancement of sciences throughout the world", the 2009 Benjamin Franklin Medal, the American Society of Limnology and Oceanography A.C. Redfield Lifetime Achievement Award (2011) and the 2013 Japan Prize. Between 1994 and 2002, he was president of the International Association for Biological Oceanography (IABO). He was a member of the Committee on Biological Diversity in Marine Systems which in 1995 produced a report entitled "Understanding marine biodiversity: a research agenda for the nation". He was a founder member and the initial chair (1999-2008) of the Scientific Steering Committee of the Census of Marine Life, which in 2010 named its summing-up science symposium after him; this Committee also received the 2011 International Cosmos Prize in recognition of its decade of international ocean research spanning multiple scientific disciplines. He has had six species and one genus of polychaetes, three species of mollusks, and three species of crustaceans named after him.
