= Flanders Marine Institute =

Belgian research institute

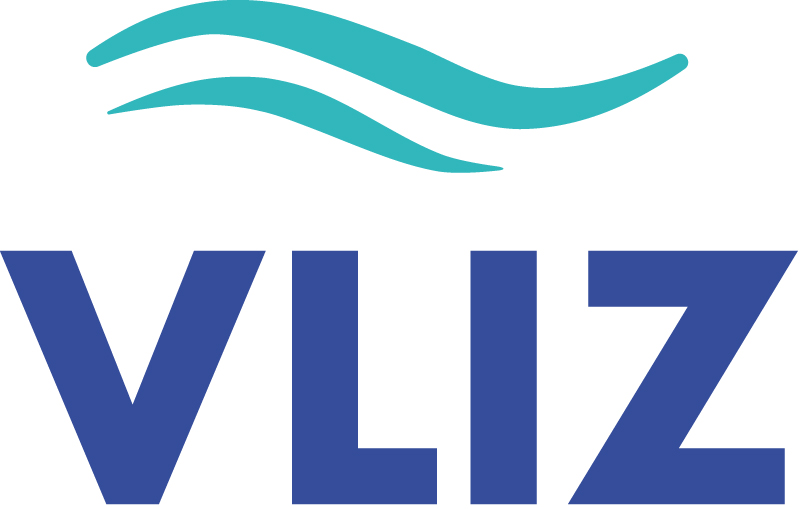
- Formation: 1999; 27 years ago
- Type: Non-Profit Organization
- Purpose: Support marine research
- Location: Jacobsenstraat 1, Ostend, Belgium
- Key people: Jan Mees (General Director)
- Website: www.vliz.be

The Flanders Marine Institute (Dutch: Vlaams Instituut voor de Zee, VLIZ) is a scientific institution dedicated to marine research. Established in 1999 and headquartered in Ostend, Flanders, VLIZ gathers and disseminates ocean knowledge, promotes marine sciences, supports policy-making, fosters innovative solutions, and manages marine data. The institute collaborates closely with scientific institutions, governments, and industry at both national and international levels.

== Mission and objectives ==
VLIZ's mission is to advance scientific knowledge of marine ecosystems. Its scope covers global seas and estuaries, with a specific focus on the Southern North Sea and the Flemish coast. The institute ensures this knowledge is widely accessible to support the sustainable management of marine resources. VLIZ collects, analyzes, and shares marine data, supporting both scientific research and marine policy. The institute explores innovative pathways, such as developing monitoring systems and marine robotics. Its motto aptly reflects this mission: "VLIZ, pioneer in marine knowledge."

== Research domains ==
VLIZ conducts multidisciplinary research with significant societal relevance and impact. Its research adheres to the principles of Open Science and emphasizes collaboration. The Climate-Ocean-Biodiversity nexus is central to VLIZ's research, focusing on two thematic pillars: Ocean and Human Health and Climate Change in Shallow Coastal Zones. Key research areas include:

- Marine biodiversity: Investigating the diversity of marine life, from invertebrates to fish, seabirds, and marine mammals.
- Marine ecosystems: Studying the structural and functional dynamics of marine ecosystems, including the impact of human activities such as underwater noise, pollution, fishing, and shipping.
- Climate change and coastal management: Assessing the effects of climate change on global seas, with a particular focus on shallow coastal areas.
- Marine technology: Developing innovative technologies for marine research, including sensors, monitoring systems, and robotics.

== Infrastructure and data ==
VLIZ manages several key databases, including the World Register of Marine Species (WoRMS), an authoritative repository of taxonomic information on all marine species worldwide. This database, maintained by an international network of taxonomists, is globally recognized as a standard for marine biodiversity.

The institute provides access to marine data through platforms like EMODnet (European Marine Observation and Data Network). VLIZ operates advanced research infrastructure, including the research vessel Simon Stevin, the workboat Abbé Mann, and a fleet of marine robots. These resources are vital for conducting fieldwork and data collection in the Belgian North Sea and beyond.

== Public engagement ==
In addition to research, VLIZ actively engages a broad range of stakeholders, including scientists, policymakers, businesses, governments, educators, and the general public. The institute offers training opportunities, internships, and collaboration programs with universities and research institutions. VLIZ also raises awareness about marine and climate issues through public events and educational initiatives.

== International collaboration ==
VLIZ collaborates with various national and international organizations and institutions. It is a key player in international networks focused on marine sciences, providing expertise in marine data use, technology development, and knowledge sharing.

== Location ==
VLIZ's headquarters are located at Jacobsenstraat 1, on the Oosteroever in Ostend, within the InnovOcean Campus. This building is shared with the marine division of the Institute for Agricultural, Fisheries, and Food Research (ILVO), as well as several partners affiliated with VLIZ, including the IOC Project Office for IODE, the European Marine Board Secretariat, the EMODnet Secretariat, the Kusterfgoed heritage cell, and the Coastal Regional Office of the Province of West Flanders. The facility offers extensive meeting spaces and serves as the base for VLIZ's scientific and technical activities.

Additionally, VLIZ manages the Marine Station Ostend (MSO) at Slipwaykaai in the Ostend harbor. This complex includes laboratories, a testing center for marine robots (the Marine Robotics Centre), and various technical workspaces. Researchers, students, and technicians collaborate here on diverse projects, ranging from biological experiments to maritime archaeological studies.
