= Type locality (biology) =

Place where a name-bearing type specimen was collected

A type locality is the place where the name-bearing type specimen – the particular specimen that formally anchors the scientific name – of a species or subspecies was collected, captured, or first observed. In zoology, the term is formally defined by the International Code of Zoological Nomenclature (ICZN), which ties the type locality directly to the provenance of the name-bearing type rather than to the species' overall distribution. In botany (including algae and fungi), the collecting place of the type is usually discussed as the locus classicus ("classical locality"), even though the International Code of Nomenclature for algae, fungi, and plants (ICN) regulates typification by specimens rather than defining "type locality" as a standalone term.

A type locality can be effectively changed when a later author selects a single specimen from the original set as the lectotype, or designates a replacement specimen (a neotype) when all original material has been lost, because the Code then ties the type locality to the provenance of that newly fixed specimen. Disagreements may arise when later authors "restrict" vague historical localities without a formal typification act. Because many older localities were recorded only as narrative descriptions, modern practice often involves georeferencing: assigning coordinates and an explicit uncertainty estimate, and documenting how that interpretation was made. In biodiversity informatics, type-locality data are typically expressed through standard specimen and location fields (for example in Darwin Core) rather than through a single "type locality" field, and the concept is used in applied work ranging from taxonomic revision and DNA sequencing of topotypic material (specimens collected from the type locality) to discussions of conservation significance for sites where endemic species were first documented.

== Definition and scope ==
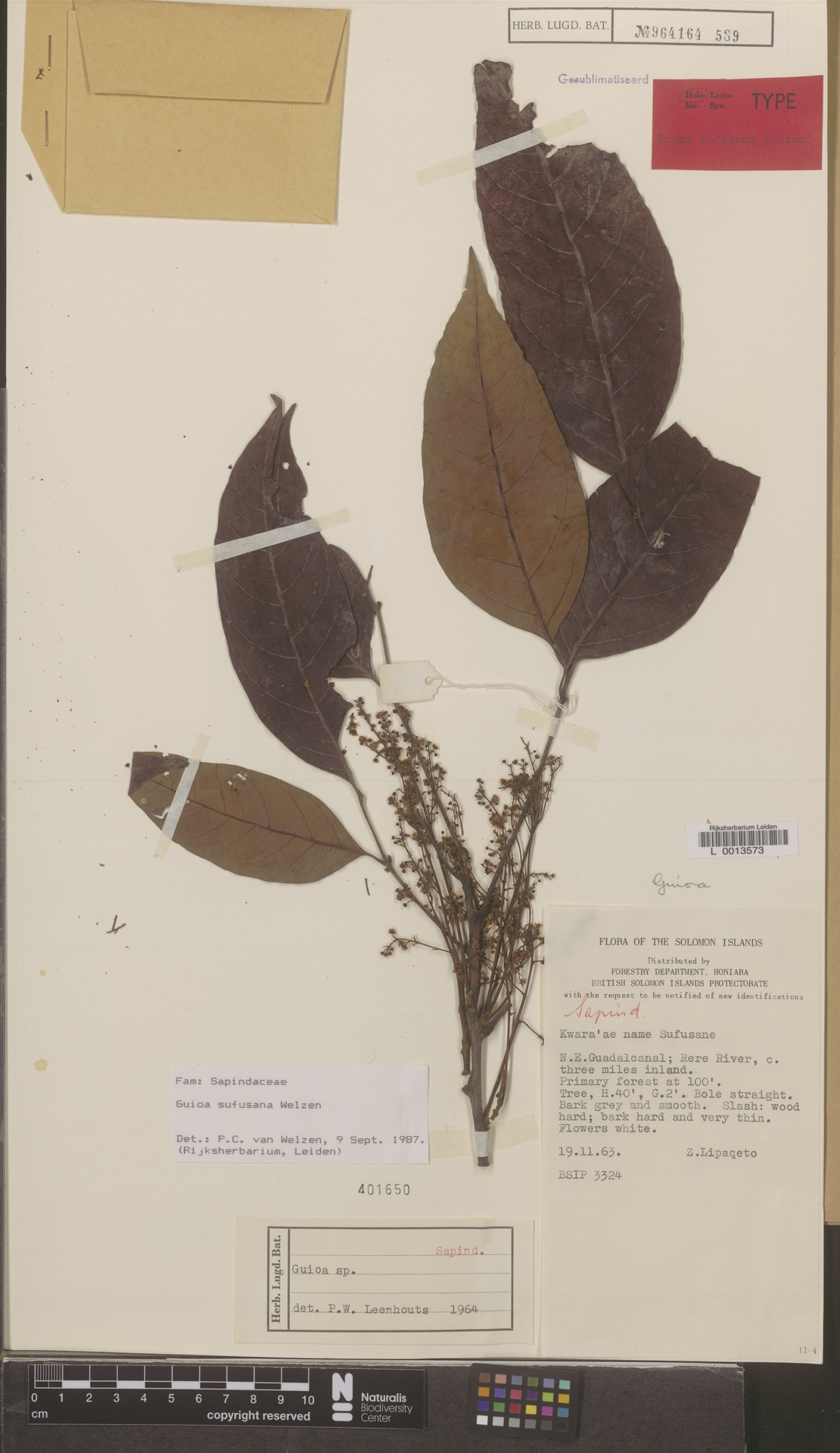
Holotype herbarium sheet of Guioa sufusana (L 0013573), with label data recording the collection locality

Under the ICZN, the type locality of a nominal species-group taxon (that is, a species or subspecies as formally named under the Code) is the geographical (and, where relevant, stratigraphical) place of capture, collection, or observation of the name-bearing type. If a species-group name was established on syntypes (multiple specimens that collectively served as the basis for the name, none of them singled out as a unique standard) and no lectotype has been designated, the type locality encompasses the localities of all syntypes. The definition therefore ties the concept directly to a specimen (or set of specimens) rather than to an author's abstract idea of "where the species lives", and it should not be read as describing a species' overall distribution or the centre of its range. A key edge-case provision addresses specimens that were transported by artificial means before being collected: the ICZN specifies that in such cases the type locality is the place from which the name-bearing type, or its wild progenitor, began its unnatural journey. This prevents accidental locations – such as a metropolitan zoo or a port of entry – from being erroneously designated as the type locality for a species that originated in the wild. For fossil taxa, type-locality usage is commonly treated as including the stratigraphical horizon associated with the name-bearing material, as well as its geographic origin.

In botany, the ICN governs the naming of algae, fungi, and plants and focuses primarily on the typification of names by specimens (or illustrations) rather than by geographical places. Locality information for the type is typically recorded in the protologue (everything published as part of the original description of the name, including text, illustrations, and specimen citations) and in herbarium label data, and it is often discussed in practice even where it is not regulated as a defined ICN term. Although the ICN does not formally define "type locality" as a regulated term, the collecting locality of the holotype or other original material is routinely referred to by botanists as the locus classicus and carries equivalent practical importance.

In prokaryote nomenclature, governed by the International Code of Nomenclature of Prokaryotes (ICNP), a species name is fixed by a living reference culture, the type strain (a particular isolate maintained in culture collections that serves as the permanent reference point for the name), rather than by a preserved specimen. For names validly published since 2001, the ICNP requires that a viable culture of the type strain be deposited in at least two publicly accessible culture collections in different countries, so that the reference material can be examined and obtained by other researchers. In this context, "type locality" is used mainly as provenance information for the type strain: many descriptions report where the type strain was isolated (often giving coordinates and habitat) and may label that site as the type locality, even though the Code's binding reference point is the strain itself. Related ideas such as collecting material "from the type locality" are therefore practical descriptors in microbiology rather than formal nomenclatural categories, and their interpretation can be less standardised than in specimen-based codes.

In virus taxonomy, overseen by the International Committee on Taxonomy of Viruses (ICTV), species are typically linked to an exemplar virus isolate represented by genome sequence data, rather than to a preserved name-bearing specimen. For new species, ICTV taxonomic proposals are expected to provide GenBank accession numbers for an exemplar isolate, and ICTV resources compile exemplar-linked information for each recognised species. In practice, some ICTV materials also refer to a single "type isolate" for a species, usually chosen as the best-sequenced or best-documented isolate, and the place and circumstances of isolation (often recorded in sequence databases as country/region and sometimes coordinates) provide the closest functional analogue to a "type locality". This locality information is contextual provenance for the exemplar or type isolate, however, rather than a formal, name-fixing concept comparable to type locality under specimen-based codes.

== Relationship to name-bearing types ==
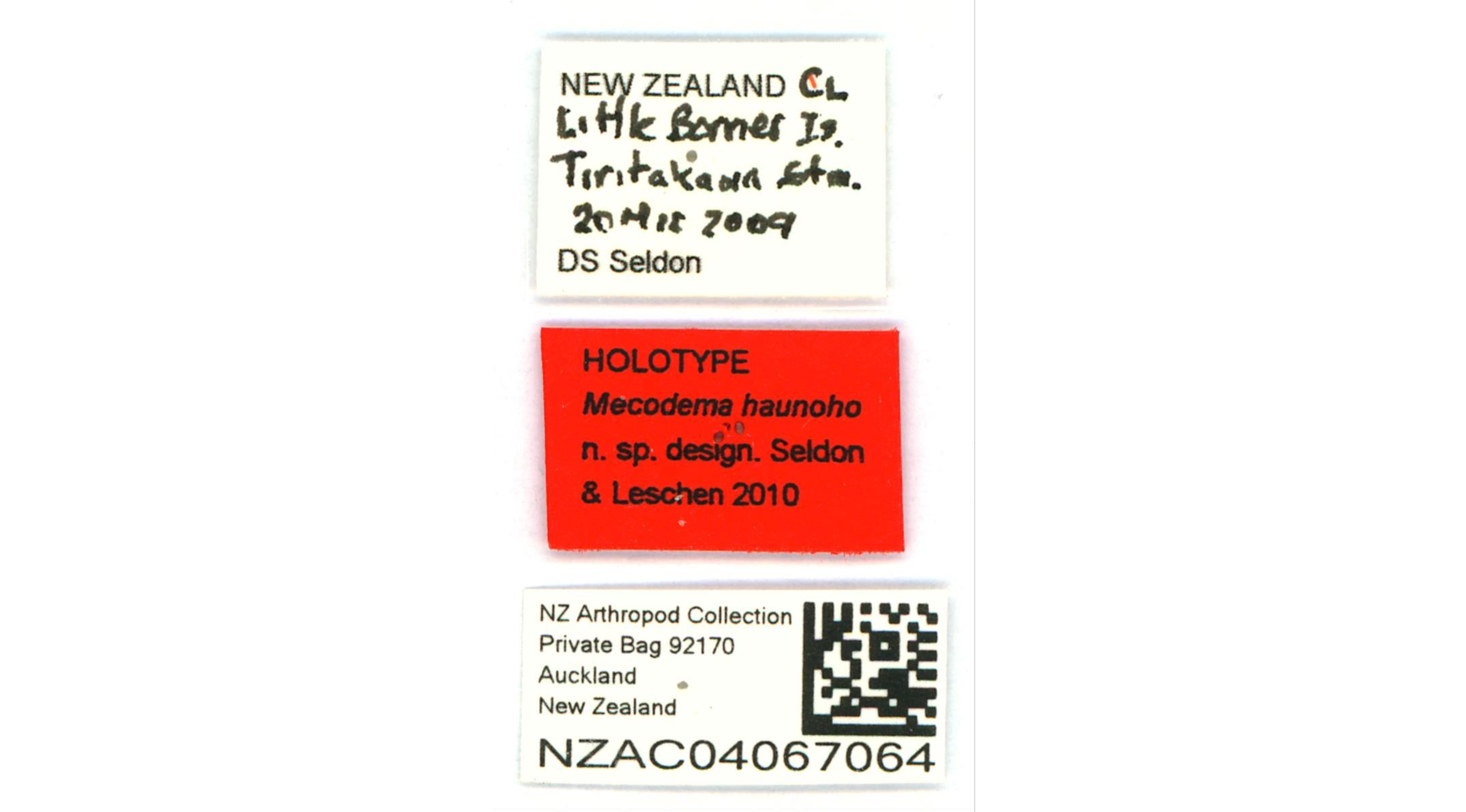
Close-up of the specimen labels for the holotype of Mecodema haunoho, illustrating how type-locality data are documented on museum material

The type locality is derived from the identity of the name-bearing type and follows whichever specimen(s) the relevant code treats as the objective bearer of the name, rather than being an independently chosen geographical feature. It therefore does not necessarily correspond to "where the species really comes from" in a broader distributional sense, and it should not be read as a summary of a species' overall range or typical occurrence.

In the simplest zoological case, a single specimen was designated (or indicated) in the original description as the holotype, and its place of collection defines the type locality. When no holotype was designated and the original description was based on multiple specimens (syntypes), the type locality encompasses the localities of all those syntypes collectively, and this can include more than one geographic place (and, where relevant, more than one stratigraphical context) until a lectotype is selected from among them. Once a lectotype has been designated, the type locality is fixed to the place of origin of that lectotype, because the lectotype then functions as the name-bearing type for the nominal taxon.

Other specimens cited in the original description but not forming part of the name-bearing type – paratypes in zoological terminology – do not determine the type locality. They often share locality context with the holotype and can be useful for understanding the original author's concept of the species, but they have no nomenclatural bearing on which place is formally the type locality. Where a holotype was designated, the ICZN treats the remaining specimens of the type series (the full set of specimens on which the original author based the new species) as paratypes and specifies that they do not become syntypes and cannot be used for lectotype selection if the holotype is lost or destroyed, although they may still be considered in any later neotype action taken under the Code's neotype provisions.

If the original name-bearing type material is lost or destroyed and a neotype is later designated to serve as the name-bearing type, the type locality is correspondingly tied to the place of origin of the neotype, because the ICZN defines type locality by direct reference to the name-bearing type. Specimens collected from the type locality ("topotypes" in common usage) can be valuable in later revisionary and comparative work, but they have no formal nomenclatural status unless one is designated as a name-bearing type under the relevant rules.

In botany, the type of a species name is typically a single herbarium specimen (the holotype) or, for older names published without a designated holotype, the set of original material (the specimens and illustrations that the original author associated with the name) from which a lectotype may later be chosen. The ICN uses the term isotype for a duplicate of the holotype (i.e. part of the same gathering), which by definition comes from the same locality. If a holotype is missing or destroyed, an isotype (as original material) may be selected as the lectotype, thereby fixing the application of the name to that specimen and its associated locality information in practice.

== How type locality can change or be fixed later ==
Although the type locality is initially determined by the provenance of the original name-bearing type, subsequent nomenclatural acts can change it. The most consequential changes occur when the identity of the name-bearing type is later fixed by a lectotype or neotype designation, because the ICZN then assigns the type locality to the place of origin of that later-fixed name-bearing type. Older original descriptions may also give vague, broad, or historically framed locality statements, and later authors may try to make these interpretable as an actual place that can be located and revisited.

=== Clarifying or correcting a stated type locality ===
The ICZN recommends that an erroneous statement of type locality should be corrected. In ascertaining or clarifying a type locality, the Code points to evidence such as data accompanying the original material, collectors' notes or itineraries, and the original description, and it treats inference from localities within the known range of the taxon (or from which specimens referred to the taxon have been taken) as a last resort.

=== Lectotype fixes the type locality ===
When a nominal species was originally based on syntypes from two or more localities and no holotype was designated, a later author may select one of those syntypes as the lectotype. Under ICZN Article 76.2, the place of origin of the lectotype then becomes the type locality "despite any previously published statement of the type locality". This is why older taxonomic literature can appear to give a different type locality from the one currently accepted: the designation of a lectotype may have changed it since publication of the original description.

In botany, a lectotype is likewise selected from among the original material when no holotype exists or the holotype has been lost; ICN Article 9.3 provides that the selected element must not be in serious conflict with the protologue (the text and illustrations associated with the original publication of the name).

=== Neotype fixes the type locality ===
When all original type material of a nominal species has been lost or destroyed, a neotype may be designated under strict conditions. Under ICZN Article 76.3, the place of origin of the neotype becomes the type locality, again "despite any previously published statement". The ICZN (Article 75.3) requires that a neotype be designated only when there is an exceptional need to clarify the taxonomic identity of the species, and recommends that the neotype should come, if possible, from as near as practicable to the original type locality.

In botany, a neotype may be selected under ICN Article 9.13 when no original material survives; a lectotype always takes precedence over a neotype whenever one can be designated.

=== "Terra typica restricta" and invalid restrictions ===
A common practice in zoological taxonomy is for a later author to publish a "restriction" of the type locality - often expressed with the Latin phrase terra typica restricta - to narrow a vague or broad original locality statement to a specific site. Dubois has argued that many such published "restrictions" are nomenclaturally empty if they are not backed by a valid typification act (i.e. lectotype or neotype designation), because the ICZN's mechanism for changing the type locality operates through the designation of a name-bearing type, not through bare assertion. Under Articles 76.2 and 76.3 of the ICZN, only the designation of a lectotype or neotype formally fixes a new type locality; a statement that merely declares the type locality to be restricted to a particular site, without designating a type specimen from that site, does not by itself change the type locality under the Code.

== Terminology and Latin phrases ==
Several Latin and Latin-derived terms appear frequently in the taxonomic literature in connection with the type locality. The phrase locus typicus (literally "typical place") is a Latin equivalent of "type locality" widely used in zoological publications, especially in European-language literature. In botany, the preferred Latin term is locus classicus (literally "classical place"), denoting the collecting locality of the type specimen or original material of a plant name. The plural form loci classici is also used in botanical literature when discussing multiple such localities. Otero, Fernández-Mazuecos, and Vargas, in a phylogenomic study of Antirrhinum, defined the locus classicus as the locality where plants were originally collected and studied for the description of a new species.

The expression terra typica (literally "typical land") is encountered in older zoological literature, particularly German-language works, as a synonym for type locality. The related phrase terra typica restricta denotes a type locality that has been narrowed from a broader originally cited range (see above).

A topotype is a specimen originating from the type locality of the species or subspecies to which it is thought to belong, whether or not it was part of the original type series; the adjective topotypic describes such material. The ICZN Glossary treats the term as not regulated by the Code, and it is used in modern guidance on zoological species descriptions as a practical descriptor rather than a formal type category. In this sense, terms such as "topotype" describe provenance, whereas terms such as holotype, lectotype, and neotype refer to nomenclaturally defined, name-bearing types designated under formal rules. Topotypic specimens are valued in practice because they come from the same site as the name-bearing type and are therefore more likely to be conspecific (belonging to the same species) with it; they are particularly useful for molecular studies in which destructive sampling of irreplaceable type specimens is undesirable.

The term type horizon (or type stratum) denotes the geological stratum from which the name-bearing type of a nominal species was collected, and is used principally in palaeontology. The ICZN Glossary also defines related contextual terms such as type host (the host species associated with the name-bearing type).

== Reporting type locality in original descriptions ==
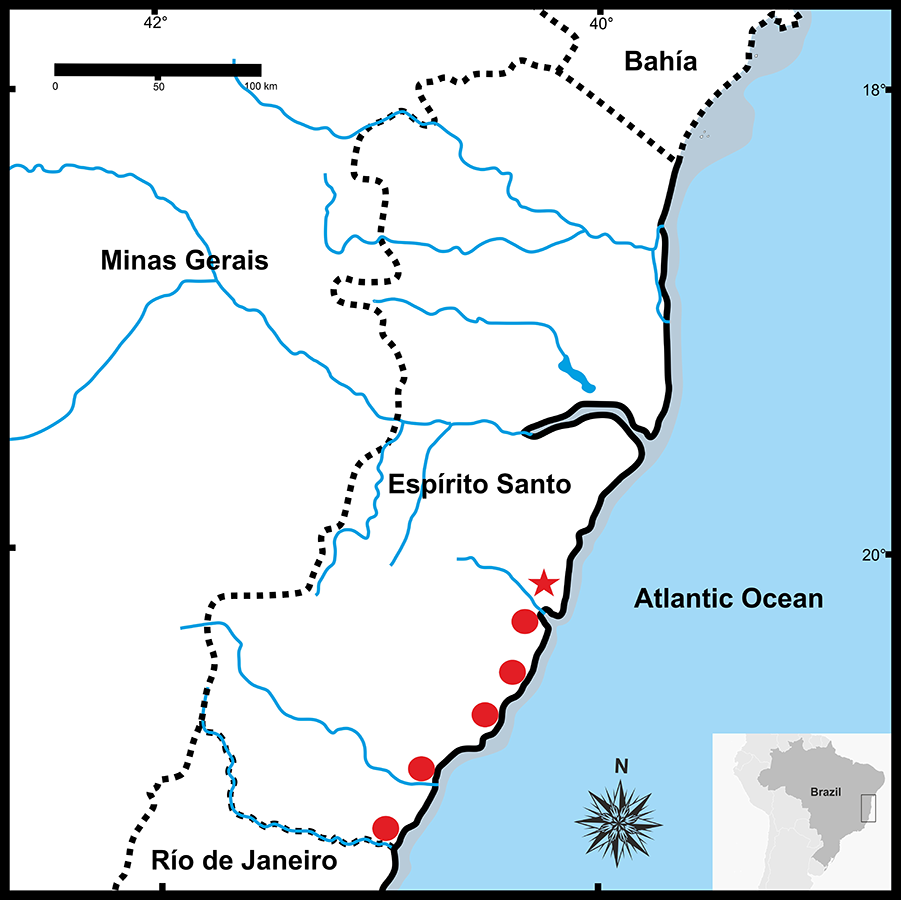
Geographic distribution of the Brazilian frog species Pseudopaludicola restinga. The star indicates the type locality.

When describing a new species, authors are expected to state the type locality clearly and precisely. Braby, Hsu, and Lamas, in a review of best practice for species descriptions in zoology, identified the failure to provide adequate locality data among the common mistakes made in recent taxonomic publications. The ICZN does not mandate a particular format, but Recommendation 76A encourages publication of the full locality for the holotype (including geographic coordinates) together with associated label data such as the collecting date and other information accompanying the specimen, and it advises that modern place-name equivalents should be provided where historical names have changed. Depending on the organism, the Code also points to contextual information that may be relevant for interpreting the type locality, including elevation for terrestrial taxa, depth for aquatic taxa, host species for parasites, and geological age and stratigraphic position for fossil taxa. Best-practice guidance commonly also records where the name-bearing type is deposited and gives its unique catalogue or registration number so that the specimen can be unambiguously matched to museum records. In one set of mammalogy best-practice recommendations, authors advised explicitly designating the type locality and providing geographic coordinates for it, while keeping it distinct from the localities of other cited specimens where relevant.

In botany, the ICN requires that a holotype be indicated and that its place of deposition (the herbarium where it is held) be specified; the collecting locality, while not a formal requirement for valid publication (the ICN's term for a name that meets all procedural requirements to be formally established) under the ICN, is almost always included in the protologue and is essential for subsequent taxonomic work. In applied curation guidance, the protologue is defined broadly as everything associated with a name at its first publication, including geographic data, and the typification statement is described as indicating which collections are types, when and where they were collected, and where they are preserved.

Modern best practice encourages authors to provide geographic coordinates (latitude and longitude), an estimate of coordinate uncertainty, the geodetic datum used, and a verbal description of the locality. Providing this information at the time of description reduces downstream problems when later researchers attempt to georeference vague historical locality statements.

=== Sensitive locality data ===
Some biodiversity-data guidance treats fine-scale locality information as sensitive when its public release could facilitate poaching, illegal trade, or other disturbance of rare, threatened, or commercially valuable taxa. Work on museum and field records has described a tension between the scientific value of detailed locality documentation and the risk that published localities can be used to exploit vulnerable organisms, framing this as a dual-use problem (where the same data serve both legitimate research and potential misuse) for natural history data. Studies of wildlife trade and the economics of rarity likewise note that newly reported taxa can attract collectors once their existence and locations become widely visible, and that some institutions and communities respond by limiting public disclosure of precise site information (for example by avoiding publicly distributed maps for particularly sensitive occurrences).

Recommended approaches include publishing a broader verbal locality, rounding or generalizing coordinates, or withholding exact coordinates from public datasets while retaining the full information in restricted records that can be released under defined conditions (for example to accredited researchers or management authorities). Analyses of "cloaked" or "obscured" occurrence records in aggregation and citizen-science platforms describe these measures as attempts to prevent misuse of location data for threatened species, while also noting that reduced spatial precision can affect downstream research and may require practical ways for legitimate researchers to access the full-precision data. In practice, taxonomic papers sometimes state explicitly that coordinates for type material or other voucher records have been withheld or omitted for conservation reasons (including discouraging poaching), with the full locality information available on request from the authors or custodians of the specimens.

== Common problems and sources of error ==
Type localities as originally published may be vague, erroneous, or difficult to interpret for a variety of reasons.

=== Ambiguous or obsolete place names ===
Vagueness is a widespread problem in older literature, where the type locality may be stated only as a country or large region (e.g. "India" or "South America") without further precision. Specimen labels and protologues may also describe places only by relative directions and distances (e.g. "10 miles NW of X") or by administrative units whose names and boundaries have changed, making later interpretation dependent on contextual reconstruction rather than simple place-name matching. Historical place names may have changed or become obsolete, requiring research into the original collector's notes and itineraries to determine the modern equivalent. The ICZN explicitly recommends (Recommendation 76A) that in ascertaining or clarifying a type locality, an author should take into account data accompanying the original material, the collector's notes and itineraries, the original description of the taxon, and – as a last resort – localities within the known range of the taxon. Because later georeferencing often involves converting such narrative statements into coordinates, poorly supported georeferences can mislead subsequent work, and biodiversity informatics guidance has warned that "to georeference poorly is worse than not to georeference at all".

=== Mislabelled or erroneous localities ===
Erroneous type localities can arise from mislabelling of specimens, confusion of collecting events, or deliberate falsification. Errors can also result from typographical mistakes or mismatched specimen numbers that associate a name with the wrong physical specimen or collecting event, which can in turn misstate both the identity of the holotype and the type locality. The ICZN recommends (Recommendation 76A.2) that a type locality statement found to be erroneous should be corrected. Such corrections are routinely published in taxonomic journals; the correcting author typically provides evidence from collectors' itineraries, label data, or distributional knowledge to demonstrate the error and propose the corrected locality. For example, Motta and co-authors published a formal correction of both the holotype identity and the type locality for Dendrobates duellmani, illustrating how provenance problems can require revision of the published locality statement when the underlying type material is clarified.

=== Captive or transported specimens ===
The ICZN's provision that the type locality is the place from which the name-bearing type (or its wild progenitor) began its "unnatural journey" exists to prevent absurd situations - for example, a type locality being recorded as a European zoo or port for an organism whose natural habitat is in the tropics. The clause (ICZN Article 76.1.1) ensures that the type locality reflects the species' natural range rather than the accident of where it was intercepted or deposited after transport. Comparable provenance problems can also arise outside zoology when organisms are described from cultivated or otherwise transported material, where the published collection context may not straightforwardly reflect wild origin and later historical work may be needed to reconstruct it.

== Georeferencing and data standards ==
=== Why georeference type localities ===
Many type localities recorded in older taxonomic literature exist only as textual descriptions without geographic coordinates. Georeferencing - the process of assigning coordinates and spatial uncertainty to such descriptions - enables these records to be integrated into geographic information systems (GIS) and global biodiversity databases. The Global Biodiversity Information Facility (GBIF) has published best-practice guidance emphasising that georeferencing should be done carefully, because poorly georeferenced data can be worse than data with no coordinates at all if the assigned coordinates are misleading. The same guidance emphasises that georeferences should be documented in a way that can be checked and reproduced, and recommends retaining georeferencing metadata and recording sources so that later revisions can be traced.

=== Uncertainty and the point-radius method ===
The point-radius method, described by Wieczorek, Guo, and Hijmans, represents each georeferenced locality as a single set of coordinates (the point, treated as the centre of the described area) together with a radius in metres that defines a circle large enough to encompass the full area consistent with the locality description and its associated uncertainties. This method accounts for the precision and specificity of the locality description, the scale and accuracy of the coordinate source, and the geodetic datum (the reference framework that defines how coordinates map onto the Earth's surface). A core principle of georeferencing is that coordinates alone do not unambiguously define a collecting location, because collection events have spatial extent and must be interpreted as an estimate accompanied by uncertainty rather than as an exact point. It was developed in the context of natural history collections, where millions of specimens have textual locality descriptions but lack coordinates, and is recommended by GBIF as a standard approach for georeferencing. Where coordinates are reported, the datum should be specified (for example, WGS84) so that coordinates can be interpreted consistently across datasets.

=== Where type-locality information lives in biodiversity informatics ===
Locality data for type specimens are captured using standard vocabularies and shared through biodiversity data networks. The Darwin Core standard, maintained by Biodiversity Information Standards (TDWG), provides the principal vocabulary for recording location information associated with biological specimens and observations. Darwin Core is designed to preserve both the original locality wording and later interpretation: dwc:verbatimLocality records the locality text as it appears on the original label or in the source record, while dwc:locality records a standardized locality description used for indexing and exchange. Relevant Darwin Core terms – each a standardised field name used in shared databases – include dwc:decimalLatitude and dwc:decimalLongitude (geographic coordinates in decimal degrees), dwc:geodeticDatum (the spatial reference system), and dwc:typeStatus (the nomenclatural status of the specimen, such as "holotype" or "lectotype").

Darwin Core defines dwc:coordinateUncertaintyInMeters as the horizontal distance from the given latitude and longitude describing the smallest circle containing the whole location, and advises that the value should be left empty if uncertainty is unknown or cannot be estimated (with zero not treated as a valid placeholder). The vocabulary also provides terms for recording georeferencing provenance, including dwc:georeferencedBy (who assigned the coordinates), dwc:georeferenceProtocol (the method used), and dwc:georeferenceSources (the resources consulted). There is no dedicated "typeLocality" field in Darwin Core; instead, type-locality information is captured through the combination of standard location terms and specimen-level metadata indicating that the record represents a name-bearing type, and some datasets also link the type record to the relevant name using terms such as dwc:typifiedName. GBIF’s georeferencing guidance includes discussion of mapping georeferencing concepts into Darwin Core terms, reflecting the intended use of these fields in shared biodiversity occurrence datasets.

== Use in taxonomy, ecology, and conservation ==
Type localities play a practical role in several areas of biological research. In taxonomy, they provide the geographical anchor for species names: when a species is suspected to represent a complex of cryptic species (species that are morphologically very similar or indistinguishable but genetically distinct), revisiting the type locality to collect topotypic specimens can help resolve which population corresponds to the original name. Otero, Fernández-Mazuecos, and Vargas demonstrated this approach in a phylogenomic study of Antirrhinum (snapdragons), in which they deliberately sampled topotypic material from the locus classicus of each species to test whether named taxa corresponded to phylogenetically distinct lineages. In integrative taxonomy more broadly, topotypic material is sometimes analysed alongside museum type material in combined morphological and molecular datasets, helping to relate modern sequence-based results to historically described names without destructive sampling of irreplaceable name-bearing types. The stabilising intent of this practice is reflected in nomenclatural rules for replacement types, since the ICZN recommends that a neotype should come, where practicable, from as near as possible to the original type locality.

In conservation biology, the type localities of endemic species have been recognised as sites of potential conservation significance. Brundu and colleagues mapped the loci classici of all Italian endemic vascular plant species and found that many were concentrated in areas of high botanical diversity, but that a substantial proportion fell outside existing protected areas. They argued that type localities represent an intersection of cultural and natural heritage, because they are both scientifically important reference sites and often harbour the populations from which species were first described. At the same time, they treated type localities as point reference data and not as a proxy for a species' full geographic distribution, noting that conservation assessments require additional occurrence data beyond the locus classicus.

== Examples ==
The following examples illustrate how type-locality concepts and problems discussed above play out in published taxonomic practice. In 2025, Motta and colleagues published a correction in Zootaxa for the poison dart frog species Dendrobates duellmani Schulte, 1999. When the species was originally described, the author had worked from a published photograph rather than from the physical specimen itself; the catalogue number communicated for the holotype turned out to belong to a different specimen entirely. By comparing field notes, photographs, and collection records, the correcting authors were able to identify the specimen actually depicted in the original description and to correct both the holotype designation and the associated type locality. The case illustrates the kinds of curatorial errors that can affect type-locality data and the process by which they are formally rectified in the taxonomic literature.

In a taxonomic revision of the Malagasy rodent genus Nesomys, later authors reviewed historical museum material and early collectors' travels to resolve vague or missing original locality information for some species names. On this basis, they designated lectotypes from among original material and restricted the type localities to their probable geographic sources, bringing the stated type localities into line with the evidence associated with the type material. The case illustrates the ICZN mechanism by which a lectotype designation can fix the type locality through the provenance of the lectotype, even when older literature has circulated broader or conflicting locality statements.

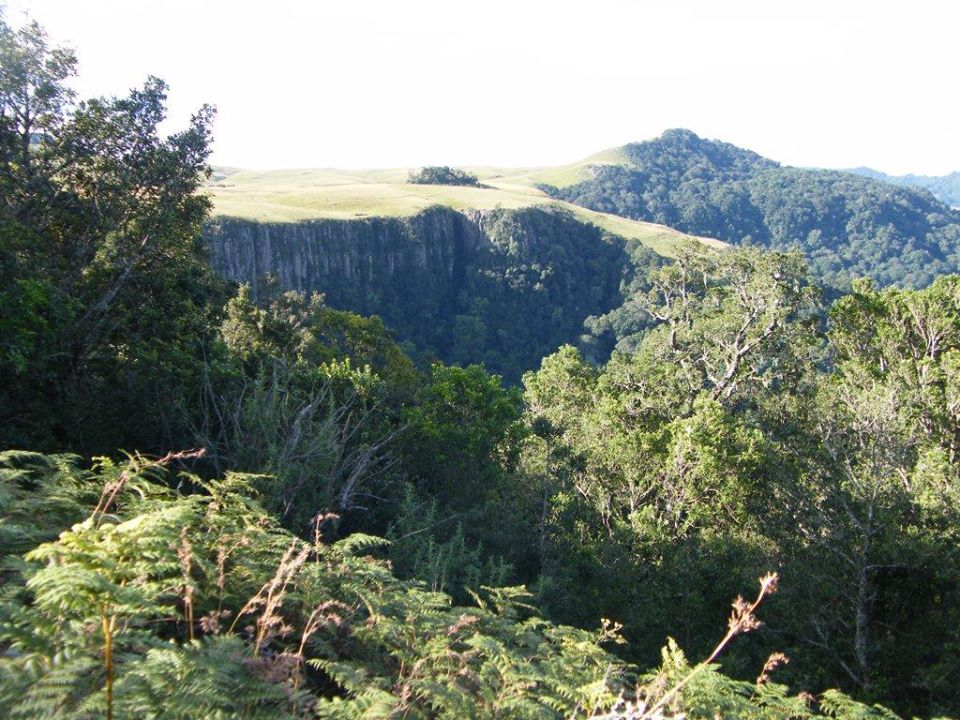
Karkloof Forest in the KwaZulu-Natal Midlands, South Africa, an area proposed as the likely collecting region for some of Nylander's 'Port-Natal' lichen material

Naja kaouthia Lesson, 1831 (the monocled cobra) was originally described with the vague type locality "Bengale, Inde". Because the original holotype had been lost and the name had growing importance for resolving taxonomic confusion within the Asiatic cobras, Balchan and colleagues designated a neotype in 2025, thereby restricting the type locality to 24 Parganas, West Bengal, India – a specific district within the original broad region. This is a direct application of ICZN Article 76.3: the provenance of the neotype became the new type locality, replacing the earlier ambiguous statement.

In a phylogenomic study of the plant genus Antirrhinum (snapdragons), Otero, Fernández-Mazuecos, and Vargas deliberately collected specimens from the locus classicus of each recognised species to ensure that the material used in genotyping by sequencing analysis was reliably linked to the relevant species name. They noted that most phylogenetic studies select material opportunistically, which can introduce taxonomic uncertainty; by sampling topotypic material instead, they could test whether named species corresponded to genetically distinct lineages. The study sampled at least two topotypic specimens per species and found that the use of type-locality material improved the resolution of species boundaries compared with earlier analyses that had used convenience samples.

In 2019, Ian Medeiros investigated the provenance of William Nylander's 1868 lichen taxa described from "Port-Natal", where the original publication gave only a sparse locality and identified the collector as "Miss Armstrong". Using archival correspondence, historical maps, and herbarium and specimen-database evidence, Medeiros argued that "Miss Armstrong" was probably Olivia Wolfenden Armstrong and that the collections were most likely made in the Karkloof area of the Midlands of KwaZulu-Natal rather than in coastal Durban. The study also located much of the relevant original material (including types) in the Dublin herbarium (DBN), providing a starting point for later taxonomic reassessment and for attempts to relocate taxa known only from their type locality.
