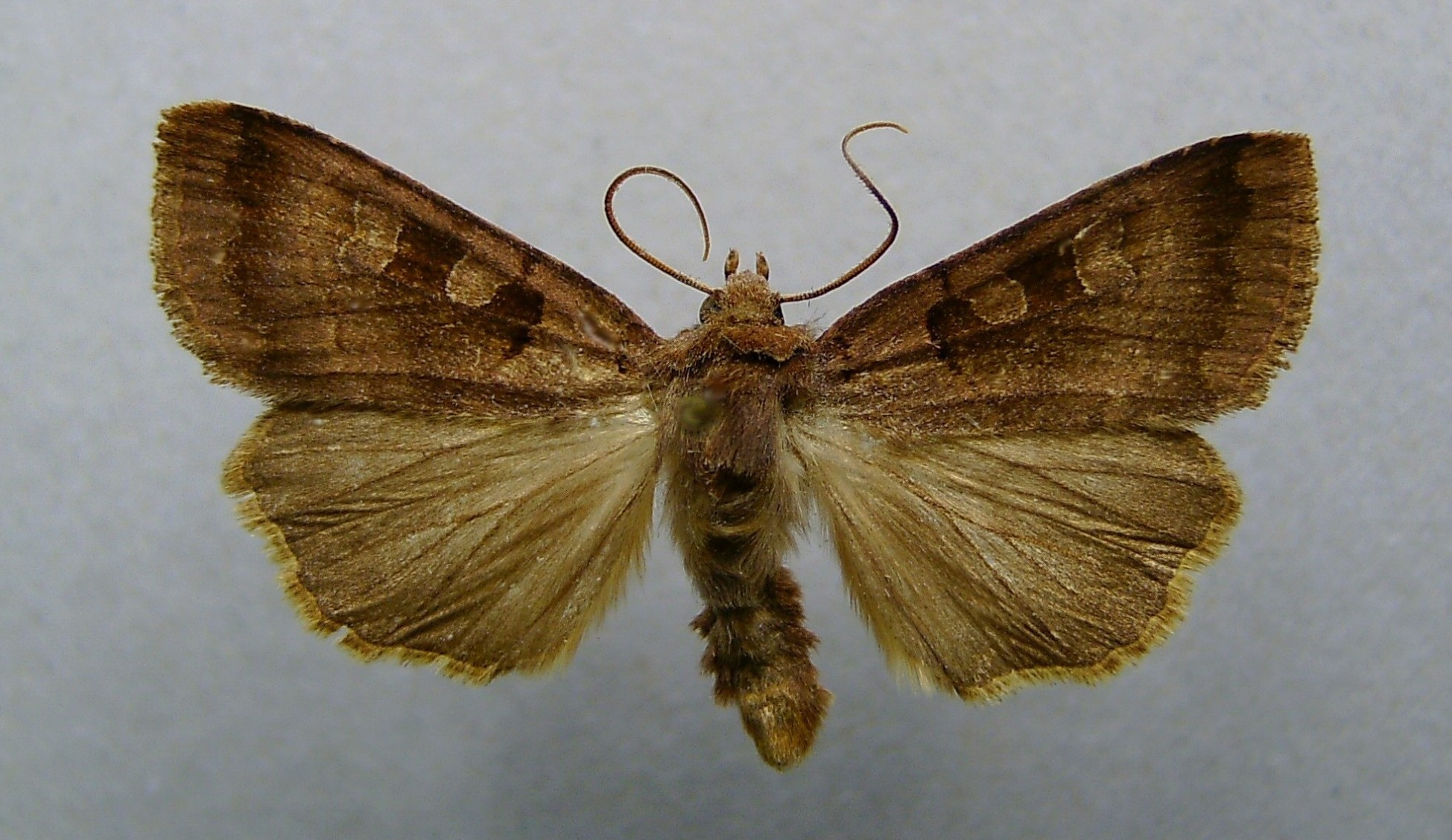

Scientific classification
- Kingdom: Animalia
- Phylum: Arthropoda
- Clade: Pancrustacea
- Class: Insecta
- Order: Lepidoptera
- Superfamily: Noctuoidea
- Family: Noctuidae
- Genus: Xestia
- Species: X. stigmatica

Binomial name
- Xestia stigmatica (Hübner, [1813])

Synonyms
- Phalaena (Noctua) rhomboidea auct. (non Esper, 1790: misidentification); Noctua stigmatica Hübner, [1813] Xestia rhomboidea auct. (non Esper, 1790: misidentification)

= Xestia stigmatica =

Species of moth

Xestia stigmatica, the square-spotted clay, is a moth of the family Noctuidae. It is found in most of Europe, Transcaucasia, Caucasus, Kazakhstan, northern Turkey and northern Iran.

The wingspan is 37–44 mm. Distinguished from other Xestia species by the broad forewing coloured greyish dark brown (sometimes purple tinted) and the irregular broad dark band between the wavy line and the outer cross line.

Adults are on wing from in August.

The larvae feed on a variety of plants such as Rubus fruticosus, Urtica dioica, Prunus spinosa, Primula and Betula.

== Taxonomy ==
The species was known as X. rhomboidea up to 1997. Since the taxonomic revision by Hacker in 1998, the name Xestia stigmatica is in use and was used by Fibiger and Skuhle in 2004 as well as on Fauna Europaea. The reason for the change is that Phalaena Noctua rhomboidea as described by Eugenius Johann Christoph Esper in 1790 is actually the double square-spot (X. triangulum), but Esper's name had been misapplied to the square-spotted clay.
