= Author citation (zoology) =

Person(s) who published a zoological name

In zoological nomenclature, author citation is the process in which a person is credited with the creation of the scientific name of a previously unnamed taxon. When citing the author of the scientific name, one must fulfill the formal requirements listed under the International Code of Zoological Nomenclature ("the Code"). According to Article 51.1 of the Code, "The name of the author does not form part of the name of a taxon and its citation is optional, although customary and often advisable." However, recommendation 51A suggests, "The original author and date of a name should be cited at least once in each work dealing with the taxon denoted by that name. This is especially important and has a unique character between homonyms and in identifying species-group names which are not in their native combinations." For the sake of information retrieval, the author citation and year appended to the scientific name, e.g. genus-species-author-year, genus-author-year, family-author-year, etc., is often considered a "de-facto" unique identifier, although this usage may often be imperfect.

== Rank ==
The Code recognizes three groups of names, according to rank:

- family-group names at the ranks of superfamily, family, subfamily, tribe, subtribe (any rank below superfamily and above genus).
- genus-group names at the ranks of genus and subgenus.
- species-group names at the ranks of species and subspecies.

Within each group, the same authorship applies regardless of the taxon level to which the name (with, in the case of a family-group name, the appropriate ending) is applied. For example, the taxa that the red admiral butterfly can be assigned to is as follows:

- Family: Nymphalidae Swainson, 1827
  - Subfamily: Nymphalinae Swainson, 1827
  - Tribe: Nymphalini Swainson, 1827
- Genus: Vanessa Fabricius, 1807
  - Subgenus: Vanessa (Vanessa) Fabricius, 1807
- Species: Vanessa atalanta (Linnaeus, 1758)
  - Subspecies: Vanessa atalanta atalanta (Linnaeus, 1758)
  The parentheses around the author citation indicate that this was not the original taxonomic placement. In this case, Linnaeus published the name as Papilio atalanta Linnaeus, 1758.

== Identity of the author(s) ==
In the first attempt to provide international rules for zoological nomenclature in 1895, the author was defined as the author of the scientific description, and not as the person who provided the name (published or unpublished), this was the usual practice in the nomenclature of various animal groups before. As a result, some disciplines such as malacology required a change in authorship regarding their taxonomic names as they had been attributed to persons who had never published a scientific work.

This new rule was not sufficiently precise, so in the following decades, taxonomic practice continued to diverge among disciplines and authors. The ambiguity led a member of the ICZN Commission in 1974 to provide a more clear interpretation in the second edition of the Code (effective since 1961). Here, a suggestion was made that the author is defined as the individual who "publishes the name and the qualifying conditions...or equally clearcut attribution of name and description".

The current view among some taxonomists restricts authorship for a taxonomic name to the person who wrote the textual scientific content of the original description. The author of an image is not recognized as a co-author of a name, even if the image was the only basis provided for making the name available.

If a true author of a written text is not directly recognizable in the original publication, they are not the author of a name (but the author of the work is). The text could actually be written by a different person. Some authors have copied text passages from unpublished sources without acknowledging them. In Art. 50.1.1 all these persons are excluded from the authorship of a name if they were not explicitly mentioned in the work itself as being the responsible persons for making a name available.

Most taxonomists also accept Art. 50.1.1 that the author of a cited previously published source, from which text passages were copied, is not acknowledged as the author of a name.

In some cases, the author of the description can differ from the author of the work. This must be explicitly indicated in the original publication, either by a general statement ("all zoological descriptions in this work were written by Smith") or by an individual statement ("the following three descriptions were provided by Jiménez," "this name shall be attributed to me and Wang because she contributed to the description").

In the 1800s it was the usual style to eventually set an abbreviation of another author immediately below the text of the description to indicate authorship. This is commonly accepted today; if the description is attributed to a different person, then that person is the author.

When the name of a different author was only set behind the new name in the headline (and not repeated below the description to indicate that description had been written by that person), this was a convention to indicate authorship only for the new name and not for the description. These authorships for names are not covered by Art. 50.1 and are not accepted. Only authorship for the description is accepted.

Prior to 1900–1920, there were several different conventions concerning authorship which is why we frequently find other authors than today for zoological names in early zoological literature. Art. 50.1 has been an accepted model since the mid-1900s. It eliminated the need to research who the true author was and all readers could verify and determine the name of the author in the original work itself.

== Examples to illustrate practical use ==
In citing the name of an author, the surname is given in full, not abbreviated. The date (true year) of publication in which the name was established is added. If desired, a comma is placed between the author and date (the comma is not prescribed under the Code, it contains no additional information. However, it is included in examples therein and also in the ICZN Official Lists and Indexes).

- Balaena mysticetus Linnaeus, 1758

The bowhead whale was described and named by Linnaeus in his Systema Naturae of 1758.

- Anser albifrons (Scopoli, 1769)

The white-fronted goose was first described (by Giovanni Antonio Scopoli), as Branta albifrons Scopoli, 1769. It is currently placed in the genus Anser, so author and year are set in parentheses. The taxonomist who first placed the species in Anser is not recorded (and much less cited), and the two different genus-species combinations are regarded as synonyms.

An author can have established a name dedicated to oneself. This is rare and against unwritten conventions, but is not restricted under the Code.

- Xeropicta krynickii (Krynicki, 1833)

This terrestrial gastropod from Ukraine was first described as Helix krynickii Krynicki, 1833. The name was originally attributed to have been written by another person, Andrzejowski, but the description was written by Krynicki, and Andrzejowski had not published this name before.

== Spelling of the name of the author ==
In a strict application of the Code, the taxon name author string components "genus," "species," and "year" can only have one combination of characters. The major problem in zoology for consistent spellings of names is the author. The Code gives neither a guide nor a detailed recommendation.

Unlike in botany, it is not recommended to abbreviate the name of the author in zoology. If a name was established by more than three authors, it is allowed to give only the first author, followed by the term "et al." (and others).

There are no approved standards for the spellings of authors in zoology, and unlike in botany, no one has ever proposed such standards for zoological authors.

It is generally accepted that the name of the author shall be given in the nominative singular case if originally given in a different case and that the name of the author should be spelled in Latin script. There are no commonly accepted conventions on how to transcribe the names of authors if given in non-Latin script.

It is also widely accepted that the names of authors must be spelled with diacritic marks, ligatures, spaces, and punctuation marks. The first letter is normally spelled in upper-case, however, initial capitalization and usage of accessory terms can be inconsistent (e.g. de Wilde/De Wilde, d'Orbigny/D'Orbigny, Saedeleer/De Saedeleer, etc.). Co-authors are separated by commas; the last co-author should be separated by "&". In Chinese and Korean names only the surname is generally cited.

Examples:

- Pipadentalium Yoo, 1988 (Scaphopoda)
- Sinentomon Yin, 1965 (Protura)
- Belbolla huanghaiensis Huang & Zhang, 2005 (Nematoda)

Apart from these, there are no commonly accepted conventions. The author can either be spelled following a self-made standard (Linnaeus 1758, Linnaeus 1766), or as given in the original source which implies that names of persons are not always spelled consistently (Linnæus 1758, Linné 1766), or we are dealing with composed data sets without any consistent standard.

== Inferred and anonymous authorships ==
In some publications, the author responsible for new names and nomenclatural acts is not stated directly in the original source, but can sometimes be inferred from reliable external evidence. Recommendation 51D of the Code states: "...if the authorship is known or inferred from external evidence, the name of the author, if cited, should be enclosed in square brackets to show the original anonymity".

== Initials ==
If the same surname is common to more than one author, initials are sometimes given (for example "A. Agassiz" vs. "L. Agassiz", etc.), but there are no standards concerning this procedure, and not all animal groups/databases use this convention. Although initials are often regarded as useful to disambiguate different persons with the same surname, this does not work in all situations (for example "W. Smith", "C. Pfeiffer", "G. B. Sowerby" and other names occur more than once), and in the examples given in the Code and also the ICZN Official Lists and Indexes, initials are not used.

== Implications for information retrieval ==
For a computer, O. F. Müller, O. Müller, and Müller are different strings, even the differences between O. F. Müller, O.F. Müller, and OF Müller can be problematic. Fauna Europaea is a typical example of a database where combined initials O.F. and O. F. are read as entirely different strings so those who try to search for all taxonomic names described by Otto Friedrich Müller have to know (1) that the submitted data by the various data providers contained several versions (O. F. Müller, O.F. Müller, Müller, and O. Müller), and (2) that in many databases, the search function will not find O.F. Müller if you search for O. F. Müller or Müller, not to mention alternative orthographies of this name such as Mueller or Muller.

Thus, the usage of (e.g.) genus-species-author-year, genus-author-year, family-author-year, etc. as "de facto" unique identifiers for biodiversity informatics purposes can present problems on account of variation in cited author surnames, presence/absence/variations in cited initials, and minor variants in the style of presentation, as well as variant cited authors (responsible person/s) and sometimes, cited dates for what may be in fact the same nomenclatural act in the same work. In addition, in a small number of cases, the same author may have created the same name more than once in the same year for different taxa, which can then only be distinguished by reference to the title, page, and sometimes line of the work in which each name appears.

In Australia, a program was created (TAXAMATCH) that provides a tool to indicate in a preliminary manner whether two variants of a taxon name should be accepted as identical or not according to the similarity of the cited author strings. The authority matching function of TAXAMATCH assigns a moderate-to-high similarity to author strings with minor orthographic and/or date differences, such as "Medvedev & Chernov, 1969" vs. "Medvedev & Cernov, 1969", or "Schaufuss, 1877" vs. "L. W. Schaufuss, 1877", or even "Oshmarin, 1952" vs. "Oschmarin in Skrjabin & Evranova, 1952", and a low similarity to author citations which are very different (for example "Hyalesthes Amyot, 1847" vs. "Hyalesthes Signoret, 1865") and are more likely to represent different publication instances, and therefore possibly also different taxa. The program also understands standardized abbreviations as used in botany and sometimes in zoology as well; for example, "Rchb." for Reichenbach, but may still fail for non-standard abbreviations (such as "H. & A. Ad." for H. & A. Adams, where the normal citation would in fact be "Adams & Adams"). Non-standard abbreviations must then be picked up by subsequent manual inspection after the use of an algorithmic approach to pre-sort the names to be matched into groups of either more or less similar names and cited authorities. However, author names that are spelled very similarly but in fact represent different persons, and who independently authored identical taxon names, will not be adequately separated by this program; examples include "O. F. Müller 1776" vs. "P. L. S. Müller 1776", "G. B. Sowerby I 1850" vs. "G. B. Sowerby III 1875" and "L. Pfeiffer 1856" vs. "K. L. Pfeiffer 1956", so additional manual inspection is also required, especially for known problem cases such as those given above.

A further cause of errors that would not be detected by such a program include authors with multi-part surnames which are sometimes inconsistently applied in the literature, and works where the accepted attribution has changed over time. For example, genera published in the anonymously authored work "Museum Boltenianum sive catalogus cimeliorum..." published in 1798 were for a long time ascribed to Bolten, but are now considered to have been authored by Röding according to a ruling by the ICZN in 1956. Analogous problems are encountered attempting to cross-link medical records by patient name; for relevant discussion see record linkage.

== Author of a nomen nudum ==
A new name mentioned without description or indication or figure is a nomen nudum. A nomen nudum has no authorship nor date and is not an available name. If it is desired or necessary to cite the author of such an unavailable name, the nomenclatural status of the name should be made evident.

== Sensu names ==
A "sensu" name (sensu = "in the sense of", should not be written in italics) is a previously established name that was used by an author in an incorrect sense (for example for a species that was misidentified). Technically this is only a subsequent use of a name, not a new name, and it has no own authorship. Taxonomists often created unwritten rules for authorships of sensu names to record the first and original source for a misidentification of an animal, but this is not in accordance with the Code.

Example:

- For a West Alpine snail Pupa ferrari Porro, 1838, Hartmann (1841) used the genus Sphyradium Charpentier, 1837, which Charpentier had established for some similar species. Westerlund argued in 1887 that this species should be placed in another genus, and proposed the name Coryna for Pupa ferrari and some other species. Pilsbry argued in 1922, Westerlund had established Coryna as a new replacement name for Sphyradium, sensu Hartmann, 1841 (therefore "sensu" should not be written in italics, the term Sphyradium sensu Hartmann, 1841 would be misunderstood as a species name). But since a sensu name is not an available name with its own author and year, Pilsbry's argument is not consistent with the ICZN Code's rules.

== See also ==
- Author citation (botany)
- Glossary of scientific naming
- List of authors of names published under the ICZN
- Wikispecies: Taxon authorities
