= MilliBase =

Online database of millipedes

MilliBase is an online taxonomic database of all species of class Diplopoda, commonly referred to as millipedes. It is supported by the National Science Foundation, The Field Museum, and LifeWatch Belgium. As of July 2026, 14,259 accepted species are included.
