= PESI =

PESI may refer to:

- Pan-European Species directories Infrastructure
- Pulmonary Embolism Severity Index
