= Salvia hasankeyfensis =

Scientific classification
- Kingdom: Plantae
- Clade: Tracheophytes
- Clade: Angiosperms
- Clade: Eudicots
- Clade: Asterids
- Order: Lamiales
- Family: Lamiaceae
- Genus: Salvia
- Species: S. hasankeyfensis

Binomial name
- Salvia hasankeyfensis Dirmenci, Celep & Ö. Güner, 2015

Synonyms
- Salvia hasankeyfense

Species of flowering plant

Salvia hasankeyfensis (Hasankeyf sage) is a recently identified species of wild sage native to the town of Hasankeyf in southeast Turkey and surrounding areas. The species was discovered during fieldwork in Hasankeyf in 2014 by Tuncay Dirmenci and Özal Güner, and described by them in a 2015 paper written with Ferhat Celep. It appears to be related to Salvia verbenaca, but the authors identify many distinguishing characteristics including S. hasankeyfensis's white petals (they are lilac to purple in S. verbenaca), and the shapes of the plants' leaves at the base and along the stem. They say it "clearly differs in having denser, narrower, subsessile leaves [that are] always pinnatisect, oblong in outline, a completely different indumentum and white flowers."

S. hasankeyfensis is a perennial herb with a woody rootstock. The hairy stems grow 15–50 cm and sometimes branch. It has basal leaves 2–9 cm long and 0.2-2.5 cm across, that are irregularly lobed. There are also oblong leaves on the stems, 0.4–2.5 cm long and 0.2–1.0 cm across. The slender inflorescences bear flowers with grey-green sepals and white petals. It is in flower from June to mid-July, and the seeds ripen from July to August. The plant grows in rocky cracks at an elevation of 650–700 m. In contrast, S. verbenaca has a far broader range of habitats including forest clearings, roadsides, rocky slopes and deciduous woodland.

Initial research has estimated that it occurs only within an area of less than 10 km^{2} and that there are fewer than 250 mature plants. Once Turkey fills the reservoir behind the Ilısu Dam, under construction on the Tigris river downstream of Hasankeyf, this species may face extinction. Accordingly, the paper identifying this new species proposes that it be designated as Critically Endangered. The normal elevation of the reservoir will be 525 m, 125 m below the bottom of S. hasankeyfensis's range, but the presence of a large nearby lake in a formerly arid environment may be expected to change the overall ecology significantly.

The initial publication of this new species used the name Salvia hasankeyfense, but the specific epithet was later corrected to hasankeyfensis to conform with the feminine gender of Salvia.

== Sources ==
- Celep, Ferhat; Dirmenci, Tuncay; Güner, Özal (25 September 2015), "Salvia hasankeyfense (Lamiaceae), a new species from Hasankeyf (Batman, South-eastern Turkey)", Phytotaxa, 227 (3): 289–294, doi:10.11646/phytotaxa.227.3.9, ISSN 1179-3163
- "Plant Name Details: Lamiaceae Salvia hasankeyfensis Dirmenci, Celep & Ö. Güner". International Plant Names Index. 28 September 2015.
