= Biodiversity Informatics (journal) =

Scientific journal

- Discipline: Biodiversity informatics
- Language: English

Publication details
- History: 2004–present
- Publisher: University of Kansas (United States)
- License: CC BY NC
- Impact factor: 3.6 (2025)

Standard abbreviations
- ISO 4: Biodivers. Inform.

Indexing
- ISSN: 1546-9735
- LCCN: 2003212387
- OCLC no.: 53141488

Links
- Journal homepage

Biodiversity Informatics is a journal for the field of biodiversity informatics, which is the application of different information technology tools, methods and techniques to the study and management of biodiversity. This means essentially the organization of databases, and their analysis, visualizing and querying. The number of biodiversity databases is also growing, at a fast pace, and there is clear need to have concepts and tools for their management and analysis. The community of scientists in the field of biodiversity informatics is growing, and it is very well represented by scientists in Africa, Asia and Latin America.

In 2004, scientists at the University of Kansas decided to launch a journal. Journal of Biodiversity Informatics is a "platinum" open access type of journal, which means that there are no charges for publishing or reading the journal.

The journal's 2025 impact factor is of 3.6 according to Journal Citation Reports.

== See also ==
- Bioinformatics
