= List of biodiversity databases =

This is a list of biodiversity databases. Biodiversity databases store taxonomic information alone or more commonly also other information like distribution (spatial) data and ecological data, which provide information on the biodiversity of a particular area or group of living organisms. They may store specimen-level information, species-level information, information on nomenclature, or any combination of the above. Most are available online.

Specimen-focused databases contain data about individual specimens, as represented by vouchered museum specimens, collections of specimen photographs, data on field-based specimen observations and morphological or genetic data. Species-focused databases contain information summarised at the species-level. Some species-focused databases attempt to compile comprehensive data about particular species (FishBase), while others focus on particular species attributes, such as checklists of species in a given area (FEOW) or the conservation status of species (CITES or IUCN Red List). Nomenclators act as summaries of taxonomic revisions and set a key between specimen-focused and species-focused databases. They do this because taxonomic revisions use specimen data to determine species limits.

Name	Focus	Groups included										Collection	Link
Name	Focus	Plants	Fungi	Mammals	Birds	Reptiles	Amphi-bians	Fish	Arthropods	Other Euk.	Prok. & Vir.	Collection	
ABRS Databases	Plants, Animals and Ecosystems of Australia	X	X	X	X	X	X	X	X	X		A comprehensive list of databases for Australian Flora and Fauna	https://www.dcceew.gov.au/science-research/abrs/online-resources
AlgaeBase	Algae and other oxygenic photosynthesisers other than embryophyte land plants	X								X	X	Higher taxonomy, scientific names, common names, images, distribution, references	https://www.algaebase.org/
All Catfish Species Inventory	Catfish							X				information collated by genera, including estimated numbers of species, taxonomic experts	http://silurus.acnatsci.org/
AmphibiaWeb	Amphibians						X					Information about almost 9,000 species of amphibians	https://amphibiaweb.org/
AntWeb	Ants								X			Specimen information, collection details, photographs, higher taxonomy	https://www.antweb.org/
Arctos	Specimen holdings of several natural history museums, agencies, and accessible private collections	X	X	X	X	X	X	X	X	X		Vertebrates, invertebrates, parasites, vascular and non-vascular plants, many with images and extensive usage data.	https://arctos.database.museum/
Avibase – the World Bird Database	Birds, distribution, taxonomy				X							Avibase is an extensive database information system about all birds of the world, containing over 27 million records about 10,000 species and 22,000 subspecies of birds, including distribution information for 20,000 regions, taxonomy, synonyms in several languages and more	https://avibase.bsc-eoc.org/avibase.jsp?lang=EN
ASEAN Biodiversity Information Sharing Service (BISS)	Amphibians, birds, butterflies, dragonflies, edible plants, freshwater fishes, mammals, plants, reptiles and Malesian mosses of Southeast Asia	X	X	X	X	X	X	X	X	X	X	IUCN status, habitat, regional presence/absence, description, classification	https://asean.chm-cbd.net/documents/biodiversity-information-management-cultivating-culture-information-sharing
BacDive	Metadatabase that provides strain-linked information about bacterial and archaeal biodiversity.									X	X	Different kind of metadata like taxonomy, morphology, physiology, environment and molecular-biology	https://bacdive.dsmz.de/
BioLib – Biological Library	BioLib is an international encyclopedia of plants, fungi and animals.	X	X	X	X	X	X	X	X	X	X	Apart from taxonomic system you can visit the gallery, glossary, vernacular names dictionary, database of links and literature, systems of biotopes, discussion forum and several other functions related to biology	https://www.biolib.cz/en/
CITES species database	All species ever listed in CITES Appendices I, II or III	X	X	X	X	X	X	X	X	X		Scientific names, higher taxonomy, distribution, photos and CITES quotas	http://www.speciesplus.net/about
Catalogue of Life (CoL)	All forms of life and viruses	X	X	X	X	X	X	X	X	X	X	Highly complete database with various information about known species	https://www.catalogueoflife.org/
Collecting Missions Biodiversity	Cultivated Plants	X										An agricultural heritage of cultivated plants and their wild relatives with access to original passport data of more than 220.000 samples collected around the world during Bioversity International (before the International Board for Plant Genetic Resources) supported missions. Bioversity International. Available from www.bioversityinternational.org.	http://www.bioversityinternational.org/e-library/databases/collecting-missions/
Encyclopedia of Life (EOL)	All forms of life and viruses	X	X	X	X	X	X	X	X	X	X	Highly complete database with various information about known species	https://naturalhistory.si.edu/research/eol
Fauna Europaea	Europe's main zoological taxonomic index			X	X	X	X	X	X	X		Quality-checked data, 180,712 accepted taxon names, web portal also provide links to other key biodiversity services	https://www.gbif.org/dataset/90d9e8a6-0ce1-472d-b682-3451095dbc5a
Finnish Biodiversity Info Facility	All kinds of life and viruses in Finland	X	X	X	X	X	X	X	X	X	X	Taxonomy, distribution, species descriptions.	https://laji.fi/
FishBase	Fish							X				Higher taxonomy, common names, distribution, IUCN Redlist status	https://www.fishbase.se/search.php
FishNet 2	Fish							X				Information about fish taxon distribution	https://www.fishnet2.net/about
Flora and Fauna Database of Bangladesh	Animals and plants of Bangladesh	X		X	X	X	X	X	X			A comprehensive list of databases for Bangladeshi Flora and Fauna	https://ffdb.bd/
Freshwater Ecoregions of the World (FEOW)	Freshwater ecoregions	X	X	X	X	X	X	X	X	X	X	Maps of species and endemic numbers	https://www.feow.org/
Fulgoromorpha Lists On the Web (FLOW)	Planthoppers (Insecta: Hemiptera: Fulgoromorpha) – 15.000 species								X			Taxonomy and classification, nomenclature, type depository, bibliography, distribution, photos on actual and fossil planthoppers of the world and various associated biological information (host-plants, parasites, trophobiosis, etc.)	https://flow.hemiptera-databases.org/flow/
Global Biodiversity Information Facility (GBIF)	All forms of life	X	X	X	X	X	X	X	X	X	X	All forms of life and a map of known occurrences with data about such occurrences. Also taxonomy and links to other databases	https://www.gbif.org/
Georgia Biodiversity Database	Georgia (country) biodiversity website	X		X	X	X	X	X	X	X		Checklists covering ca. 11,000 of plants and animals recorded for Georgia (Central and Western Caucasus)	https://biodiversity.iliauni.edu.ge/en
HerpNET	Amphibians and reptiles of Iowa, Minnesota and North Dakota					X	X					Amphibian and reptile distributions	http://www.herpnet.net/
iAMF	Arbuscular Mycorrhizal Fungi Database for Phylogeny, Nomenclature, Taxonomy and Distribution in India		X									Distribution, phylogeny and taxonomy database of arbuscular mycorrhizal fungi was built in two phases: In the first phase of the study (2013–2015) occurrence of about 148 species of AM fungi was reported across 18 states of India namely: Andhra Pradesh, Assam, Bihar, Goa, Haryana, Jammu and Kashmir, Karnataka, Kerala, Madhya Pradesh, Maharashtra, Meghalaya, Orissa, Punjab, Rajasthan, Tamil Nadu, Uttarkhand, Uttar Pradesh and West Bengal (Gupta et al. 2014, under Delhi University innovation project) . In the second phase under UGC project (2015 onwards) the study has been extended to three more states namely Delhi, Tripura and Manipur reporting occurrence of 161 species. rRNA sequence data for these fungi is added as Phylogenetic Map and distribution data is available as Google Map	https://globalamfungi.com/
Integrated Botanical Information System (IBIS)	Plants of Australia	X										Taxonomic information, collection details, photographs	https://www.anbg.gov.au/ibis/
iNaturalist	All forms of life	X	X	X	X	X	X	X	X	X	X	Geolocated observations, location checklists, taxonomic information, range maps	https://www.inaturalist.org/
iSpot	All forms of life large enough to photograph	X	X	X	X	X	X	X	X	X		Geolocated individual observations and other information produced by citizen science participants	https://nbn.org.uk/tools-and-resources/useful-websites/ispot/
Integrated Taxonomic Information System (ITIS)	All taxa of interest to North America, with other taxa included as available	X	X	X	X	X	X	X	X	X	X	Taxonomic information, including higher taxonomy	https://www.itis.gov/
JACQ	Specimens from various Herbaria	X										Contains information about plant specimen taxonomy and collection information	https://jacq.org/
Mammal Networked Information System (MaNIS)	Mammals			X								The original objectives of MaNIS were to 1) facilitate open access to combined specimen data from a web browser, 2) enhance the value of specimen collections, 3) conserve curatorial resources, and 4) use a design paradigm that can be easily adopted by other disciplines with similar needs. The system just as FishNet, HerpNET and ORNIS refers now to the VertNet portal. Available on manisnet.org, visited 29 May 2014.	http://www.vifabio.de/en/iqfBio/detail/3626
MicrobeWiki	Microbes									X	X	Higher taxonomic information, scientific/vernacular names, images, attributes, references	https://microbewiki.kenyon.edu/index.php/MicrobeWiki
MolluscaBase	Molluscs									X		MolluscaBase is a taxonomically oriented database that aims to provide an authoritative, permanently updated account of all molluscan species – marine, freshwater, and terrestrial, extant and fossil, and across all classes.	https://www.molluscabase.org
Monarch Data Portal	Museum specimens (zoology, botany, geology)	X	X	X	X	X	X	X	X			Open access biodiversity data (taxonomy, geography, images)	
Mosquito Taxonomic Inventory	Culicidae family (mosquitoes)											Taxonomy, literature, references	https://mosquito-taxonomic-inventory.myspecies.info/
Natural History Information System	all forms of life, biotopes, rocks	X	X	X	X	X	X	X	X	X	X	Faunistic and floristic records (citizen science and other sources), phenology, ecology, biotopes, taxonomy, paleontology, stratigraphy	
Naturdata	Portuguese taxa	X	X	X	X	X	X	X	X	X	X	Checklist of Portuguese species including mainland and islands with a page for each species including taxonomy, synonyms, vernacular names, images, videos and Portuguese distribution	https://naturdata.com/
NatureServe	plants, animals, and ecosystems of the United States and Canada	X		X	X	X	X	X	X	X		Source for information on more than 70,000 plants, animals, and ecosystems of the United States and Canada, including rare and endangered species	https://www.natureserve.org/
New World Fruits	Fruits (Plants)	X										The New World Fruits Database aims at providing easier access to some basic, but often difficult to obtain, information on fruits from the New World (North- and South America). Key information provided includes data on nomenclature, taxonomic and vernacular, on fruit and plant uses and on distribution and origin. Bioversity International. Available from www.bioversityinternational.org.	http://www.bioversityinternational.org/e-library/databases/new-world-fruits/
A Pan-European Species-directories Infrastructure (PESI)	European taxa	X	X	X	X	X	X	X	X	X		Authoritative taxonomic checklist of European species, including higher taxonomy, synonyms, vernacular names and European distribution	https://www.eu-nomen.eu/pesi/
Pl@ntNet	Plants identification, observation, images	X										Plant identification, observations, citizen science project, photographs, distribution	https://plantnet.org/en/
Reptile Database	Reptiles					X						Taxonomic information, names, photos	https://reptile-database.reptarium.cz/
ScaleNet	Scale insects (superfamily Coccoidea)								X			Nomenclature, distribution, hosts, systematics, references	https://scalenet.info/
Tropicos	Taxonomy, distribution, and specimen data for Missouri Botanical Garden.	X										Nearly 1.3 million scientific names and over 4.4 million specimen records, accumulated during the past 30 years	https://www.tropicos.org/
VertNet	All Life	X	X	X	X	X	X	X	X	X	X	VertNet is a collaborative project funded by the National Science Foundation (NSF) that makes biodiversity data free and available on the web. VertNet is a tool designed to help people discover, capture, and publish biodiversity data. VertNET data portal (http://www.vertnet.org)	http://www.vertnet.org/index.html
A Database of Plant Biodiversity of West Bengal (WBPBDIVDB)	Plants of West Bengal	X										richness of floral diversity of West Bengal from Terai, Duars, Darjeeling, the eastern Himalayan region and in the mangrove forests of Sundarbans	https://neist.res.in/osadhi/detailstate.php?state=West+Bengal
Walter Reed Biosystematics Unit	Arthropod disease vectors								X			Taxonomy, photos, identification keys, geospatial data	https://storymaps.arcgis.com/stories/88450e14149049eeafc96487cfaa7981
Wikispecies	All forms of life	X	X	X	X	X	X	X	X	X	X	Higher taxonomy, synonyms, vernacular names, references	https://species.wikimedia.org/wiki/Main_Page
World Spider Catalog	Spiders								X			Taxonomy, literature, references	https://wsc.nmbe.ch/
World Register of Marine Species	Marine organisms							X	X	X		Higher taxonomy, scientific names, synonyms, distribution, attributes, references	https://www.marinespecies.org/

== See also ==
- Taxonomic database
- Biodiversity informatics
- Global biodiversity
