= Biodiversity Literature Repository =

- Producer: Plazi, Pensoft and Zenodo (Switzerland)
- History: 2013 to present
- Languages: English

Access
- Cost: Free

Coverage
- Disciplines: biodiversity
- Record depth: Index and FAIR data
- Format coverage: Books / Journal, figures, taxonomic treatments
- Temporal coverage: 1758 - recent
- Geospatial coverage: Worldwide
- No. of records: 293,457

Links
- Website: zenodo.org/communities/biosyslit/
- Title list(s): zenodo.org/communities/biosyslit/search?page=1&size=20

The Biodiversity Literature Repository (BLR) is a biodiversity dedicated community created on November 11, 2013, in Zenodo, the open science repository at CERN and part of the European project OpenAIRE. The goal of BLR is to provide a long-term, stable, open repository that allows deposition of bio-taxonomic articles enhanced with custom metadata and links to data extracted from therein and deposited in BLR. As of April 25, 2021, this includes 94,443 taxonomic treatments and 293,457 figures from 48,993 articles which are made findable, accessible, interoperable and reusable FAIR data. Most of the data is uploaded on a continuous basis by Plazi using its TreatmentBank service based on their Plazi workflow, and Pensoft Publishers using BLR as repository for data published in their journals. The largest single re-user of data is the Global Biodiversity Information Facility (GBIF), using data from within 33,623 processed articles.

== Funding sources ==
The primary funding for the Biodiversity Literature Repository comes via the Arcadia Fund and in kind contribution by Plazi and Pensoft.
