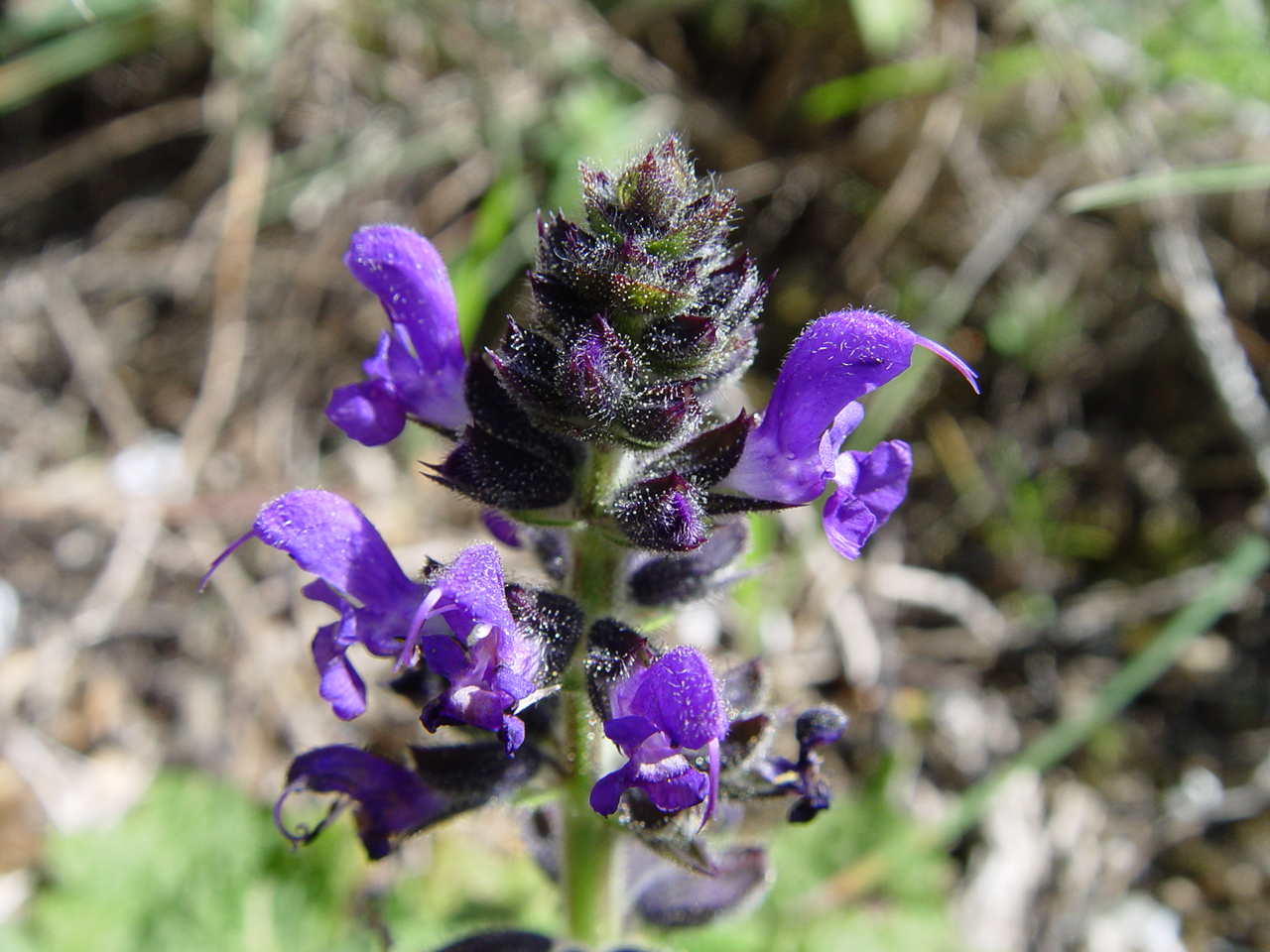

Scientific classification
- Kingdom: Plantae
- Clade: Tracheophytes
- Clade: Angiosperms
- Clade: Eudicots
- Clade: Asterids
- Order: Lamiales
- Family: Lamiaceae
- Genus: Salvia
- Species: S. verbenaca

Binomial name
- Salvia verbenaca L.

Synonyms
- List: Gallitrichum anglicum Jord. & Fourr.; Gallitrichum arvale Jord. & Fourr.; Gallitrichum candollei Timb.-Lagr.; Gallitrichum clandestinum (L.) Fourr.; Gallitrichum dichroanthum Jord. & Fourr.; Gallitrichum horminoides (Pourr.) Timb.-Lagr.; Gallitrichum maculatum Jord. & Fourr.; Gallitrichum pallidiflorum (St.-Amans) Jord. & Fourr.; Gallitrichum ptychophyllum Jord. & Fourr.; Gallitrichum rosulatum Jord. & Fourr.; Gallitrichum rubellum Jord. & Fourr.; Gallitrichum stereocaulon Jord. & Fourr.; Gallitrichum verbenacum (L.) Fourr.; Gallitrichum virgatum Jord. & Fourr.; Horminum parviflorum Moench; Horminum sylvestre Gray; Horminum verbenacum (L.) Mill.; Larnastyra claytonii (Elliott) Raf.; Larnastyra verbenaca (L.) Raf.; Salvia acutata Link; Salvia agrestis Vill., nom. illeg.; Salvia ambigua Rochebr. & Sav., nom. illeg.; Salvia anglica (Jord. & Fourr.) Verl., Arv.-Touv. & Faure; Salvia anselmii Sennen; Salvia barcinonensis Sennen; Salvia barnolae Sennen, nom. nud.; Salvia basilii Sennen; Salvia betonicifolia Lam., nom. illeg.; Salvia byzantina Juss. ex Steud.; Salvia candollei (Timb.-Lagr.) Timb.-Lagr.; Salvia ceratophylla C.A.Mey., nom. illeg.; Salvia clandestina L.; Salvia clandestinoides Link; Salvia claytonii Elliott; Salvia cleistogama de Bary & Paul; Salvia collina Lowe, nom. illeg.; Salvia controversa Ten.; Salvia discolor Sennen, nom. illeg.; Salvia disermas Sm., nom. illeg.; Salvia domenechii Sennen; Salvia dubia Lowe; Salvia electa Sennen; Salvia eriocaulis Sennen, nom. nud.; Salvia erosa Desf.; Salvia fontii Sennen; Salvia gracilis Sennen, nom. illeg.; Salvia hiemalis Brot.; Salvia horminoides var. pinnatiloba Sennen; Salvia horminoides Pourr.; Salvia illyrica Schult.; Salvia intricata Sennen; Salvia laciniata Schult.; Salvia linnaei Rouy; Salvia linnaei subsp. clandestina (L.) Rouy, nom. superfl.; Salvia linnaei subsp. horminoides (Pourr.) Rouy, nom. superfl.; Salvia linnaei subsp. multifida (Sm.) Rouy, nom. illeg.; Salvia linnaei subsp. oblongata (Vahl) Rouy, nom. illeg.; Salvia linnaei subsp. verbenaca (L.) Rouy, nom. illeg.; Salvia lowei Steud.; Salvia mediterranea Sennen; Salvia multifida Sm.; Salvia neglecta Ten.; Salvia oblongata De Not. ex Briq., nom. illeg.; Salvia oblongata Vahl; Salvia obtusata Link, nom. illeg.; Salvia ochroleuca Coss. & Balansa; Salvia pallidiflora St.-Amans; Salvia parviflora Link, nom. illeg.; Salvia polymorpha Hoffmanns. & Link; Salvia praecox Savi; Salvia pyrenaica L.; Salvia rhodantha Zefir.; Salvia sabulicola Pomel; Salvia sennenii Font Quer ex Sennen; Salvia sibthorpii Bory & Chaub., nom. illeg.; Salvia spielmanniana M.Bieb.; Salvia spielmannii Willd., sensu auct.; Salvia subscaposa Sennen; Salvia theodori Sennen; Salvia variabilis Loisel. ex Benth.; Salvia verbenaca subsp. battandieri Maire; Salvia verbenaca subsp. clandestina (L.) Batt.; Salvia verbenaca subsp. claudi Sennen; Salvia verbenaca subsp. controversa (Ten.) Arcang.; Salvia verbenaca subsp. foetens Maire; Salvia verbenaca subsp. horminoides (Pourr.) Nyman; Salvia verbenaca subsp. multifida (Vis.) Briq.; Salvia verbenaca subsp. oblongata (Vahl) Nyman; Salvia verbenaca subsp. ochroleuca (Coss. & Balansa) Maire; Salvia verbenaca subsp. sabulicola (Pomel) Quézel & Santa ex Greuter, Burdet & G.Long; Salvia verbenacoides Brot.; Salvia verbenifolia Salisb.; Salvia vivianii Sieber ex Rchb.; Salvia weihaiensis C.Y.Wu & H.W.Li; Sclarea decidua Moench; Sclarea rhodantha (Zefir.) Soják; Sclarea verbenaca (L.) Soják; Sclarea viscosissima Moench

= Salvia verbenaca =

Species of flowering plant

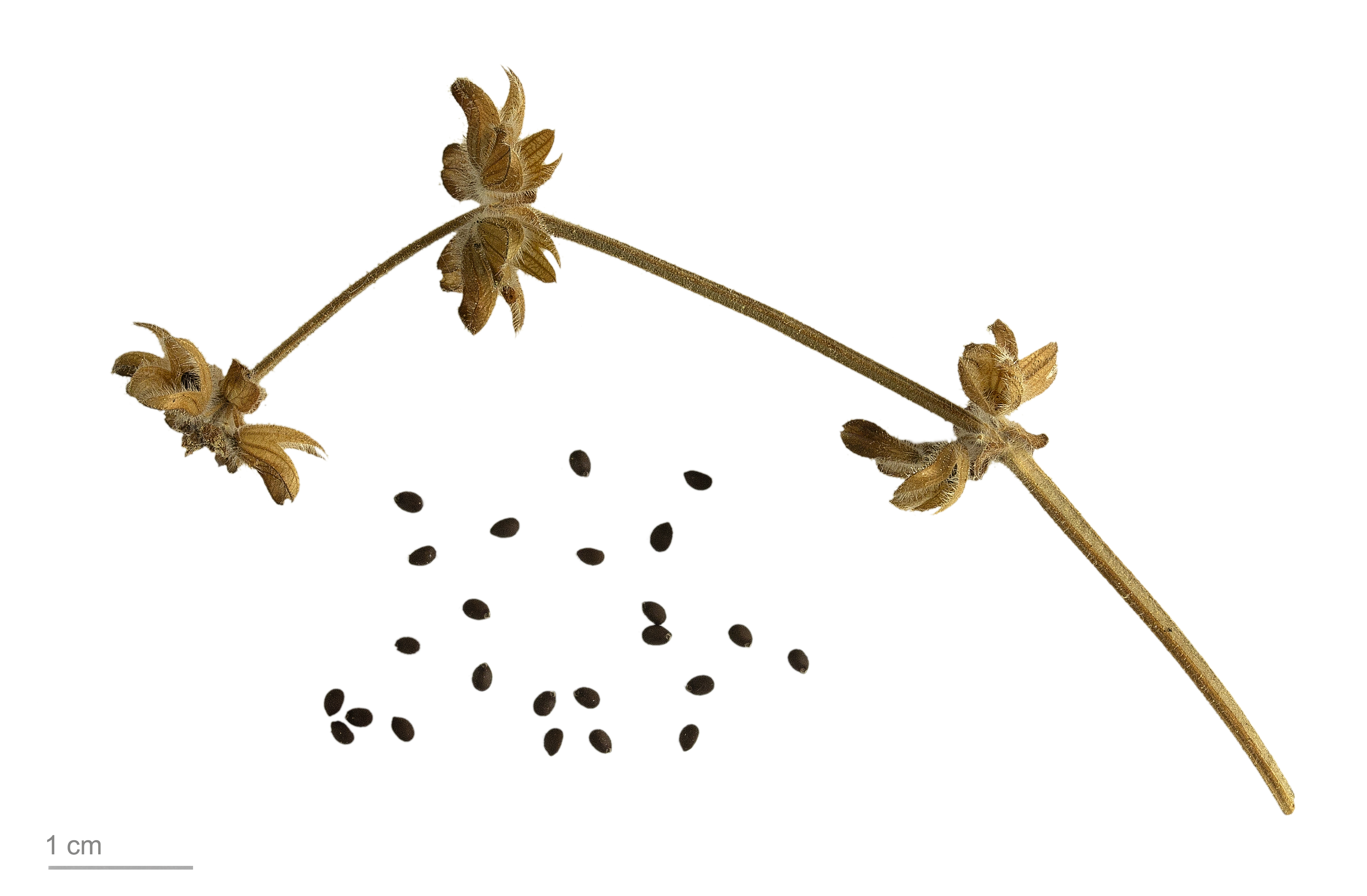
Salvia verbenaca MHNT

Salvia verbenaca, also known as wild clary or wild sage, is native to the British Isles, the Mediterranean region in Southern Europe, North Africa, and Near East, and in the Caucasus. It can be found as an introduced species that has naturalized in many parts of the world, including the eastern United States, California, Mexico, Argentina, Uruguay, southern Africa, Australia, New Zealand and China.

S. verbenaca is a tall perennial herb with hairy stems and branches that erectly sprawl out. Its leaves are basal and toothed and vary from 3 to 10 cm (1.2 to 3.9 in) long. It has soft purple to violet flowers in mid summer. It is in flower from June to September, and the seeds ripen from July to October. The flowers are bisexual and are pollinated by bees. Some are also cleistogamous and pollinate themselves.

The plant is noted for attracting pollinators and wildlife. It prefers neutral and alkaline soils and needs full sun. This aromatic sage is used as a flavoring in foods and to make tea; the flowers can be added to salads.

In China, where it has been known by the synonym Salvia weihaiensis, it grows along the seashore in Shandong.

== Resources ==
- USDA treatment -Salvia verbenaca
- Salvia verbenaca - U.K. Floral images
- R.B.Garden-Sydney: Salvia verbenaca

=== Databases ===
- Salvia verbenaca in the CalPhotos photo database, University of California, Berkeley
- "Salvia verbenaca". Calflora. Berkeley, California: The Calflora Database.
- "Salvia verbenaca". Plants for a Future.
