= Taxonomic treatment =

Section in a scientific publication

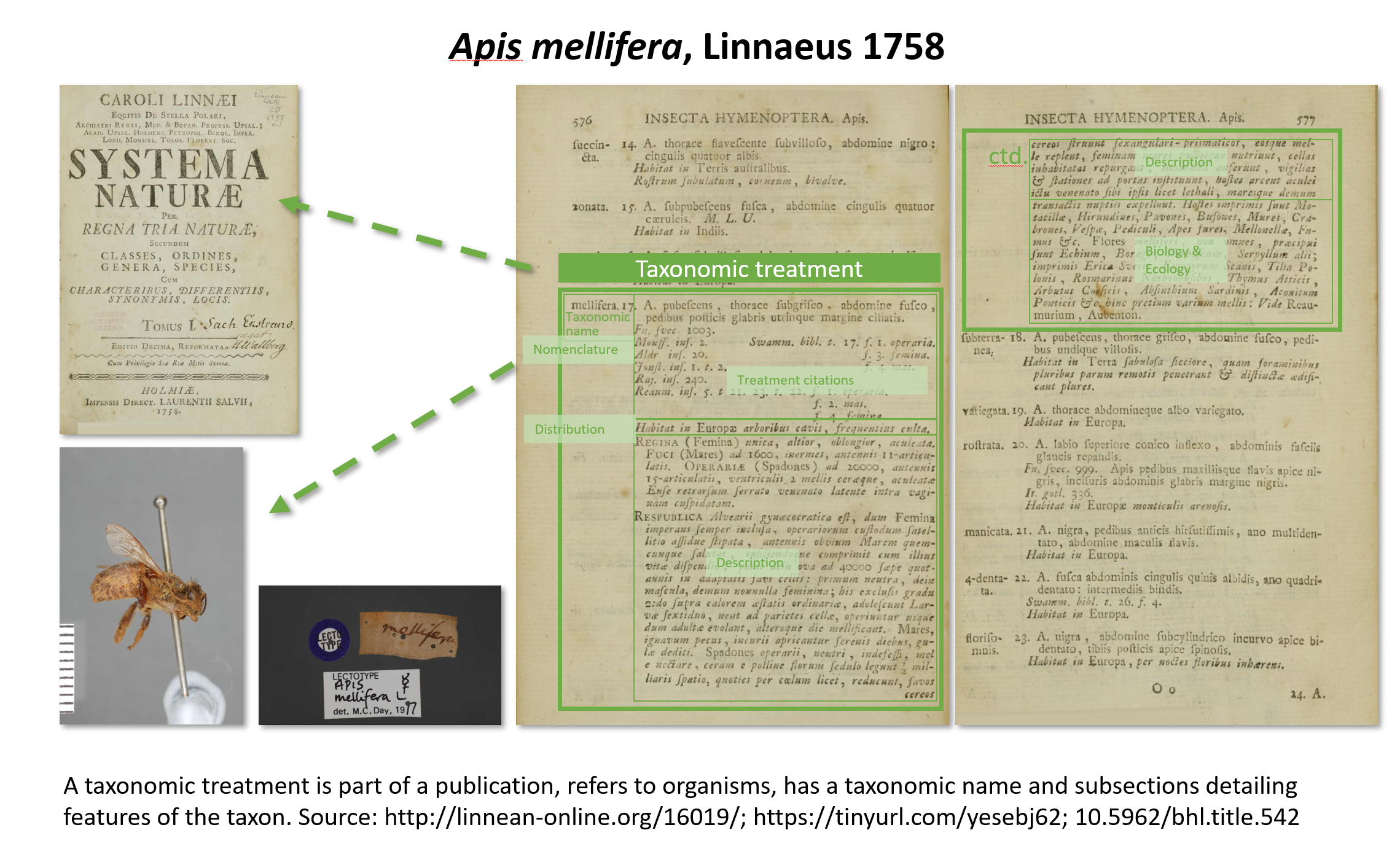
Taxonomic treatment of Apis mellifera, Linnaeus 1758

A taxonomic treatment is a section in a scientific publication documenting the features of a related group of organisms or taxa. Treatments have been the building blocks of how data about taxa are provided, ever since the beginning of modern taxonomy by Linnaeus 1753 for plants and 1758 for animals. Each scientifically described taxon has at least one taxonomic treatment. In today's publishing, a taxonomic treatment tag is used to delimit such a section. It allows to make this section findable, accessible, interoperable and reusable FAIR data. This is implemented in the Biodiversity Literature Repository, where upon deposition of the treatment a persistent DataCite digital object identifier (DOI) is minted. This includes metadata about the treatment, the source publication and other cited resources, such as figures cited in the treatment. This DOI allows a link from a taxonomic name usage to the respective scientific evidence provided by the author(s), both for human and machine consumption.

Treatments are considered data and thus copyright is not applicable and thus can be made available even from closed access publications.

== Etymology ==
The term taxonomic treatment has been coined because the term description has two meanings in species or taxonomic descriptions. One is equivalent to treatment, the second as subsection in treatments describing the taxon, complementing diagnosis, materials examined, distribution, conservation and other subsections.

== History ==
This term has been introduced during a national US NSF digital library project, and has been further developed into Taxpub, a taxonomy specific version of the Journal Article Tag Suite, by Plazi, the National Center for Biotechnology Information, and Pensoft Publishers. It was prototyped by the taxonomic journal ZooKeys, which adopted Taxpub from its volume 50 onwards, followed by PhytoKeys. Taxpub is now used by journals published by Pensoft Publishers, the European Journal of Taxonomy, the Consortium of European Taxonomic Facilities (CETAF), and the National Museum of Natural History, France. The TreatmentBank service maintained by Plazi to convert taxonomic publications into FAIR data provides access to over 500,000 taxonomic treatments, including over 7,700 treatments for new described species in 2020. They will eventually become accessible in BLR after passing quality control to avoid artifacts due to the complex conversion of unstructured, mainly PDF based publications.
