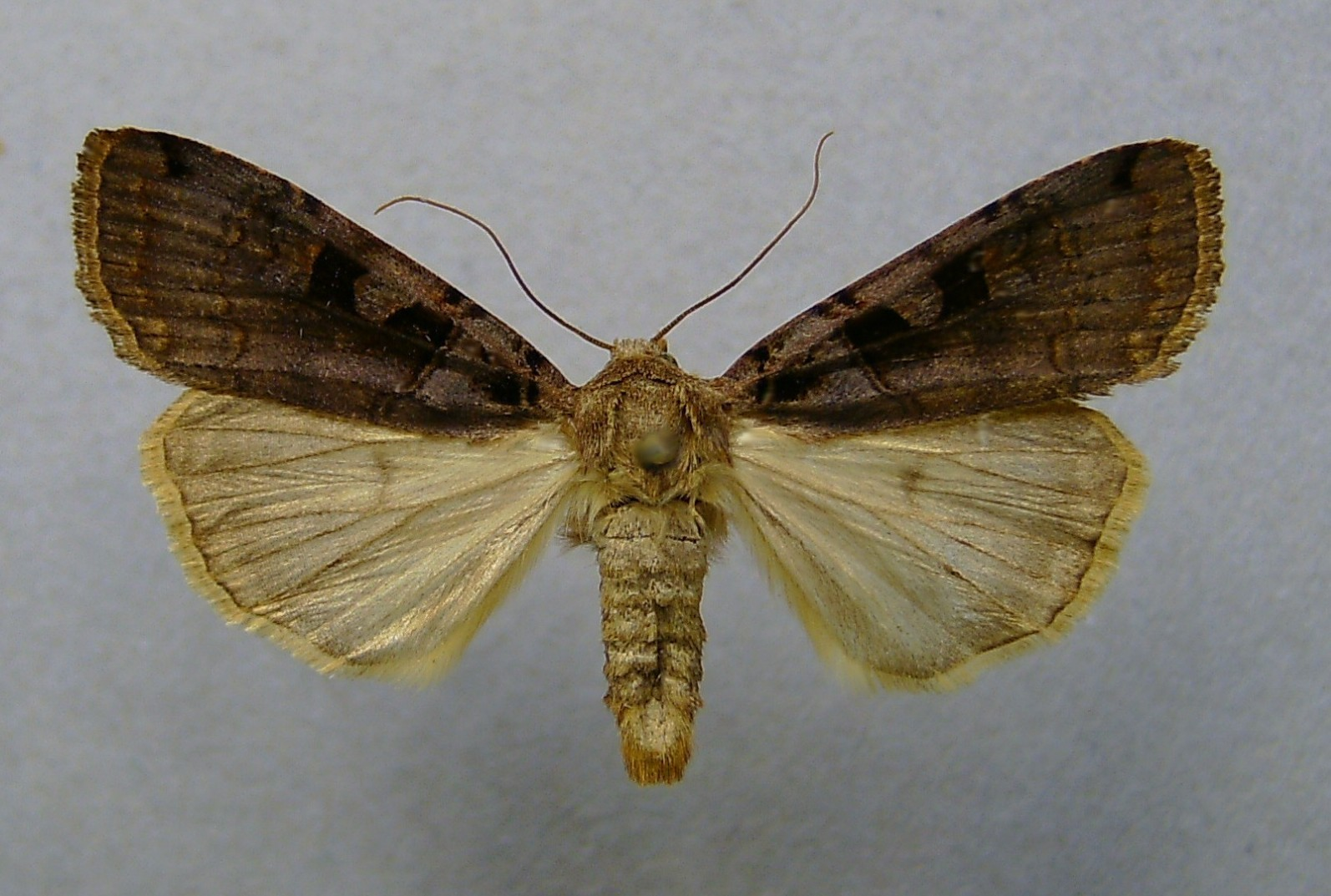

Scientific classification
- Domain: Eukaryota
- Kingdom: Animalia
- Phylum: Arthropoda
- Class: Insecta
- Order: Lepidoptera
- Superfamily: Noctuoidea
- Family: Noctuidae
- Genus: Xestia
- Species: X. ditrapezium

Binomial name
- Xestia ditrapezium (Denis & Schiffermüller, 1775)

Synonyms
- Noctua ditrapezium [Schiffermüller], 1775

= Xestia ditrapezium =

Triple-spotted clay

Species of moth

Xestia ditrapezium (triple-spotted clay) is a moth of the family Noctuidae found in most of Europe, northern Turkey, northern Iran, Transcaucasia, Caucasus, central Asia, from the Altai to Ussuri, Amur, Kuril Islands, northern Mongolia, Tibet, China, Korea, and Japan.

The wingspan is 35–47 mm. The forewing is darker than in Xestia triangulum Hufn., a smooth vinous brown; the dark markings are not so black; the hindwing is distinctly yellowish-tinged.

Differences from X. triangulum:

- X. ditrapezium forewings on average are narrower (or longer). The ground color of the forewings is usually darker (red to violet-brown) and the color of the rear wing is a shade lighter. The hindwings are significantly lighter than the forewings. The collar is without contrasts, almost monochrome.
- X. triangulum forewings on average are wider (or shorter). The ground color of the forewings is usually lighter (ochre to tawny or grayish brown); the color of the hindwings is usually slightly darker grey. The hindwings are about as light as the front wings. The lower part of the neck collar is grey, separated by a light line from the dark upper.

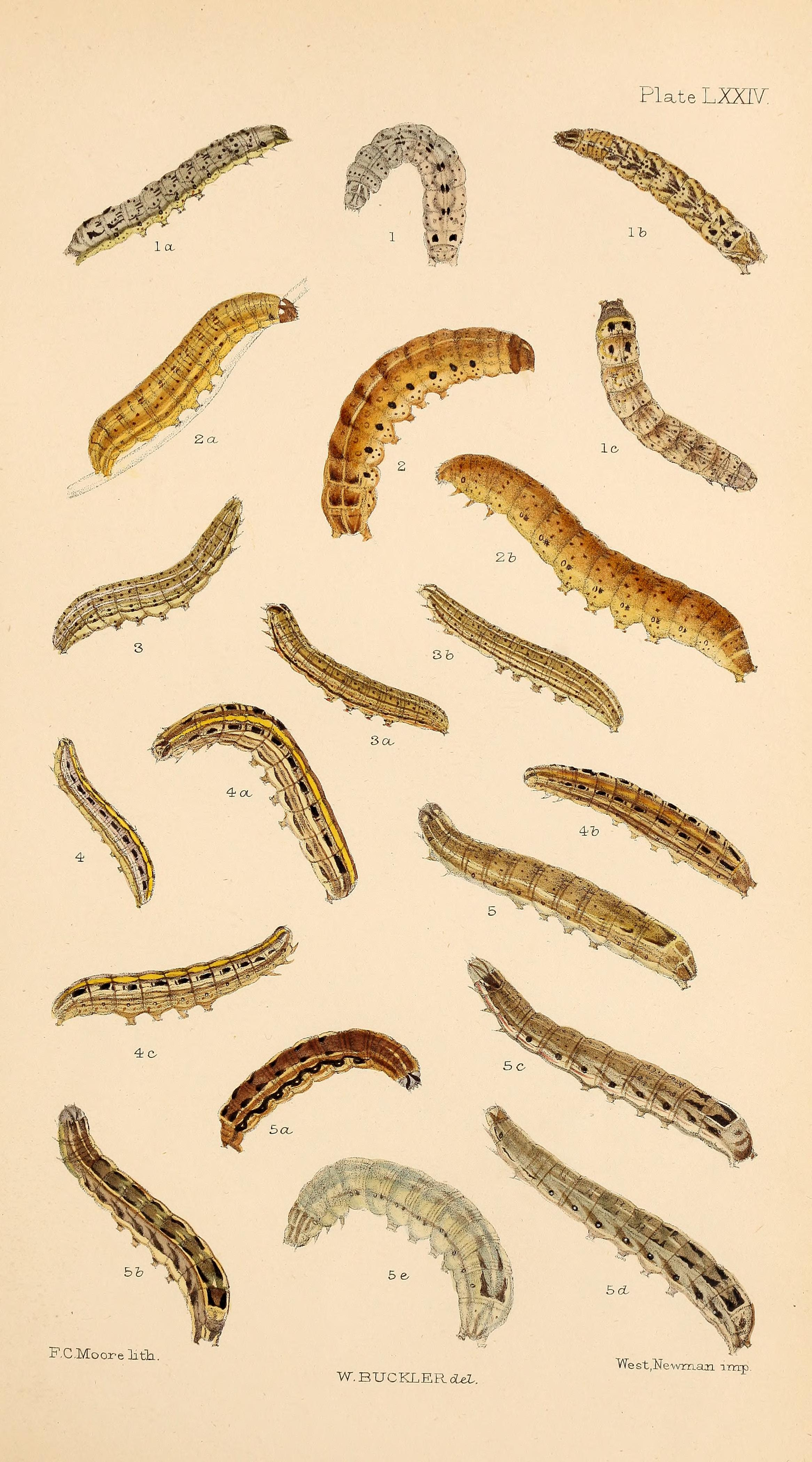
2, 2a, 2b, 2c larvae after final moult

== Biology ==
Adults are on wing from in July.

When they are small, the larvae overwinter while hibernating. After winter, they feed on various food plants, including Vaccinium myrtillus, Prunus spinosa, Salix, Alnus, Betula and Rubus (including Rubus idaeus).
