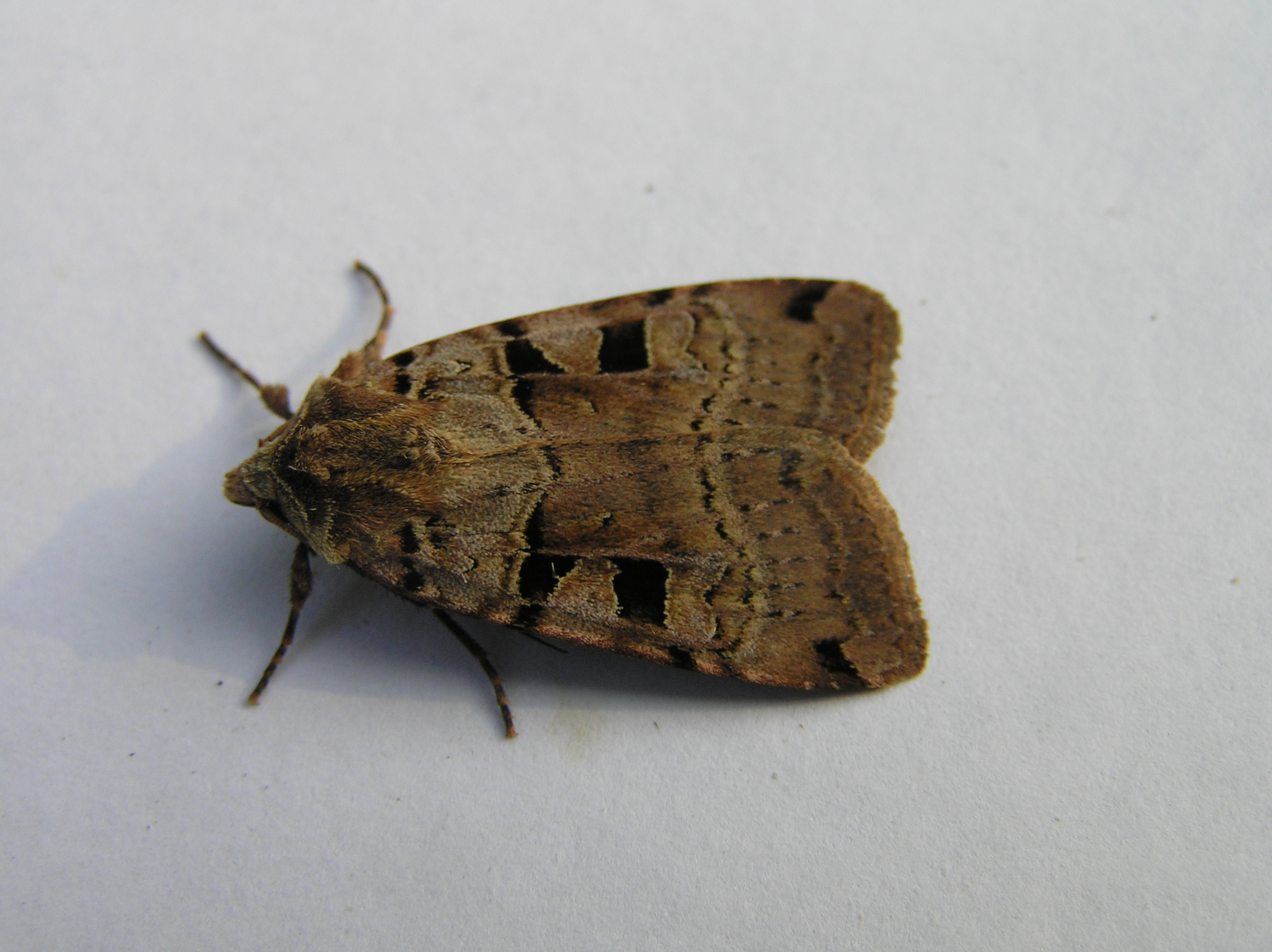

Scientific classification
- Domain: Eukaryota
- Kingdom: Animalia
- Phylum: Arthropoda
- Class: Insecta
- Order: Lepidoptera
- Superfamily: Noctuoidea
- Family: Noctuidae
- Genus: Xestia
- Species: X. triangulum

Binomial name
- Xestia triangulum (Hufnagel, 1766)

Synonyms
- Phalaena (Noctua) rhomboidea Esper, 1790; Xestia rhomboidea (Esper, 1790)

= Double square-spot =

Species of moth

The double square-spot (Xestia triangulum) is a moth of the family Noctuidae. It is distributed through most of Europe except the Mediterranean islands and northernmost Fennoscandia. In the East, the species ranges East across the Palearctic to Siberia and in the South-East to the Black Sea and in Iran. It rises to a height of about 2,000 metres (6,600 ft) in the Alps.

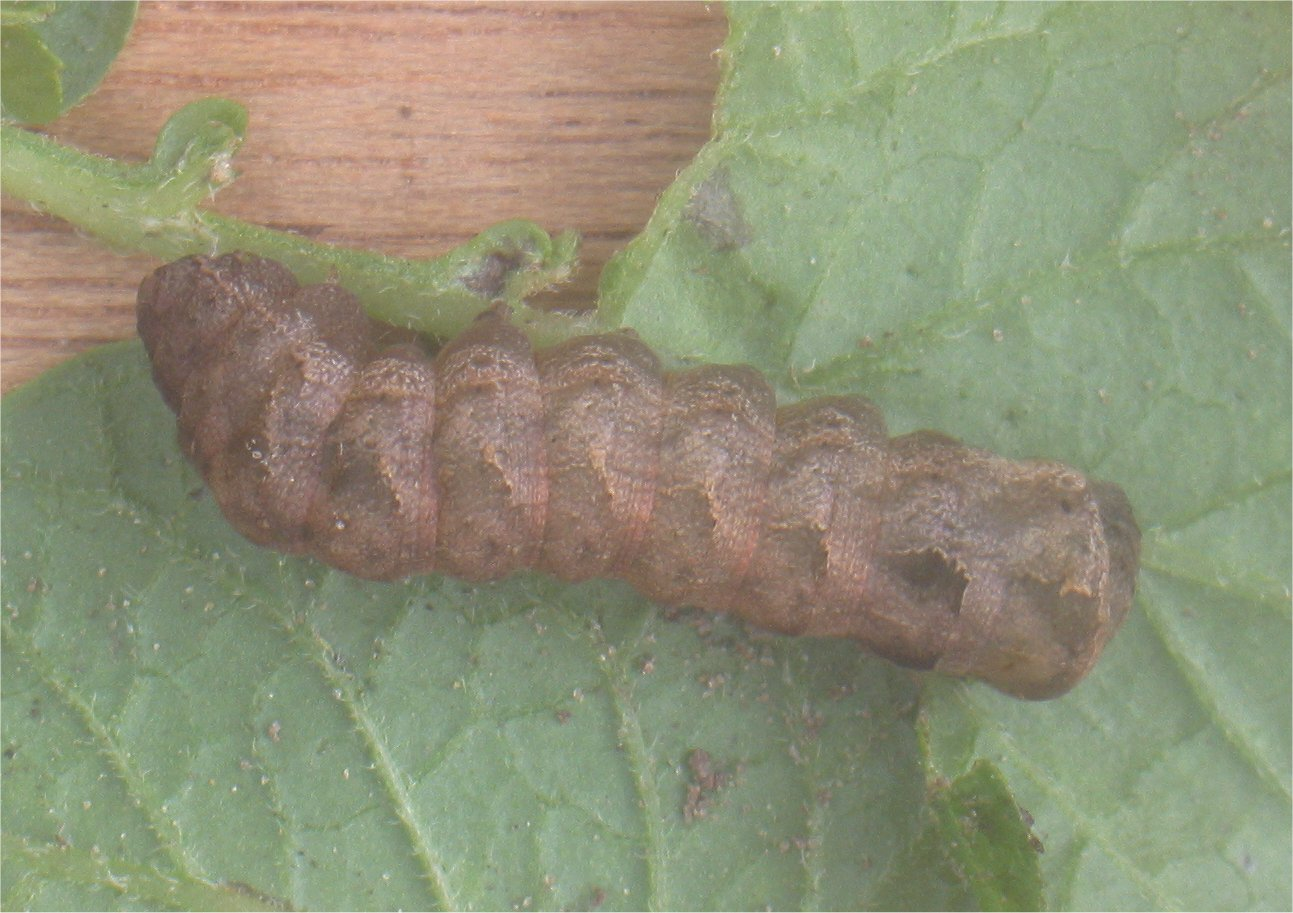
Caterpillar

This species has pale brown forewings marked with two distinctive black marks. Despite the common name, only one of these is square, the other being roughly triangular. The hindwings are similar in colour to the forewings. It is very similar to Xestia ditrapezium.

Differences:

- Xestia ditrapezium Front wing on average narrower (or longer). Ground colour of the forewings usually darker (red to violet-brown) and colour of the rear wing a shade lighter. Hindwings are significantly lighter than the forewings. Collar without contrasts, almost monochrome.
- Xestia triangulum Forewings average wider (or shorter). Ground colour of the forewings of usually lighter (ochre to tawny or grayish brown) colour of the hindwings usually slightly darker grey. Hindwings about as light as the front wings. Lower part of the neck collar grey, separated by a light line from the dark upper.

Technical description and variation: The wingspan is 36–46 mm (1.4–1.8 in). Forewing grey brown, with a rufous tinge: a small blotch at base, a preapical costal spot, and the cell prominently black brown; hindwing fuscous.

The moth flies at night in June and July in the British Isles. It is attracted to light and sugar and to flowers such as wood sage.

The larva is ochreous brown, black speckled; the lines pale; a row of oblique dark subdorsal bars. It is polyphagous, feeding on a wide variety of plants including birch, blackthorn, bramble, dock, hawthorn, raspberry and sallow. The species overwinters as a larva.

Inhabits preferably forest edges, slopes covered with shrubs, heaths and gardens and parkland.
