= AmphibiaWeb =

Database of amphibian species of the world

- Company type: Synthesizing and sharing information about amphibians to enable research, education, and conservation
- Industry: Herpetology
- Founded: 2000, California, United States
- Website: www.amphibiaweb.org

AmphibiaWeb is an American non-profit website that provides information about amphibians. It is run by a group of universities working with the California Academy of Sciences: San Francisco State University, the University of California at Berkeley, University of Florida at Gainesville, and University of Texas at Austin.

AmphibiaWeb's goal is to provide a single page for every species of amphibian in the world so research scientists, citizen scientists and conservationists can collaborate. It added its 7000th animal in 2012, a glass frog from Peru. As of 2022, it hosted more than 8,400 species located worldwide.

== Origins ==
Scientist David Wake founded AmphibiaWeb in 2000. Wake had been inspired by the decline of amphibian populations across the world. He founded it at the Digital Library Project at the University of California at Berkeley in 2000. Wake came to consider AmphibiaWeb part of his legacy.

== Uses ==
AmphibiaWeb provides information to the IUCN, CalPhotos, Encyclopedia of Life and iNaturalist, and the database is cited in scientific publications.
