= CalPhotos =

Online database

CalPhotos is an online database of natural history photographs, including many useful for identifying wildlife. It is maintained by the University of California, Berkeley. Its images are used by many universities, government agencies, websites, and others, including a partnership with the Encyclopedia of Life. Plant identifications are user-submitted, but a process for review and correction is available.
