= Darwin Core =

Standard for biodiversity information

Darwin Core (often abbreviated to DwC) is an extension of Dublin Core for biodiversity informatics. It is meant to provide a stable standard reference for sharing information on biological diversity (biodiversity). The terms described in this standard are a part of a larger set of vocabularies and technical specifications under development and maintained by Biodiversity Information Standards (TDWG) (formerly the Taxonomic Databases Working Group).

== Description ==
The Darwin Core is a body of standards intended to facilitate the sharing of information about biological diversity. The DwC includes a glossary of terms, and documentation providing reference definitions, examples, and commentary. An overview of the currently adopted terms and concepts can be found in the Darwin Core quick reference guide maintained by TDWG.

The DwC operational unit is primarily based on taxa, their occurrence in nature as documented by observations, specimens, and samples, and related information. Included in the standard are documents describing how these terms are managed, how the set of terms can be extended for new purposes, and how the terms can be used.

Each DwC term includes a definition and discussions meant to promote the consistent use of the terms across applications and disciplines. In other contexts, such terms might be called properties, elements, fields, columns, attributes, or concepts. Though the data types and constraints are not provided in the term definitions, recommendations are made about how to restrict the values where appropriate, for instance by suggesting the use of controlled vocabularies.

DwC standards are versioned and are constantly evolving, and working groups frequently add to the documentation practical examples that discuss, refine, and expand the normative definitions of each term. This approach to documentation allows the standard to adapt to new purposes without disrupting existing applications.

In practice, Darwin Core decouples the definition and semantics of individual terms from application of these terms in different technologies. Darwin Core provides separate guidelines on how to encode the terms as RDF, XML or text files.

The Simple Darwin Core is a specification for one particular way to use the terms and to share data about taxa and their occurrences in a simply-structured way. It is likely what is meant if someone were to suggest "formatting your data according to the Darwin Core".

== History ==
Darwin Core was originally created as a Z39.50 profile by the Z39.50 Biology Implementers Group (ZBIG), supported by funding from a USA National Science Foundation award. The name "Darwin Core" was first coined by Allen Allison at the first meeting of the ZBIG held at the University of Kansas in 1998 while commenting on the profile's conceptual similarity with Dublin Core. The Darwin Core profile was later expressed as an XML Schema document for use by the Distributed Generic Information Retrieval (DiGIR) protocol. A TDWG task group was created to revise the Darwin Core, and a ratified metadata standard was officially released on 9 October 2009.

Though ratified as a standard by Biodiversity Information Standards (TDWG) since then, Darwin Core has had numerous previous versions in production usage. The published standard contains a normative term list with the complete history of the versions of terms leading to the current standard.

Darwin Core versions
Name	Namespace	Number of terms	XML Schema	Date Issued
Darwin Core 1.0	Not Applicable	24	(Z39.50 GRS-1)	1998
Darwin Core 1.2 (Classic)	http://digir.net/schema/conceptual/darwin/2003/1.0/	46		2001-09-11
Darwin Core 1.21 (MaNIS/HerpNet/ORNIS/FishNet2)	http://digir.net/schema/conceptual/darwin/2003/1.0/	63		2003-03-15
Darwin Core OBIS	http://www.iobis.org/obis/	27		2005-07-10
Darwin Core 1.4 (Draft Standard)	http://rs.tdwg.org/dwc/dwcore/	46		2007-04-23
Darwin Core Standard	http://rs.tdwg.org/dwc/terms/	169		2009-10-09

== Key projects using Darwin Core ==
- The Global Biodiversity Information Facility (GBIF)
- The Ocean Biogeographic Information System (OBIS)
- The Atlas of Living Australia (ALA)
- Online Zoological Collections of Australian Museums (OZCAM)
- Mammal Networked Information System (MaNIS)
- Ornithological Information System (ORNIS)
- FishNet 2
- VertNet
- Canadensys
- Sistema Nature 3.0
- Encyclopedia of Life
- Integrated Digitized Biocollections (iDigBio)

== See also ==
- Darwin Core Archive
- Data Curation Network Simple Darwin Core for Non-Biologists Primer
