= Pan-European Species directories Infrastructure =

Creation of species checklist

The Pan-European Species-directories Infrastructure (PESI) provides a mechanism to deliver an integrated, annotated checklist of the species occurring in Europe, aiming to cover the Western Palearctic biogeographic region. PESI integrates the efforts of five community networks, Euro+Med PlantBase (E+M); Fauna Europaea (FaEu); the European Register of Marine Species (ERMS), and Species Fungorum Europe (SF-EU), into a single European checklist. The PESI checklist (also called EU-nomen) serves as a taxonomic standard and backbone for Europe.
