= Biodiversity Information Standards (TDWG) =

Non-profit scientific and educational association

- Formation: September 30, 1985; 41 years ago
- Founded at: Geneva, Switzerland
- Subsidiaries: TDWG Europe
- Website: www.tdwg.org
- Formerly called: Taxonomic Databases Working Group

Biodiversity Information Standards (TDWG), originally called the Taxonomic Databases Working Group, is a non-profit scientific and educational association that works to develop open standards for the exchange of biodiversity data, facilitating biodiversity informatics. It is affiliated with the International Union of Biological Sciences. It is best known for the Darwin Core standard for exchanging biodiversity, which has been used by the Global Biodiversity Information Facility to collect millions of biological observations from museums and other organizations from around the world.

== History ==
TDWG was founded in 1985 as the Taxonomic Databases Working Group; the first meeting took place on September 28–30, 1985, at the Geneva Botanical Garden in Switzerland. The organisation was formed as an international collaboration to promote the wider and more effective dissemination of information about biological organisms. Its name was changed to Taxonomic Databases Working Group for Plant Sciences in 1986. It was accepted as a commission of the International Union of Biological Sciences in October 1988. The name changed to International Working Group on Taxonomic Databases for Plant Sciences in 1988. Initially focusing on plant taxonomic databases, in 1994 it expanded its scope to cover all taxonomic databases and changed its name to International Working Group on Taxonomic Databases.

In 2006 the group decided to change their name to emphasise their focus was on standards for sharing biodiversity data, rather than on taxonomy or the databases themselves. However, they wished to retain TDWG for historical continuity, so the name became Biodiversity Information Standards (TDWG).

== Activities ==
TDWG organises an annual meeting for its members. The organization was founded at the first meeting in Geneva in 1985.

The association currently:

1. Develops, adopts, and promotes standards and guidelines for the recording, discovery, exchange, and integration of data about organisms,
2. Promotes the use of these standards and guidelines through the most appropriate and effective means, and
3. Acts as a forum for discussion about biodiversity informatics standards

This organization publishes conference proceedings in the Biodiversity Information Science and Standards (BISS), published by Pensoft.
