= Fauna Europaea =

Database of European land and fresh-water animals

Fauna Europaea is a database of the scientific names and distribution of all living multicellular European land and fresh-water animals. It serves as a standard taxonomic source for animal taxonomy within the Pan-European Species directories Infrastructure (PESI). As of June 2020, Fauna Europaea reported that their database contained 235,708 taxon names and 173,654 species names.

Its construction was initially funded by the European Commission (2000–2004). The project was co-ordinated by the University of Amsterdam which launched the first version in 2004. The Museum für Naturkunde Berlin took over the hosting of the web portal in 2013, and a new web portal was launched in 2015.
