= Rebecca Adler-Nissen =

Danish political scientist

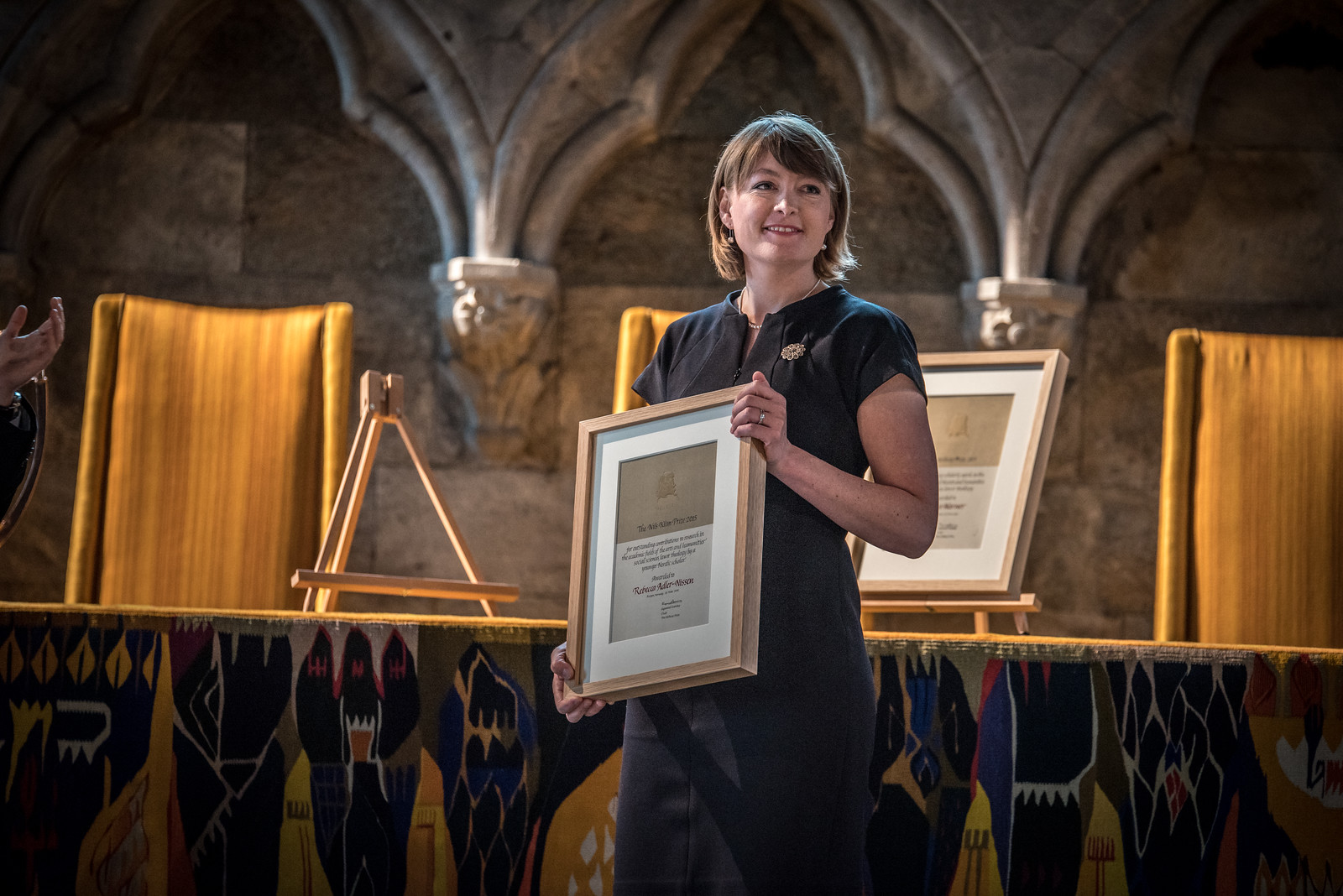
- Born: Gentofte
- Education: University of Copenhagen; Institut d'Etudes Politiques
- Known for: International Politics; European Integration
- Scientific career
- Fields: Political science
- Institutions: University of Copenhagen; Ministry of Foreign Affairs of Denmark
- Website: Personal website

Rebecca Adler-Nissen is a Danish political scientist professor in the department of political science at the University of Copenhagen. She specializes in international politics with a particular focus on the European Union, European integration, diplomacy, digital technology, geopolitics, and the regulation of artificial intelligence. She is director of the National Center for AI in Society (CAISA)

== Early life and education ==
Adler-Nissen studied at the University of Copenhagen, obtaining a BA in political science in 2002. She then earned a diploma at the Institut d'Etudes Politiques, before returning to the University of Copenhagen where she earned an MSc in 2005 and a PhD in 2009. She has held visiting appointments at institutions including the European University Institute, McGill University, and the University of Sydney.

== Career ==
In 2010–2011, Adler-Nissen was Head of Section at the Ministry of Foreign Affairs of Denmark. From 2012-2017, she was a member of the Young Academy of Denmark, a scientific academy for young researchers within the Royal Danish Academy of Sciences and Letters. She was subsequently admitted as a member of the Royal Danish Academy of Sciences and Letters.

In 2015, Adler-Nissen was awarded the Nils Klim Prize, which is awarded annually by the government of Norway "to a scholar under the age of 35, from a Nordic country, for outstanding contributions to research in the humanities, social sciences, law or theology". In 2019, she won the EliteForsk Prize, which the Danish Council for Independent Research awards every year to five scholars under the age of 45 who are judged to be outstanding researchers of international acclaim.

Adler-Nissen's research has been noted for incorporating sociological and behavioral insights into the study of international relations within the European system, in contrast to the rationalist approach that had predominantly been used in that area. She received the Nils Klim Prize partly for work investigating diplomatic negotiations through anthropological field work and interview methods.

== Other activities ==
- European Council on Foreign Relations, Member

== Selected awards ==
- Member, Young Academy of Denmark (2012-17)
- Member, Royal Danish Academy of Sciences and Letters (since 2017)
- Nils Klim Prize (2015)
- EliteForsk Prize (2019)
