= EliteForsk Prize =

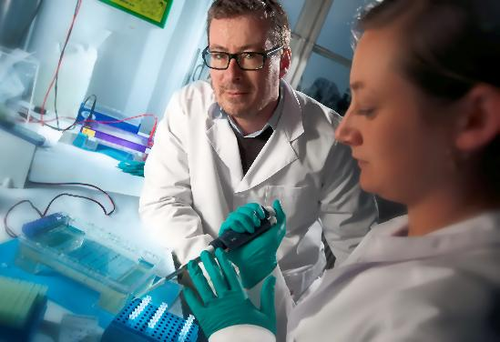
Eske Willerslev, one of the awardees.

The EliteForsk Prize (Danish EliteForsk-prisen) is the most prestigious award given by the Danish Council for Independent Research, of the Danish Ministry of Higher Education and Science. The award of 1.2 million Danish krone honors outstanding researchers of international acclaim, who are under 45 years of age, and is currently awarded to five individuals annually.

== Recipients ==
Year	EliteForsk Prize Recipients						
2007	Claus Hviid Christensen	Dan Zahavi	Klaus Mølmer	Rasmus Nielsen	Søren Nielsen		
2008	Morten Bennedsen	Vincent F. Hendricks	Jens Hjorth	Poul Nissen	Ole Sigmund	Bo Thamdrup	Leif Østergaard
2009	Bjørk Hammer	Marie-Louise Bech Nosch	Ole Nørregaard Jensen	Frank Møller Aarestrup			
2010	Lars Arge	Adrian Favell	Kurt Vesterager Gothelf	Carsten Rahbek	Francesco Sannino		
2011	Lene Hansen	Bo Brummerstedt Iversen	Søren Riis Paludan	Jesper Ryberg	Eske Willerslev		
2012	Anja Boisen	Hans Bräuner-Osborne	Frederik C. Krebs	Matthias Kriesell	Peter Norman Sørensen		
2013	Claudia Welz	Morten Nielsen	Ove Christiansen	Steen Hannestad	Ulrik Lund Andersen		
2014	Daniel Otzen	Martin Røssel Larsen	Jens-Christian Svenning	Morten Petersen Broberg	Mads Brandbyge		
2015	Lars Birkedal	Lasse Heje Pedersen	Lene Broeng Oddershede	Niels Mailand	Rubina Raja		
2016	David Dreyer Lassen	Peter Lodahl	Liv Hornekær	Petar Popovski	Mette Ramsgaard Thomsen		
2017	Thomas Lars Andresen	Hanne Christine Bertram	Søren Galatius	Klaus Høyer	Mikael Rask Madsen		
2018	Robert A. Fenton	Søren Fournais	Anja Groth	Stig Helveg	N. Asger Mortensen		
2019	Rebecca Adler-Nissen	Chunaram Choudhary	Niels Jessen	Peter Teglberg Madsen	Kristian Sommer Thygesen		
2020	Sine Reker Hadrup	Mads Meier Jæger	Anders Møller	Tobias Richter	Riikka Rinnan		
2021	Eva Boxenbaum	Anders Engberg-Pedersen	Emil Loldrup Fosbøl	Gemma Clare Solomon Larsen	Signe Normand		
2022	Anne Ladegaard Skov	Anton Pottegård	Felix Riede	Naja Hulvej Rod	Sune Lehmann		
2023	Per Borghammer	Alexander Kai Büll	Poul Fritz Kjær	Eline Lorenzen	Dorthe B. Ravnsbæk		
