= Rubina Raja =

Professor of Classical Archaeology at Aarhus University

Academic background
- Education: University of Copenhagen; Lincoln College. Oxford
- Thesis: Urban development and regional identity in the eastern Roman provinces, 50 BC – AD 250: Aphrodisias, Ephesos, Athens, Gerasa
- Doctoral advisor: R.R.R. Smith, Margareta Steinby

Academic work
- Discipline: Classical archaeology
- Institutions: Aarhus University

Rubina Raja is a classical archaeologist educated at University of Copenhagen (Denmark), La Sapienza University (Rome) and University of Oxford (England). She is professor (chair) of classical archaeology at Aarhus University and centre director of the Danish National Research Foundation's Centre of Excellence for Urban Network Evolutions (UrbNet). She specialises in the cultural, social and religious archaeology and history of past societies. Research foci include urban development and network studies, architecture and urban planning, the materiality of religion as well as iconography from the Hellenistic to early medieval periods. Her publications include articles, edited volumes and monographs on historiography, ancient portraiture and urban archaeology as well as themes in the intersecting fields between humanities and natural sciences. Rubina Raja received her DPhil degree from the University of Oxford in 2005 (Lincoln College) with a thesis on urban development and regional identities in the eastern Roman provinces under the supervision of Professors R.R.R. Smith and Margareta Steinby. Thereafter, she held a post-doctoral position at Hamburg University, Germany, before she in 2007 moved to a second post-doctoral position at Aarhus University, Denmark. In 2011–2016, she was a member of the Young Academy of Denmark, where she was elected chairwoman in 2013.

== Career ==
Rubina Raja has since 2007 been the principal investigator and director of several research projects, many of them interdisciplinary. Since 2015, she directs Centre for Urban Network Evolutions based at Aarhus University, which is the largest research initiative within the humanities in Denmark. The centre has pioneered work on urban development, high definition archaeology and network studies of societies from the late Hellenistic into the medieval periods geographically covering regions from Northern Europe, across the Mediterranean to the East Coast of Africa.

Rubina Raja directs two fieldwork projects together with international colleagues. Since 2011 she has directed the Danish-German Jerash Northwest Quarter Project together with professor Dr. Achim Lichtenberger from Münster University and since 2017 she directs the Danish-Italian Caesar's Forum Project in Rome together with Dr. Jan Kindberg Jacobsen (The Danish Institute in Rome) and Dr. Claudio Presecce Parisi (Sovrintendenza Capitolina ai Beni Culturali, Direzione Musei archeologici e storico-artistici, Rome, Italy).

Rubina Raja is the primary investigator and director of the Palmyra Portrait Project that compiles a corpus of the funerary portraiture from Palmyra. Since 2012, the project has collected and catalogued more than 4000 pieces, which will be the basis for the research carried out within two new research projects, Archive Archaeology and Circular Economy and Urban Sustainability in Antiquity. The Case of Palmyra.

Rubina Raja is a member of the Royal Danish Academy of Sciences and Letters as well as the Academia Europaea. She is an elected corresponding member of the German Archaeological Institute and the Archaeological Institute of America.

Rubina Raja's research has earned several national and international distinctions within and outside her field, among these the Friedrich Wilhelm von Bessel Research Award from the Humboldt Foundation in 2022 and the Queen Margrethe IIs rome Prize in 2021. She has also received the silver medal for outstanding research within the humanities from the Royal Danish Academy of Sciences and Letters as well as the Elite Research Prize (EliteForsk) and the National Research Prize for outstanding research within the humanities and social sciences awarded by Dansk Magisterforening. She has also received international acclaims from the Max Planck Institute in Germany and the American Institute for Archaeology.

Rubina Raja engages actively in outreach initiatives and in communicating her research within the humanities and about the importance of humanities widely to the general public and policy makers in publications, radio-interviews and programmes, podcasts, television and documentaries, as well as online lectures. She has curated several exhibitions, among others Harald Ingholt og Palmyra and Jerash – et dansk-tysk udgravningsprojekt at the Museum of Ancient Art (Aarhus University), and The Road to Palmyra at the Ny Carlsberg Glyptotek. Rubina Raja also acted as one of the head consultants on the featured exhibition Palmyra – Loss and Remembrance at the Getty Villa (J. Paul Getty Museum).

Rubina Raja studied Classical Archaeology, Italian language, Cultural Communication and Journalism at the University of Copenhagen in from 1995 to 1999. She spent the academic year 1997–1998 as an exchange student at the Universitá di Roma, La Sapienza. She continued her studies at the University of Oxford, where she gained her M.St. in Classical Archaeology. In 2005, she received her D.Phil. in Classical Archaeology from the University of Oxford (Lincoln College). Her dissertation was entitled Urban development and regional identity in the eastern Roman provinces, 50 BC – AD 250: Aphrodisias, Ephesos, Athens, Gerasa and was supervised by R.R.R. Smith and Margareta Steinby. It was published as a monograph in 2012. As further education within the fields of research and management organisation Rubina Raja studied for a Diploma of Management (Forvaltningshøjskolen, Copenhagen; VIA University College, Aarhus (2008–2010) and joined an Executive Research Management Course (Copenhagen Business School, 2015). She is committed to furthering professional leadership in the university world as well as dedicated to furthering the careers of female scholars and academics in particular.

== Research projects ==
=== Current funded research projects ===
- 2024– Principal investigator of The Aarhus-Yale Digital Archive Platform for the Danish Inter-World War Archaeological Engagement in the Middle East (Carlsberg Foundation).
- 2022–2024 Partner to the Joint Committee for Nordic Research Councils in the Humanities and Social Sciences (NOS-HS) exploratory workshops grant Writing Histories of the Ancient Near East: 21st Century Challenges (NordForsk).
- 2020– Director of the collective research project Circular Economy and Urban Sustainability in Antiquity. The Case of Palmyra (Funded by the Augustinus Foundation and the Carlsberg Foundation).
- 2015– Director of the Danish National Research Foundation's Centre of Excellence, Centre for Urban Network Evolutions (UrbNet), Aarhus University, Denmark.

=== Former research projects ===
- 2017–2023 co-director of the Danish-Italian project Excavation of the Forum of Julius Caesar in Rome together with Dr. Jan Kindberg Jacobsen, The Danish Institute in Rome and Dr. Claudio Presecce Parisi, director of the Soprintendenza, Direzione Musei archeologici e storico-artistici, Rome, Italy (Funded by the Carlsberg Foundation since 2017 and Aarhus University Research Foundation since 2019).
- 2020–2023 Director of the collective research project Archive Archaeology (Funded by the ALIPH Foundation).
- 2011–2021 Principal investigator and director of the international excavation project The Danish-German Jerash Northwest Quarter Project in Jerash, Jordan, together with Prof. Dr. Achim Lichtenberger, Westfälische Wilhelmsuniversität Münster (Funded by the Carlsberg Foundation, German Research Council (DFG), H.P. Hjerl Hansens Mindefondet for Dansk Palæstinaforskning, German Society for the Exploration of Palestine, Centre for Urban Network Evolutions and EliteForsk).
- 2012–2020 Principal investigator and director of the Palmyra Portrait Project (Funded by the Carlsberg Foundation).
- 2018–2019 Partner to the Joint Committee for Nordic Research Councils in the Humanities and Social Sciences (NOS-HS) exploratory workshops grant Globalization, Urbanization and Urban Religion in the Eastern Mediterranean in the Roman and Early Islamic periods.
- 2015–2020 Principal investigator of the collective research project Ceramics in Context (Funded by the Carlsberg Foundation, Copenhagen, Denmark).
- 2012–2017 External Co-principal investigator and co-director of the ERC Advanced Grant project Lived Ancient Religion, directed by Prof. Dr. Jörg Rüpke, Max-Weber-Kolleg, Universität Erfurt, Germany.
- 2009–2012 Co-principal investigator of the project Transformation of religious identity in the Hellenistic-Roman World, 100 BC – AD 600: The significance of conversion and initiation to the formation of religious identity, together with Prof. Anders-Christian Lund Jacobsen, Theology, Aarhus University (Funded by the Velux Foundation).
- 2007–2012 Principal investigator and director of the project Religious identity, ritual practice and sacred architecture in the Late Hellenistic and Roman period: the role of the sanctuaries between culture, religion and society(research grant from the Novo Nordisk Foundation).

== Selected editorial responsibilities ==
- 2021– Editorial board member of the peer-reviewed journal Journal of Eastern Mediterranean Archaeology and Heritage Studies, published by The Pennsylvania State University Press, Pennsylvania.
- 2021– Founder and editor of the peer-reviewed series Urban Archaeological Pasts together with Prof. Michael E. Smith and Prof. Søren M. Sindbæk, published by Cambridge University Press, Cambridge.
- 2021– Editorial board member of the peer-reviewed journal Journal of Field Archaeology, published by Taylor & Francis.
- 2021– Founder and editor of the peer-reviewed series Women of the Past together with Associate Professor Nina J. Koefoed, published by Brepols Publishers, Turnhout.
- 2021– Founder and editor of the peer-reviewed series Archive Archaeology, published by Brepols Publishers, Turnhout.
- 2020– Scientific board member of the journal Rivista di Studi Pompeiani, Pompei/Rome, Italy.
- 2019– Founder and editor of the peer-reviewed journal Journal of Urban Archaeology together with Prof. Dr. Søren M. Sindbæk, published by Brepols, Turnhout.
- 2019– Founder and editor of the peer-reviewed series Rome Studies: Archaeology, History and Literature together with Dr. Trine Arlund Hass, published by Brepols, Turnhout.
- 2019– Founder and editor of the peer-reviewed series Studies in Palmyrene Archaeology and History, published by Brepols, Turnhout.
- 2019– Advisory board member of the peer-reviewed series Ritual in the Ancient Mediterranean, Routledge.
- 2018– Editorial scientific committee member for the journal ARYS (Antigüedad, Religiones y Sociedades).
- 2017– Founder and editor of the peer-reviewed series Mediterranean Studies in Antiquity published by Cambridge University Press, Cambridge.
- 2016– Founder and editor of the peer-reviewed series Studies in Classical Archaeology together with Prof. Dr. Achim Lichtenberger, Westfälische Wilhelms-Universität Münster, published by Brepols, Turnhout.
- 2016– Founder and editor of the peer-reviewed series Jerash Papers together with Prof. Dr. Achim Lichtenberger, Westfälische Wilhelms-Universität Münster, published by Brepols, Turnhout.
- 2015– Editorial board member of the peer-reviewed international journal Religion in the Roman Empire published by Mohr-Siebeck, Tübingen.
- 2015– Founder and editor of the peer-reviewed series Palmyrenske Studier published by the Royal Danish Academy of Sciences and Letters, Copenhagen.
- 2013– Founder and editor of the peer-reviewed series Contextualizing the Sacred together with Dr. Elizabeth Frood, University of Oxford, England published by Brepols, Turnhout.

== Honours ==
- 2022 Friedrich Wilhelm-Bessel Forschungspreis, Alexander von Humboldt Stiftung, Germany
- 2021 Her Majesty Queen Margrethe's Rome Prize awarded by the Carlsberg Foundation, Copenhagen, Denmark.
- 2019 National Research Prize awarded by the Dansk Magisterforening for outstanding research in the humanities and social sciences.
- 2018–2019 Appointed Kershaw Lecturer by the Archaeological Institute of America.
- 2015 Awarded the EliteForsk Prize by the Danish Research Council and Ministry of Higher Education and Science.
- 2015 Tagea Brandts Award for female researchers.
- 2015 Appointed distinguished lecturer in the Human Sciences, Max Planck Institute, Berlin, Germany.
- 2014 Silver medal awarded by the Royal Danish Academy of Sciences and Letters, Copenhagen, Denmark for outstanding research in the humanities and social sciences.

== Selected publications ==
Full list of publications available at Aarhus University, Rubina Raja: Research Outputs.

=== Monographs ===
- Raja, R. (2019). The Palmyra Collection: Ny Carlsberg Glyptotek, Copenhagen: Ny Carlsberg Glyptotek.
- Krag, S., Raja, R.& Yon, J.-B. (2019). The collection of Palmyrene funerary portraits in the Musei Vaticani. Notes and observations. Bollettino dei monumenti musei e gallerie pontificie. Supplemento n. 4, Vatican: Edizioni Musei Vaticani.
- Raja, R. & Sørensen, A. H. (2015). Harald Ingholt and Palmyra, Aarhus: Fællestrykkeriet Aarhus Universitet. Danish translation: Harald Ingholt og Palmyra, Aarhus: Fællestrykkeriet Aarhus Universitet.
- Raja, R. (2012). Urban Development and Regional Identity in the Eastern Roman Provinces, 50 BC – AD 250: Aphrodisias, Ephesos, Athens, Gerasa, Copenhagen: Museum Tusculanum Press.

=== Selected recent articles ===
- Albertson, F., Lapatin, K. & Raja, R. (2019). "Rejoining a Palmyrene Funerary Relief: Postscriptum", Zeitschrift für Orient-Archäologie 12, 168–183.
- Albrecht, J., Degelmann, C., Gasparini, V., Gordon, R., Patzelt, M., Petridou, G., Raja, R., Rieger, A.-K., Rüpke, J., Sippel, B., Urciuoli, E. R. & Weiss, L. (2018). "Religion in the making: the Lived Ancient Religion Approach"; Religion 38:4, 568–593.
- Barfod, G., Freestone, I., Lichtenberger, A., Raja, R. & Schwarzer, H. (2018). "Geochemistry of Byzantine and Early Islamic glass from Jerash, Jordan: Typology, recycling, and provenance", Geoarchaeology 33:6, 1–18.
- Hoffmann Barfod, Gry; Larsen, John Møller; Lichtenberger, Achim; Raja, Rubina (9 December 2015). "Revealing text in a complexly rolled silver scroll from Jerash with computed tomography and advanced imaging software". Scientific Reports. 5 (1) 17765. Bibcode:2015NatSR...517765H. doi:10.1038/srep17765. PMC 4673433. PMID 26648504.
- Barfod, G., Lichtenberger, A., Peterson, A., Raja, R. & Ting, C. (2019). "Middle Islamic Pottery from Jerash: New Research on Ceramic Fabrics and the Implications for Production Patterns of HMGP Pottery in Northern Jordan", Zeitschrift für Orient-Archäologie 12, 140–167.
- Birch, T., Orfanou, V., Lichtenberger, A., Raja, R., Barfod, G., Lesher, C.E., Schulze, I. & Schulze, W. (2019). "From nummi minimi to fulūs—small change and wider issues: Characterising coinage from Gerasa/Jerash (Late Roman to Umayyad periods)", Archaeological and Anthropological Sciences.
- Gordon, R., Lichtenberger, A. & Raja, R. (2017). "A new inscribed amulet from Gerasa (Jerash)", Syria 94, 297–306.
- Holdridge, G., Kristiansen, S. M., Raja, R. & Simpson, I. A. (2017). " City and wadi: Exploring the environs of Jerash", Antiquity 91, 1–6.
- Kaizer, T. & Raja, R. (2019). "Divine symbolism on the tesserae from Palmyra: Considerations about the so-called 'Symbol of Bel' or 'Signe de la Pluie'", Syria 95, 297–315.
- Kalaitzoglou, G., Lichtenberger, A. & Raja, R. (2018). " Preliminary report of the fourth season of the Danish-German Jerash Northwest Quarter Project 2014", Annual of the Department of Antiquities in Jordan 59, 11–43.
- Krag, S. & Raja, R. (2017). "Representations of women and children in Palmyrene banqueting reliefs and sarcophagus scenes", Zeitschrift für Orient-Archäologie 10, 196–227.
- Krag, S. & Raja, R. (2019). " Unveiling female hairstyles: Markers of Age, Social Roles, and Status in the Funerary Sculpture from Palmyra", Zeitschrift für Orient-Archäologie 2018:11, 242–277.
- Lichtenberger, A. & Raja, R. (2015), "New archaeological research in the Northwest Quarter of Jerash and its implications for the urban development of Roman Gerasa", American Journal of Archaeology 119:4, 483–500.
- Lichtenberger, A. &Raja, R. (2016). "A newly excavated private house in Jerash: Reconsidering aspects of continuity and change in material culture from Late Antiquity to the early Islamic period", Antiquité Tardive 24, 317–359.
- Lichtenberger, Achim; Raja, Rubina (8 August 2017). "Mosaicists at work: the organisation of mosaic production in Early Islamic Jerash". Antiquity. 91 (358): 998–1010. doi:10.15184/aqy.2017.66.
- Lichtenberger, A. & Raja, R. (2018). "From Synagogue to Church: The Appropriation of the Synagogue of Gerasa/Jerash under Justinian", Jahrbuch für Antike und Christentum 61, 85–98.
- Lichtenberger, A. & Raja, R. (2019). "18. Januar 749 n. Chr – Ein Erdbeben zerstört die Stadt Gerasa in Jordanien", Antike Welt 1:2019, 4.
- Lichtenberger, A. & Raja, R. (2019). "Management of water resources over time in semiarid regions: The case of Gerasa/Jerash in Jordan", WIREs Water, e1403
- Lichtenberger, A. & Raja, R. (2019). " Open-data presentation of a geophysical survey in Gerasa (Jerash), Jordan", Antiquity 93:371, e31.
- Lichtenberger, A. & Raja, R. (2019). "The Danish-German Jarash North-West Quarter Project: Results from the 2014–2015 seasons", Studies in the History and Archaeology of Jordan XIII, 51–71.
- Lichtenberger, A., Raja, R., Eger, C., Kalaitzoglou, G. & Sørensen, A. H. (2017). "A newly excavated private house in Jerash. Reconsidering aspects of continuity and change in material culture from Late Antiquity to the early Islamic period", Antiquité Tardive 24, 317–359.
- Lichtenberger, Achim; Raja, Rubina; Seland, Eivind Heldaas; Kinnaird, Tim; Simpson, Ian A. (25 June 2019). "Urban-Riverine Hinterland Synergies in Semi-Arid Environments: Millennial-Scale Change, Adaptations, and Environmental Responses at Gerasa/Jerash". Journal of Field Archaeology. 44 (5): 333–351. doi:10.1080/00934690.2019.1625619. hdl:10023/18069.
- Lichtenberger, A., Raja, R. & Stott, D. (2019). "Mapping Gerasa: A new and open data map of the site", Antiquity 93:367, 1–7.
- Lichtenberger, A., Raja, R. & Sørensen, A. H. (2018). "The Danish-German Jerash Northwest Quarter Project 2014: Preliminary registration report", Annual of the Department of Antiquities in Jordan 59, 45–131.
- Lichterman, P., Raja, R., Rieger, A.-K. & Rüpke, J. (2017). "Grouping together in Lived Ancient Religion: Individual Interacting and the formation of groups", Religion in the Roman Empire3, 3–10.
- Raja, R. (2016). "In and out of contexts: Explaining religious complexity through the banqueting tesserae from Palmyra", Religion in the Roman Empire 2:3, 340–371.
- Raja, R. (2017). "Powerful images of the deceased: Palmyrene funerary portrait culture between local, Greek and Roman representations", in: Boschung, D. & Queyrel, F. (eds.), Bilder der Macht: Das griechische Porträt und seine Verwendung in der antiken Welt, Paderborn: Wilhelm Fink, 319–348.
- Raja, R. (2017)."Representations of the so-called 'former priests' in Palmyrene funerary art. A methodological contribution and commentary", Topoi Orient Occident 21:1, 51–81.
- Raja, R. (2017). "Zeus Olympios, Hadrian and the Jews of Antiochia-on-the-Chrysorrhoas-formerly-called-Gerasa", Studies in Mediterranean Archaeology PB185, 171–195.
- Raja, R. (2018). "Compilation and digitisation of the Palmyrene corpus of funerary portraits", Antiquity92:365, 1–7.
- Raja, R. (2018). "The matter of the Palmyrene 'modius'. Remarks on the history of research into the terminology of the Palmyrene priestly hat", Religion in the Roman Empire 4, 237–259.
- Raja, R. (2018). "Urbanising the Desert. Investigating the diversity of urban networks through the images of deceased Palmyrenes", in: Raja, R. & Sindbæk, S. M. (eds.), Urban Network Evolutions: Towards a high-definition archaeology, Aarhus: Aarhus University Press, 75–80.
- Raja, R. (2019). "Reconsidering the dorsalium or 'Curtain of Death' in Palmyrene Funerary Sculpture: Significance and Interpretations in Light of the Palmyra Portrait Project Corpus", in: Raja, R. (ed.), Revisiting the Religious Life of Palmyra, Contextualizing the Sacred 9, Turnhout: Brepols, 67–151.
- Raja, R. & Rüpke, J. (2018). "Introduction: Coming to terms with ancient religion", Religion in the Roman Empire 4:2, 157–161.
- Stott, David; Kristiansen, Søren Munch; Lichtenberger, Achim; Raja, Rubina (12 June 2018). "Mapping an ancient city with a century of remotely sensed data". Proceedings of the National Academy of Sciences. 115 (24): E5450–E5458. Bibcode:2018PNAS..115E5450S. doi:10.1073/pnas.1721509115. PMC 6004432. PMID 29844181.
- Ting, C., Lichtenberger, A. & Raja, R. (2019). "The technology and production of glazed ceramics from Middle Islamic Jerash, Jordan", Archaeometry 61:6, 1296–1312.
