= Liv Hornekær =

Danish physicist

- Born: 1972 (age 53–54); Copenhagen
- Occupations: Researcher, physicist
- Employer: Aarhus University
- Title: Professor
- Awards: EliteForsk Prize (2016)

Liv Hornekær (born 1972 in Copenhagen.) is a Danish experimental physicist who works in nanotechnology and astrochemical research.

She is a professor at the Department of Physics and Astronomy at Aarhus University and head of the surface dynamics group at the department. Her research mainly covers the interaction between hydrogen atoms and carbon-based surfaces

In 2016, she won the prestigious EliteForsk Prize, which was awarded by the Danish Ministry of Higher Education and Science. In 2017 she was appointed Professor of Physics at Aarhus University as the first woman ever, and in 2020 she was elected as member of The Royal Danish Academy of Sciences and Letters
