= Nicolai Bo Andersen =

Danish architect and professor

Nicolai Bo Andersen is a Danish architect and professor at the Royal Danish Academy – Architecture. He is the head of the Centre for Sustainable Building Culture and the master's program in Building Culture – Sustainability, Strategy, and Transformation. He works in the intersection of architectural phenomenology, cultural heritage and sustainability, specifically focusing on how embodied, first-person experiences can inspire ecological awareness. Andersen advocates for a paradigm shift from new construction to "cultivation," promoting the careful transformation and conservation of existing buildings.

== Background and career ==
Andersen studied at Cooper Union in New York City before graduating from the Royal Danish Academy of Fine Arts, School of Architecture in 1998. Over nearly three decades, his career has evolved from traditional architectural practice to a specialized focus on sustainable building culture. Rooted in Nordic building traditions, he critiques contemporary consumption in favor of a "sufficiency economy" that respects planetary boundaries. Andersen served on the Historic Buildings Council, appointed by the Danish Minister for Culture (2019–2023) and was appointed as a Policy Fellow expert at the University of Copenhagen's Queen Mary's Centre in 2024.

== Academic contribution ==
A central pillar of Andersen's theory is "New Phenomenology." Unlike traditional phenomenology, which may focus on the physical body, New Phenomenology emphasizes the "felt body" as the place of affective involvement. A key artistic research project include A House Like Me, an investigation into embodied communication and bio-based construction. He has developed a phenomenological method for architectural investigation, description and design, aiming to re-present architectural phenomena to contemporary attention. Andersen argues that the most sustainable building is the one that already exists.
