= Ole Sigmund =

Danish engineer and professor (born 1966)

- Born: 28 May 1966 (age 60)
- Education: Technical University of Denmark
- Known for: Topology optimization
- Awards: Gorm Pedersens Memorial Prize (1996); ISSMO/Springer Prize for Young Scientists (1999); Statoil Prize (2000); Grundfos Prize (2002); European Young Investigator Award (2004); EliteForsk Prize (2008); Villum Kann Rasmussen Prize (2010); VILLUM Investigator (2017); Fellow of ISSMO (2025)
- Scientific career
- Fields: Mechanical Engineering; Applied Mechanics; Solid Mechanics
- Workplaces: Technical University of Denmark
- Thesis: Design of Material Structures using Topology Optimization (1994)
- Doctoral advisor: Martin P. Bendsøe, Pauli Pedersen, Jon Juel Thomsen
- Website: www.topopt.dtu.dk

Ole Sigmund (born 28 May 1966) is a Danish mechanical engineer and professor at the Technical University of Denmark (DTU). His research focuses on topology optimization and has also extended to photonics and third medium contact formulations. He co-authored the 2003 book Topology Optimization: Theory, Methods, and Applications with Martin P. Bendsøe. He served as president of the International Society for Structural and Multidisciplinary Optimization (ISSMO) from 2011 to 2015 and was named to the inaugural class of Fellows of ISSMO in 2025.

== Education ==
Sigmund received an MSc in 1991, a PhD in 1995, and a Dr.Techn. degree in 2001, all from DTU.

== Career ==
After research positions at the University of Essen and Princeton University, Sigmund continued his academic career at DTU, where he became professor in 2010. He was a visiting researcher at the University of Colorado Boulder in 2012.

From 2004 to 2010 he chaired the Danish Center for Applied Mathematics and Mechanics (DCAMM), and from 2011 to 2015 he served as president of ISSMO. He is a VILLUM Investigator supported by the Villum Foundation, a member of DTU's Board of Governors, and a member of the EUROMECH Council.

His later work has also included photonics, including photonic inverse design, as well as co-authored extensions of the third medium contact method for topology optimization, including frictional formulations and three-dimensional contact problems.

A 2022 National Academies Press workshop volume described Sigmund, together with Noboru Kikuchi and Martin Bendsøe, as one of the founders and main contributors to the development of topology optimization methods in academia and industry.

== Honors and recognition ==
Sigmund received the European Young Investigator Award in 2004, the EliteForsk Prize in 2008, and the Villum Kann Rasmussen Prize in 2010. He was elected to the Danish Academy of Technical Sciences in 2003 and the Royal Danish Academy of Sciences and Letters in 2008.

== Selected works ==
- Topology Optimization: Theory, Methods, and Applications (with Martin P. Bendsøe, 2003)
- "Giga-voxel computational morphogenesis for structural design" (with Niels Aage, Erik Andreassen, and Boyan S. Lazarov, 2017)
