= Diplomatic capital =

Diplomatic capital refers to the trust, goodwill, and influence which a diplomat, or a state represented by its diplomats, has within international diplomacy. According to political scientist Rebecca Adler-Nissen, diplomatic capital is a kind of currency that can be traded in diplomatic negotiations and that is increased when positive ″social competences, reputation and personal authority" are portrayed.

== Accumulation and loss ==
Diplomatic capital can be accumulated by economic cooperation and by contributions to the solution of international crises, It is strengthened when in other countries the sentiment prevails that the interests of a state or the diplomats representing it are aligned with their own interests. Conversely, it can be squandered when a country engages in a confrontation, an armed conflict or a war, if that is perceived as unjust or at odds with the interests of others.

Diplomatic capital is also linked to the extent of enforcement of human rights.

== See also ==
- Alliance
- Cultural diplomacy
- Mandate (politics)
- Political capital
- Public diplomacy
- Social capital
