= Sannino =

Sannino is an Italian surname. Notable people with the surname include:

- Francesco Sannino (born 1968), Italian theoretical physicist
- Giuseppe Sannino (born 1957), Italian footballer and manager
- Stefano Sannino (born 1959), Italian diplomat and civil servant
