= Albrechtsen =

Albrechtsen is a surname. Notable people with the surname include:

- Frank Albrechtsen, New Zealand footballer
- Holger Albrechtsen (1906–1992), Norwegian hurdler
- Jacob Albrechtsen (born 1990), Danish footballer
- Janet Albrechtsen (born 1966), Australian journalist
- Martin Albrechtsen (born 1980), Danish footballer
- Svend Albrechtsen (1917–1975), Danish footballer
- Sharmi Albrechtsen, Canadian-born American-Indian author
