= Batavian Society for Experimental Philosophy =

The Batavian Society for Experimental Philosophy (Dutch: Bataafsch Genootschap voor Proefondervindelijke Wijsbegeerte) is a Dutch learned society residing in Rotterdam.

== History ==
The society was founded on June 3, 1769 after Steven Hoogendijk declared in his last will that after his death a foundation for the furtherance of experimental philosophy (a term now called 'Science') would inherit his fortune. His fortune would be more than sufficient to secure the foundation's financial future for a long time. The society met as a gentlemen's club of amateur scientists. The initial directors were:

- dr. Salomon de Monchy, professor of health
- dr. Leonard Patyn, professor of health
- dr. Lambert Bicker, Remonstrant minister
- Cornelis Nozeman, Remonstrant minister
- Martinus Schouten, physician

They asked for permission from stadtholder Willem V to award medals for answers to prize questions, as so many other societies did in those days. After obtaining his permission, they again needed to ask permission from the States of Holland and West Friesland, because the Hollandsche Maatschappij der Wetenschappen had heard of their intention and protested. They felt that having two such societies in one province (the province of Holland) was in violation of their own privilege. The directors were able to convince the States of their case for a society in Rotterdam, however, and they obtained their privilege in 1770 and produced a program of prize questions the same year. Their first edition of their society magazine with the winning prize answers was published in 1774. It was called Verhandelingen van het Bataafsch Genootschap der Proefondervindelijke Wijsbegeerte and awarded a prize medal of 30 ducats in gold to winners. The medal was first designed by G. van Moelingen probably in 1769 and improved by Johann Georg Holtzhey after 1772. Later the prize medal was redesigned in 1866 by Johan Philip Menger. Hoogendijk himself lived to a great age and saw the society flourish. He also published a piece on a pyrometer in the first edition of the magazine in 1774.

The Society suffered during the French occupation of the Netherlands in the late 18th and early 19th century, due to the tiercering. In 1917, a major part of the Society's capital was lost during the Russian Revolution as the Russian bonds owned by the Society became worthless. The Batavian Society suffered an even heavier blow during the bombardment of Rotterdam in May 1940, when essentially all archival material and historic artifacts were lost.

Currently, the Society, with around 400 members, is a forum for scientists living in the vicinity of Rotterdam. Six scientific meetings per annum, mostly dedicated to medicine and engineering sciences, are held plus a one-day convention, where the Steven Hoogendijk Premiums are awarded to young scientists.
