= Christian Barker Jørgensen =

Danish zoologist (1915–2007)

Carl Christian Barker Jørgensen (11 August, 1915 – 12 October, 2007) was a Danish zoologist.

He was hired at the University of Copenhagen in 1945, and finished his doctoral thesis The Amphibian Water Economy with Special Regard to the Effect of Neurohypophysical Extracts in 1950. From 1965, he was a professor of zoophysiology at the same university.

He was a fellow of the Royal Danish Academy of Sciences and Letters from 1965 and the Norwegian Academy of Science and Letters from 1968, and received the Thunberg Medal in 1970.
