= Kunstakademiets Arkitektskole =

Coordinates: 55.6821°N 12.6040°E

Royal Danish Academy – Architecture
- Established: 1754
- Students: 650
- Location: Copenhagen, Denmark
- Campus: Copenhagen
- Website: Royal Danish Academy – Architecture

Royal Danish Academy – Architecture (Danish: Det Kongelige Akademi – Arkitektur) is an institution of higher education in Copenhagen, Denmark. Established in 1754, it is one of the oldest architecture schools in the world.

== Structure ==
Royal Danish Academy – Architecture has four institutes, operating independently of each other. The school offers five three-year bachelor's degree programs and fourteen two-year master's degree programs. The institutes also host researchers and doctoral students through six research centers.

=== Institutes ===
- Institute of Architecture, Urbanism and Landscape (Institut for Bygningskunst, By og Landskab)
- Institute of Architecture and Culture (Institut for Bygningskunst og Kultur)
- Institute of Architecture and Technology (Institut for Bygningskunst og Teknologi)
- Institute of Architecture and Design (Institut for Bygningskunst og Design), shared with The School of Design

=== Bachelor degree programs ===
- Architecture's Anatomy and Fabrication (Arkitekturens Anatomi og Fabrikation)
- City and Country (By og Land)
- Taking Place (Finder sted)
- Whole and Part (Helhed og Del)
- Complexity Handling in Practice (Kompleksitetshåndtering i Praksis)

=== Master degree programs ===
- Architecture and Extreme Environments
- Architecture & Landscape (Arkitektur & Landskab)
- Settlement, Ecology & Tectonics (Bosætning, Økologi og Tektonik)
- Computation in Architecture
- Creative Biofabrication
- Furniture Design - Products, Materials and Contexts
- Critical Symbiosis
- Cultural Heritage, Transformation and Conservation (Kulturarv, Transformation og Restaurering)
- Art and Architecture (Kunst og Arkitektur)
- Planetary Boundaries
- Political Architecture: Critical Sustainability
- Spatial Design - Architecture, Design and Interiors
- Strategic Design & Entrepreneurship - Architecture, Design and Business
- Urbanism and Societal Change

=== Research centers ===
- Center for Sustainable Building Culture (Center for Bæredygtig Bygningskultur)
- CINARK - Center for Industrialised Architecture (Center for Industriel Arkitektur)
- Center for Interior Studies
- CITA - Centre for Information Technology and Architecture
- Centre for Visibility Design
- KLOTHING - Centre for Apparel, Textiles & Ecology Research

The Head of Center of CITA, Professor Mette Ramsgaard Thomsen, received the Danish Council for Independent Research's EliteForsk Prize (Elite Research Prize) in 2016, becoming the first architectural researcher to receive the award.
