= N. Asger Mortensen =

Danish physicist

- Born: Niels Asger Mortensen; 6 May 1973 (age 53)
- Education: Technical University of Denmark
- Awards: IOP Fellow (2018); EliteForsk Prize (2018); VILLUM Investigator (2017); APS Fellow (2017); OSA Fellow (2016); SPIE Fellow (2014)
- Scientific career
- Fields: Condensed-matter physics; Photonics; Theoretical physics
- Workplaces: University of Southern Denmark; Technical University of Denmark
- Thesis: Mesoscopic Coulomb Drag (2001)
- Doctoral advisor: Antti-Pekka Jauho
- Website: www.mortensen-lab.org

N. Asger Mortensen (born 6 May 1973) is a Danish theoretical physicist who has made contributions to the fields of nanotechnology, including mesoscopic physics, nanofluidics, photonic-crystal fibers, slow light photonic crystals, and plasmonics. He is known for his contributions to understanding nonlocal light–matter interactions at the interface between classical electromagnetism and quantum physics.

== Education ==
He attended Sorø Academy before enrolling at the Technical University of Denmark where he earned his MSc in Engineering/Applied Physic (1998), his PhD in Theoretical Physics (2001), and his Dr. Techn. (2006), the later being a habilitation degree based on his research conducted in industry. The Dr. Scient. (2021) was awarded by University of Copenhagen.

== Career ==
He was in 2017 called by the University of Southern Denmark (SDU) to become a professor in the SDU Center for Nano Optics, while also holding a D-IAS Chair of Technical Science at the Danish Institute for Advanced Study. Before that he was a professor (faculty since 2004) at the Technical University of Denmark, while also holding prior experience as a research scientist (2001-2004) in industry with Crystal Fibre A/S (now NKT Photonics). He has been a visiting scientist at the Lorentz Institute at University of Leiden (1998, 2000), the Niels Bohr Institute at University of Copenhagen (1999-2001), and he was an Abbe Guest Professor at the University of Jena (2015). He is currently a VILLUM Investigator supported by the VILLUM Foundation.
