= Poul F. Kjaer =

Danish sociologist of law and legal theorist

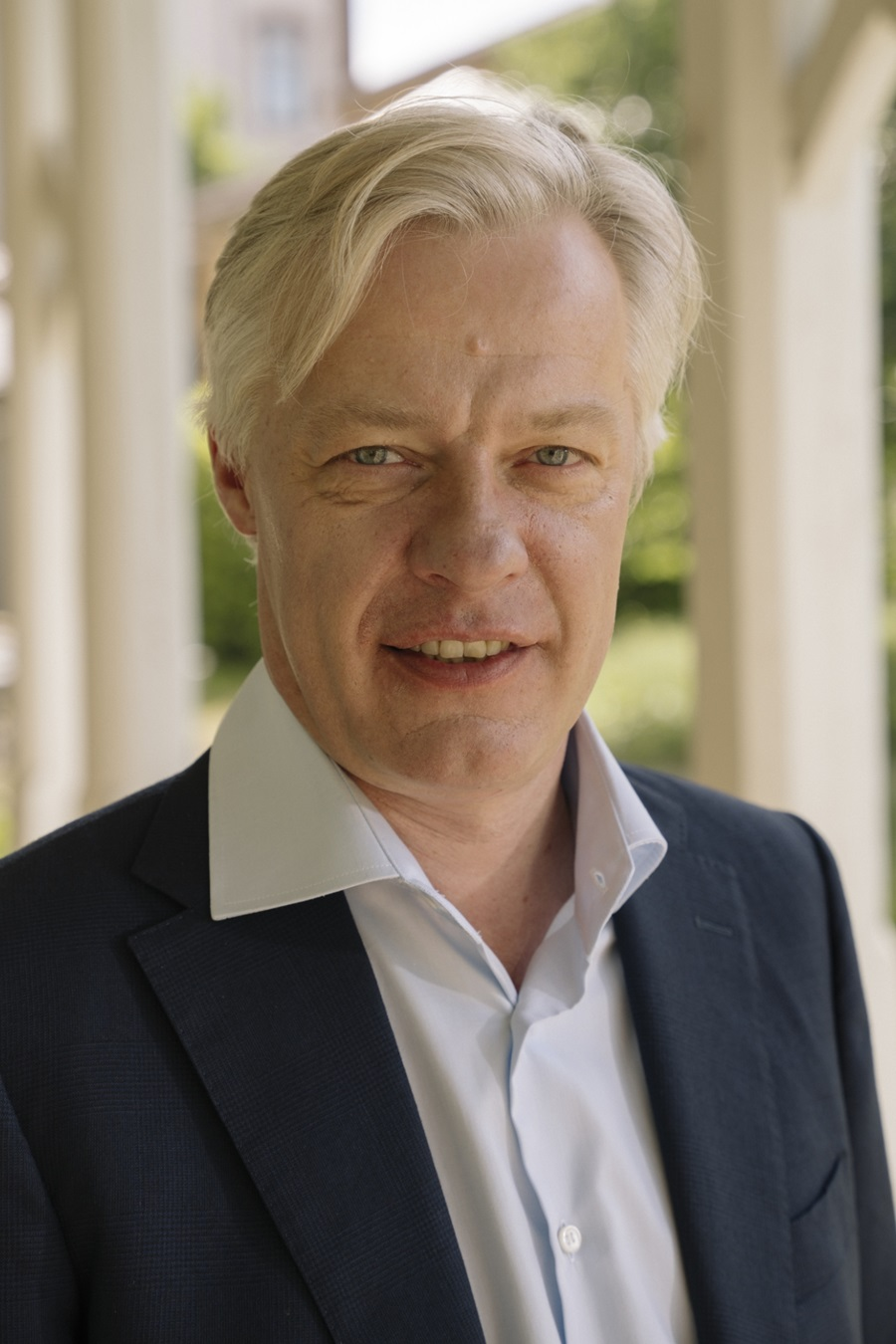
- Born: Poul Fritz Kjaer; 2 September 1974 (age 52); Vejle, Denmark
- Occupation: Academic
- Known for: Constitutionalism in the Global Realm; The Law of Political Economy; transformative law
- Title: Professor of Governance and Sociology of Law
- Awards: EliteForsk Prize (2023)
- Honors: Member of Academia Europaea (2025)

Academic background
- Education: Aarhus University; European University Institute; Goethe University Frankfurt

Academic work
- Discipline: Sociology of law
- Sub-discipline: Legal theory; political economy; global governance; theory of society
- Institutions: Copenhagen Business School

Poul F. Kjaer (born 2 September 1974), is a Danish scholar of sociology of law, legal theory, political economy, global governance and societal theory. He is Professor of Governance and Sociology of Law at the Department of Business Humanities and Law, Copenhagen Business School. His work primarily examines the role of law in the constitution, transformation and stabilisation of social, economic and political orders, with particular emphasis on European integration, globalisation, constitutionalism, global value chains and the historical sociology of law.

Kjaer has developed related lines of scholarship on post-national constitutionalism, the law of political economy, transformative law, transnational governance and global value chain law. He has directed two European Research Council projects. One on institutional transformation in European political economy and one on the legal structuring of global value chains. He received the Danish EliteForsk Prize in 2023 and was elected to Academia Europaea in 2025.

== Education ==
Kjaer was born in Vejle, Denmark. He holds a BA and MSc in political science from Aarhus University, a Master of Research and PhD in law from the European University Institute in Florence, and a habilitation in sociology of law from Goethe University Frankfurt. His educational formation spans political science, law and sociology, which also structures the interdisciplinary orientation of his later work.

== Career ==
=== Academic career ===
Kjaer has held academic positions at the European University Institute, Goethe University Frankfurt, the University of Copenhagen and Copenhagen Business School. He was a PhD researcher and research assistant at the European University Institute; a senior research fellow at the Cluster of Excellence Formation of Normative Orders at Goethe University Frankfurt; associate professor at the Faculty of Law, University of Copenhagen; and later associate professor and professor at Copenhagen Business School.

At Copenhagen Business School, Kjaer became Professor with Special Responsibilities in European Law, Governance and Political Economy in 2013 and Professor of Governance and Sociology of Law in 2018. He also served as director of the Politics and Public Management Research Group from 2019 to 2022 and is currently principal investigator for the research cluster Geopolitics, Geoeconomics and Business.

=== Visiting position and fellowships ===
Kjaer has spent time at several scholarly institutions outside his principal appointments. These include Humboldt University Berlin, the University of Bielefeld, the London School of Economics and Political Science, Goethe University Frankfurt, the Centre for European Law and Politics at the University of Bremen, EHESS in Paris,Sciences Po in Paris, Harvard University, the Max Planck Institute for the Study of Societies in Cologne, the Paris Institute for Advanced Study, Stellenbosch Institute for Advanced Study, the Amsterdam Centre for Transformative Private Law, and the Research in Political Philosophy and Ethics Leuven programme at KU Leuven.

=== Work ===
Kjaer's work is primarily situated at the intersection of sociology of law, constitutional theory, political economy and global governance. It is concerned with the legal forms through which social orders become constituted, connected and transformed.

=== Constitutionalism and global law ===
Kjaer's book Constitutionalism in the Global Realm: A Sociological Approach develops a theory of constitutionalism beyond the nation-state. Rather than treating constitutions only as state-bound legal documents, the book approaches constitutional ordering as a historically changing social form that can also appear in transnational and global settings. The analysis links constitutionalism to the differentiation of world society and to the institutional forms through which law, politics and other social systems are stabilised.

This line of work is connected to Kjaer's earlier analysis of Europe's post-national constellation in Between Governing and Governance, where the European Union is interpreted through transformations in public power, governance and transnational institutional ordering.

=== Law of political economy ===
Kjaer's law-of-political-economy work examines how legal forms structure economic orders and how economic processes are politically and legally constituted. In the edited volume The Law of Political Economy: Transformation in the Function of Law, the law of political economy is presented as a socio-legal approach to the relationship between law, markets, public power and social transformation.

The approach grew out of Kjaer's ERC Starting Grant project on institutional transformation in European political economy. It rejects a narrow view of law as either external regulation of economic activity or a mere reflection of market relations. Instead, law is treated as a constitutive infrastructure of economic and political order.

=== Transformative law ===
Kjaer's later work on transformative law addresses the capacity of law not only to maintain normative expectations but also to reshape social phenomena by giving them legal form. In this account, law is not reduced to commands, prohibitions or dispute settlement. It also operates through the formation of categories, infrastructures and institutional arrangements that make specific forms of social action possible.

Kjaer's articles "The Law of Political Economy as Transformative Law" and "What is Transformative Law?" develop this approach by asking how law might respond to societal problems such as ecological transition, geopolitical fragmentation, value-chain restructuring and the changing role of public and private power. The concept is presented as an alternative to older imaginaries of law as purpose, law as tool, law as obstacle, or law as reflexivity-initiation.

=== Global value chains and connectivity ===
Through the ERC Advanced Grant project Global Value Chain Law: Constituting Connectivity, Contracts and Corporations, Kjaer studies how global value chains are legally constituted. This strand of work analyses contracts, corporations, standards and regulatory regimes as infrastructures that connect production, exchange and governance across jurisdictions.

The project links global value chains to broader questions about legal connectivity, democratic regulation, corporate power, labour, environmental regulation and human rights. It is also connected to Kjaer's historical-sociological interest in how forms of social order emerge and change over long time horizons.

=== Social theory, governance and institutional transformation ===
Across his work, Kjaer draws on social theory and historical sociology to analyse the transformation of intermediary institutions, public power and governance. His research has addressed the movement from corporatist forms of social ordering to neo-corporatism and governance, as well as the role of law in constructing compatibility between different social spheres.

This social-theoretical orientation connects Kjaer legal scholarship to debates on systems theory, constitutional sociology, economic sociology and the evolution of modern institutions.

=== Grants and honours ===
• European Research Council Advanced Grant, Global Value Chain Law: Constituting Connectivity, Contracts and Corporations, 2023–2027.

• European Research Council Starting Grant, Institutional Transformation in European Political Economy: A Socio-Legal Approach, 2014–2017.

• Carlsberg Foundation grants, including a Semper Ardens grant for established senior researchers and an Excellence Grant.

• EliteForsk Prize, awarded by the Danish Ministry of Higher Education and Science, 2023.

• Member of Academia Europaea, 2025.

== Selected publications ==
• Between Governing and Governance: On the Emergence, Function and Form of Europe's Post-national Constellation. Oxford: Hart Publishing, 2010.

• Constitutionalism in the Global Realm: A Sociological Approach. London and New York: Routledge, 2014.

• The Evolution of Intermediary Institutions in Europe: From Corporatism to Governance, edited with Eva Hartmann. Basingstoke: Palgrave Macmillan, 2015.

• Critical Theories of Crisis in Europe: From Weimar to the Euro, edited with Niklas Olsen. London: Rowman & Littlefield International, 2016.

• The Law of Political Economy: Transformation in the Function of Law, edited by Poul F. Kjaer. Cambridge: Cambridge University Press, 2020.

• "The Law of Political Economy as Transformative Law: A New Approach to the Concept and Function of Law." Global Perspectives 2, no. 1, 2021.

• "What is Transformative Law?" European Law Open 1, no. 4, 2022.

• "Five Variations of Transformative Law. Beyond Private and Public Interests." Erasmus Law Review 17, no. 2, 2023.

• "From Conflicts Law to Transformative Law: Facing Fragmented Globalisation." European Law Open 4, no. 1, 2025.

• "Three Futures of the World: Armageddon, Brazilianization or Regulatory Hegemony." Maastricht Journal of European and Comparative Law 32, no. 4, 2025.
