= Ulrik Lund Andersen =

Danish physicist (born 1972)

Ulrik Lund Andersen (born 1972) is a Danish physicist and professor of physics at the Department of Physics at the Technical University of Denmark (DTU), who researches quantum optics and quantum networks. He is the head of quantum information group has been serving as the director of center of bigQ - Center for Macroscopic Quantum States since January 2018.

== Education, career and awards ==
He went to Ikast-Brande Gymnasium high school. He received a Master of Science in Applied Physics from DTU in 1999 and a Ph.D. also from DTU in 2003. He was a postdoc and Assistant Professor and at the University of Erlangen–Nuremberg in Germany from 2003-2006, and was then employed as an associate professor at DTU from 2006-2012. In 2012, he was appointed as a full professor and section leader at DTU Physics.

He is co-founder and scientific advisor of Alea Technologies and DIASENSE.

In 2013, Andersen received the EliteForsk Prize in recognition of his work on quantum optics.
