= International Academic Association for the Enhancement of Learning in Higher Education =

Advance learning centred higher education

The Institute for Learning in Higher Education (LiHE) was set up in 2007 to advance learning centred higher education. It functions a network bringing together international researchers and practitioners within higher education, to further advance research in this area. LiHE is voluntarily run by a group of co-directors, all serving as professors at various universities and business schools.

The executive director of LiHE is Professor Dr. Claus Nygaard (Copenhagen Business School, Denmark). Co-directors are Professor Dr. John Branch (University of Michigan, Ann Arbor); Professor Dr. Paul Bartholomew (Aston University, Birmingham). Previous co-directors are Dr. Nigel Courtney (Cass Business School, London); Professor Clive Holtham (Cass Business School, London).
