= Political capital =

Means by which a politician or political party may gain support or popularity

Political capital (PC) refers to an individual's ability to influence political decisions. Political capital can be understood as a metaphor used in political theory to conceptualize the accumulation of resources and power built through relationships, trust, goodwill, and influence between politicians or parties and other stakeholders, such as constituents. Political capital can be understood as a type of currency used to mobilize voters, achieve policy reform, or accomplish other political goals. Although not a literal form of capital, political capital is often described as a type of credit, or a resource that can be banked, spent or misspent, invested, lost, and saved.

Some thinkers distinguish between reputational and representative political capital. Reputational capital refers to a politician's credibility and reliability. It is accumulated by maintaining consistent policy positions and ideological views. Representative capital refers to a politician's influence in policymaking. It is accumulated through experience, seniority, and serving in leadership positions. Thus, political capital—reputational and representative—is the product of relationships among opinion (public impressions), policy (legislative rewards/penalties), and political judgement (prudent decision-making).

== Origins ==
Pierre Bourdieu is regularly credited with developing the most popular theories of political capital (as well as social capital) in his 1991 book Language and Symbolic Power. However, the concept of political capital was introduced to political theory in 1961 by American political scientist Edward C. Banfield in his book Political Influence. Banfield described political capital as a “stock of influence” which might be built “by 'buying' a bit here and there from the many small 'owners' who were endowed with it by the constitution-makers”—that is, political capital can be used for types of exchange between politicians or between politicians and voters. Like money, Banfield says, political capital must be spent and saved wisely, or a politician would be “out of business” before long.

Bourdieu's theory of political capital further elaborates on the metaphor of money and the concept of capital itself. In “The Forms of Capital”, Bourdieu defines capital as “accumulated labor (in its materialized form or its 'incorporated,' embodied form) which, when appropriated…by agents or groups of agents, enables them to appropriate social energy in the form of reified or living labor.” Political capital, then, is how symbolically understood capital functions within a political system: it is a form of credit accumulated by politicians, which can be used to accomplish other goals, such as the work required to pass legislation or achieve reelection.

== Measurement ==
A variety of approaches within political theory measure political capital as a way of analyzing its influence on local, regional, state, national, and international politics. Political capital is sometimes theorized in terms of objectification, or applying concrete forms to the otherwise abstract concept. Some theorists consider things like the number of votes, people present at a meeting, protesters present at a march, money donated to a political campaign, public opinion survey results, and other factors to be objectified or material and measurable elements of political capital.

Theorists also consider political capital within a framework of instrumental and structural elements; instrumental political capital is made up of available resources, such as funding, while structural political capital shapes decision-making processes.

== Dynamics ==
The amount of political capital one has is assigned from observers rather than claimed by oneself. A politician gains political capital by winning elections, pursuing policies that have public support, achieving success with initiatives, and performing favors for other politicians. Political capital can also be wasted, such as by failed attempts to promote unpopular policies that are not central to a politician's agenda.

== Criticism ==
Journalist Michael Hirsh has argued that the concept of political capital is often misunderstood and unhelpful at explaining the dynamics of political power.

== See also ==
- Diplomatic capital
- Mandate (politics)
- Social capital
