= Thomas Sinkjær =

Danish scientist (born 1958)

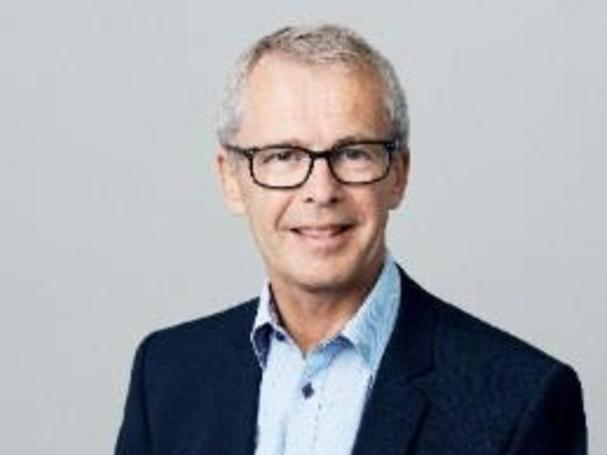
- Born: March 9, 1958 (age 68)
- Education: Aalborg University; University of Copenhagen
- Scientific career
- Fields: Neurophysiology; Neural engineering Rehabilitation engineering Biomedical engineering
- Workplaces: Aalborg University (present); University of Calgary; Northwestern University; Lundbeck Foundation; Danish National Research Foundation; Villum Fonden; The Royal Danish Academy of Sciences and Letters (present)

Thomas Sinkjær R (born 1958) is a Danish scientist and professor of neuroscience and technology at the Department of Health Science and Technology of Aalborg University, Denmark. He is the Secretary General of the Royal Danish Academy of Sciences and Letters and an elected fellow of the Danish Academy of Technical Sciences.

== Education ==
Sinkjær has a degree in electronic and medical engineering from Aalborg University (1983) where he also completed his PhD in a joint venture with University of Calgary, Canada (1988). Sinkjær has a doctorate in Medicine (DMSc) from Copenhagen University (1998).

== Career ==
Sinkjær was post-doctoral fellow at Northwestern University, Chicago, from 1989 to 1990. Following this post, he returned to Denmark, where he has been a professor at Aalborg University since 1993. From 1993 to 2006, he was the director of the Danish National Research Foundations Center for Sensory- Motor Interaction (SMI) at Aalborg University. From 2007 to 2015, Sinkjær was director of the Danish National Research Foundation. He has been director of science of the Villum Foundation from 2015 to 2017. From 2018 to 2019 he was the vice-president of the Lundbeck Foundation, additionally managing the foundation's talent programme from 2019 to 2021. In addition to the already mentioned, Sinkjær has held positions in several other boards and organizations. Positions include president of International Society for Functional Electrical Stimulation (IFESS), panel chair of the European Research Council (ERC)'s Advanced Grant Panel, member of the scientific selection committee under the Research Council of Norway, and member of the Danish Minister for Higher Education and Science's Danish Council for Research and Innovation Policy (from 2017 to 2023).

Since 2020, Sinkjær has been a member of the presidium of the Royal Danish Academy of Sciences and Letters, of which he was elected Secretary General in 2021. Since 2021, he has been a board member of the Elsass Foundation, where he is also head of committee for the Elsass Foundation Research Prize. Sinkjær is chairman of the boards of Bevica Fonden and Bevica Innovation, and the Danish national Siemens Foundation (part of the Global Alliance of Siemens Foundations).

== Awards and honors (selected) ==
- 1996: Villum Kann Rasmussen’s Annual Grant
- 2002: Medico-Award, Danish Medical Device Industry for outstanding research within Biomedical Engineering
- 2004: International Steven Hoogendijk Award in Medical Engineering
- 2004: The Research Award of Vanførefonden
- 2010: Mathilde and Jeppe Juhl's Memorial Scholarship
- 2015: Knight of the Order of the Dannebrog, Denmark

== Selected works ==
Thomas Sinkjær has contributed more than 200 scientific papers, reviews, and book chapters.

Five of his most cited papers are:

- Dietz, Volker; Sinkjaer, Thomas (2007-08). "Spastic movement disorder: impaired reflex function and altered muscle mechanics". The Lancet Neurology. 6 (8): 725–733. doi:10.1016/S1474-4422(07)70193-X (open access).
- Sinkjaer, T.; Toft, E.; Andreassen, S.; Hornemann, B. C. (1988-09-01). "Muscle stiffness in human ankle dorsiflexors: intrinsic and reflex components". Journal of Neurophysiology. 60 (3): 1110–1121. doi:10.1152/jn.1988.60.3.1110 (open access).
- Sinkjær, T.; Magnussen, I. (1994). "Passive, intrinsic and reflex-mediated stiffness in the ankle extensors of hemiparetic patients". Brain. 117 (2): 355–363. doi:10.1093/brain/117.2.355 (subscription).
- Sinkjær, T.; Andersen, J. B.; Ladouceur, M.; Christensen, L. O. D.; Nielsen, J. B. (2000-03). "Major role for sensory feedback in soleus EMG activity in the stance phase of walking in man". The Journal of Physiology. 523 (3): 817–827. doi:10.1111/j.1469-7793.2000.00817.x (open access).
- Lyons, G.M.; Sinkjaer, T.; Burridge, J.H.; Wilcox, D.J. (2002-12). "A review of portable FES-based neural orthoses for the correction of drop foot". IEEE Transactions on Neural Systems and Rehabilitation Engineering. 10 (4): 260–279. doi:10.1109/TNSRE.2002.806832 (open access).
