= Jens-Otto Paludan =

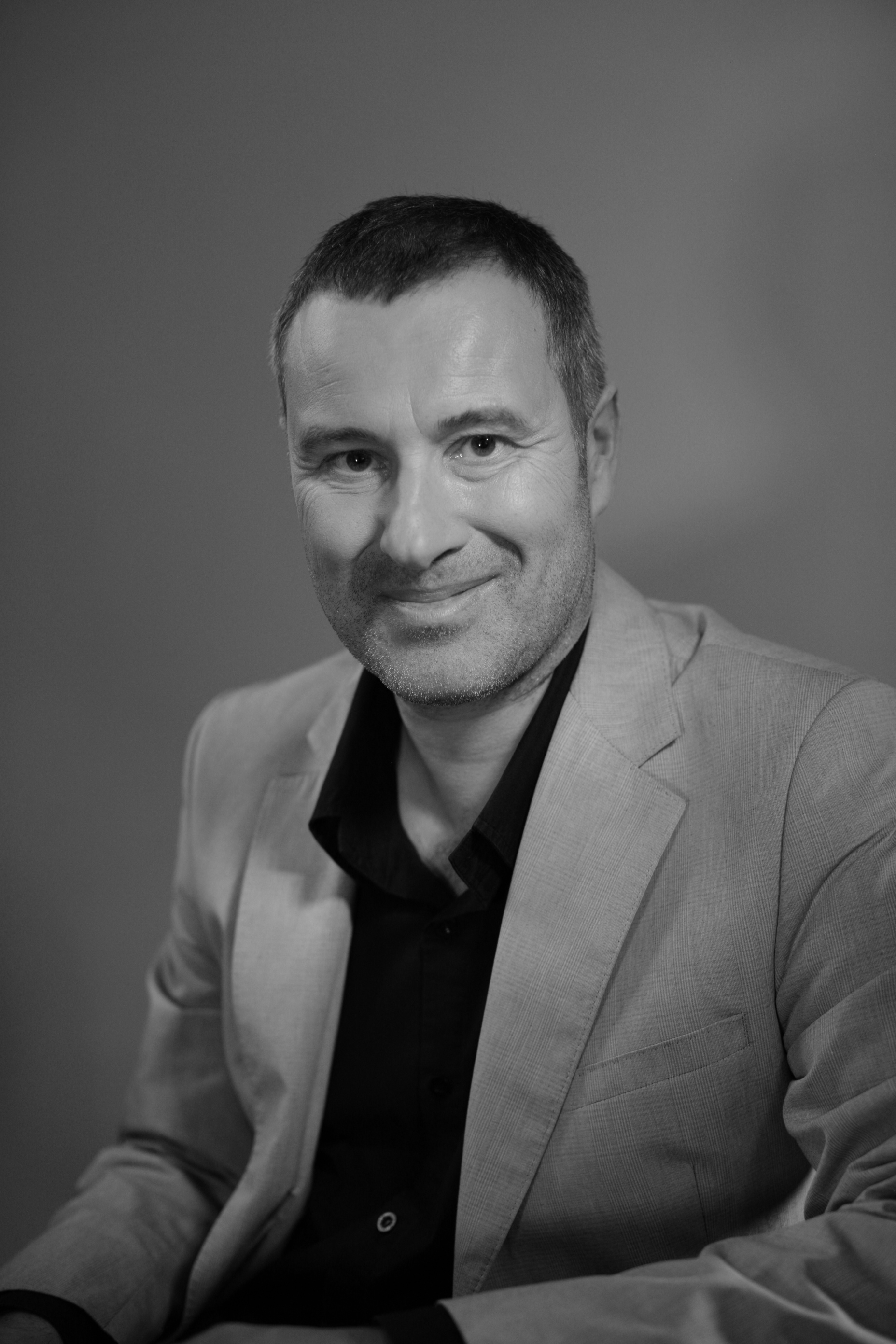
Jens-Otto Paludan

Jens-Otto Paludan (born July 18, 1963) was CEO of Universal Music in Denmark from 1994 to 2007.

In 1990 Paludan graduated with an MBA from Copenhagen Business School. His education led to a position as marketing manager at the publishing firm MIX, where he was responsible for the marketing of the music and youth magazine MIX. From MIX he came directly to MCA Music Entertainment as CEO and thus started the company from scratch, and in 2000 he was appointed CEO of Universal Music Denmark following the acquisition of PolyGram.

Jens-Otto Paludan was thus the driving force behind the biggest Danish music sensation ever - Aqua - which sold +14 million albums and 10 million singles worldwide. In addition, he obtained great international success with Safri Duo, Junior Senior, Barcode Brothers and DJ Encore, among others. Jens-Otto Paludan is thus the Danish record company executive, who has sold the most records with Danish artists, outside Denmark, ever.

After his time with Universal Music, Paludan worked as self-employed as well as serving on various boards of directors. Thus, he was co-founder of the web agency Reload! A/S in 2008, where he is still co-owner and chairman. In addition, he was MD of his own management company from 2008 to 2013, where he exclusively represented a.o.; Casper Christensen, Andreas Bo and Pernille Rosendahl. During this period he produced the stand-up show "Now As People" with Casper Christensen / Frank Hvam, and also produced the show "Plagiarism" with Andreas Bo.

In 2011 he was co-founder of the fashion portal ANYWEAR, and in 2015 the Scandinavian rights to the platform were sold to the Bonnier-owned publishing firm Benjamin Media.

From 2008 to 2012, Paludan was a member of the board of directors of The Royal Theatre (The Danish National Theatre for Opera / Ballet / Drama). He has also been a member of the board of artFREQ since 2008, served on the board of IFPI from 1999 to 2005 and as chairman from 2005 to 2007, member of the board of Gramex in 2006 and as chairman in 2007, member of the board of MXD from 2005 to 2007, and member of the board of GDC from 1995 to 2002 and as chairman from 2002 to 2004.

Jens-Otto has also been featured in two small film roles, one in connection with the TV-edition of the show "Now As People", and later in a role as himself in the movie "Clown Forever".
