= Steven Hoogendijk =

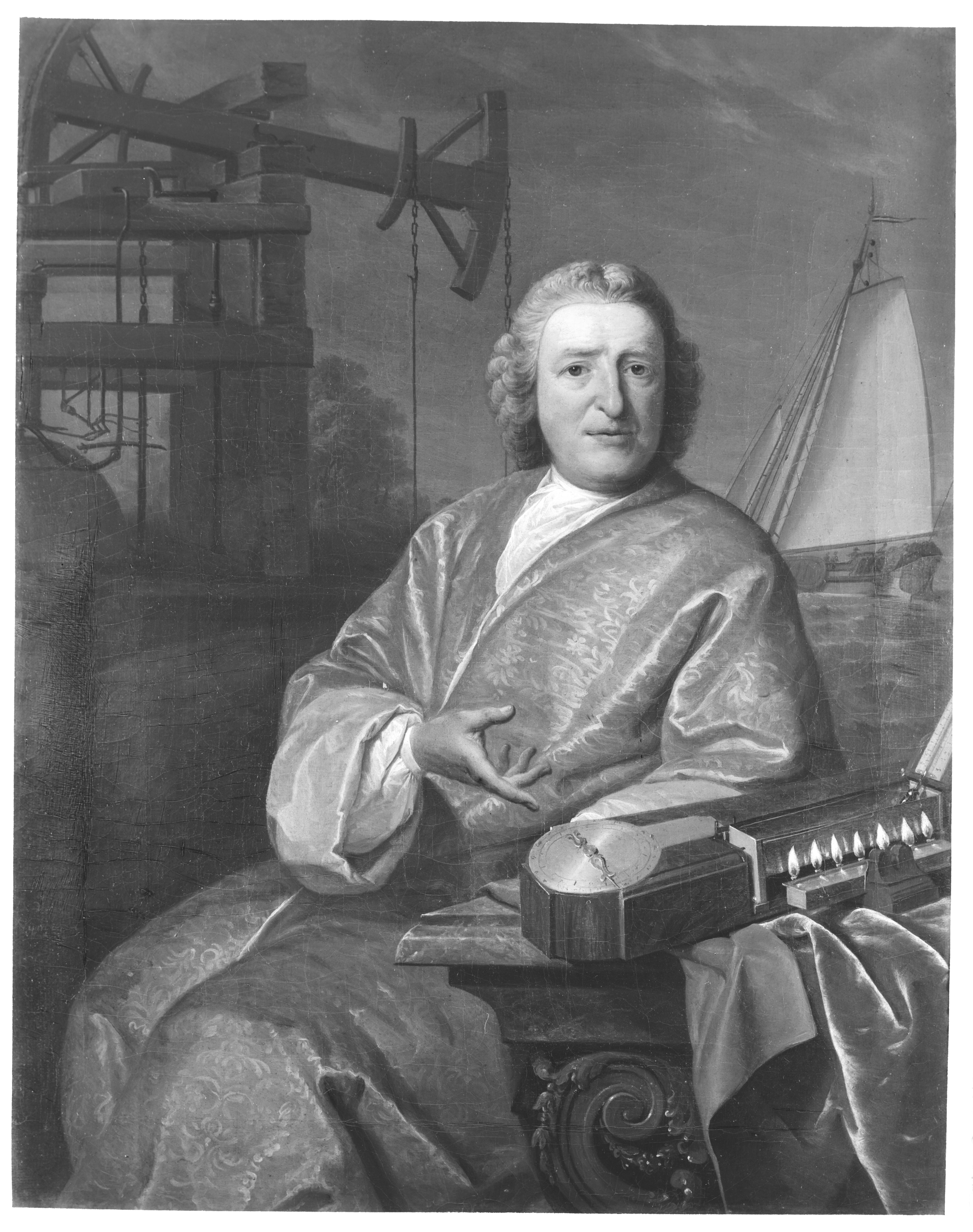
- Born: 1 April 1698; Rotterdam, Dutch Republic
- Died: 3 July 1788 (aged 90); Rotterdam, Dutch Republic
- Occupations: Watch and instrument maker, physicist

Steven Hoogendijk (1 April 1698 – 3 July 1788) was a Rotterdam watch and instrument maker and physicist.

== Career ==
In 1769, Steven Hoogendijk co-founded the Batavian Society for Experimental Philosophy, with a main aim of introducing the steam engine in the Netherlands, with the motto: "Certos Feret experientia fructus" (experience will give reliable products). With the support of the Society at their own expense they brought a Newcomen steam engine from England to an old Powder Tower at the edge of Rotterdam. On 9 March 1776, the machine was first put into operation. The steam engine components worked well, but the self-designed wooden Hoogendijk pumps were not compatible and quickly collapsed. This made it such an impression that in 1787 a new steam engine was built in the Polder Blijdorp. The expected theoretical capacity of 1750 cubic feet per minute displacement was only 5% higher than the observed effective capacity. Nevertheless, general acceptance in the Netherlands of the steam engine was slow due to allegiance to the existing mill methods. His portrait to the right, shows him pointing to an early pyrometer from Pieter van Musschenbroeck with pumps in the background.

== International Steven Hoogendijk Prizes ==
The triennial International Steven Hoogendijk Prize for medical engineering was first awarded in 2001, shared by three individuals, Professors Nicolas Bom and Jan Somer, both from the Netherlands, and Prof. David Sahn of Portland, Oregon. The subject was pediatric echocardiography. The second award in 2004 was given to Prof. Thomas Sinkjaer from Aalborg, Denmark, recognizing his work on functional electro-stimulation to recover lost neuromuscular functions of the human body. The third award in 2007 was for Prof. Willi Kalender, from Erlangen, Germany, inventor of the spiral CT scanner. In 2010, the award went to George M. Church, of Harvard Medical School, for "minimal invasive diagnosis" (genome sequencing technology). The award in 2010 was presented by Rotterdam mayor Ahmed Aboutaleb after introductory comments by Prof. H.W. Tilanus (CEO of the Batavian Society) and Frank Grosveld of Erasmus Medical Center and interview by comedian Raoul Heertje. The 2016 prize was awarded to Richard M. Durbin and the 2018 prize to Larry Gold. The 2020 prize went to Nicholas Ayache.
