= Marie-Louise Nosch =

Danish historian in the University of Copenhagen

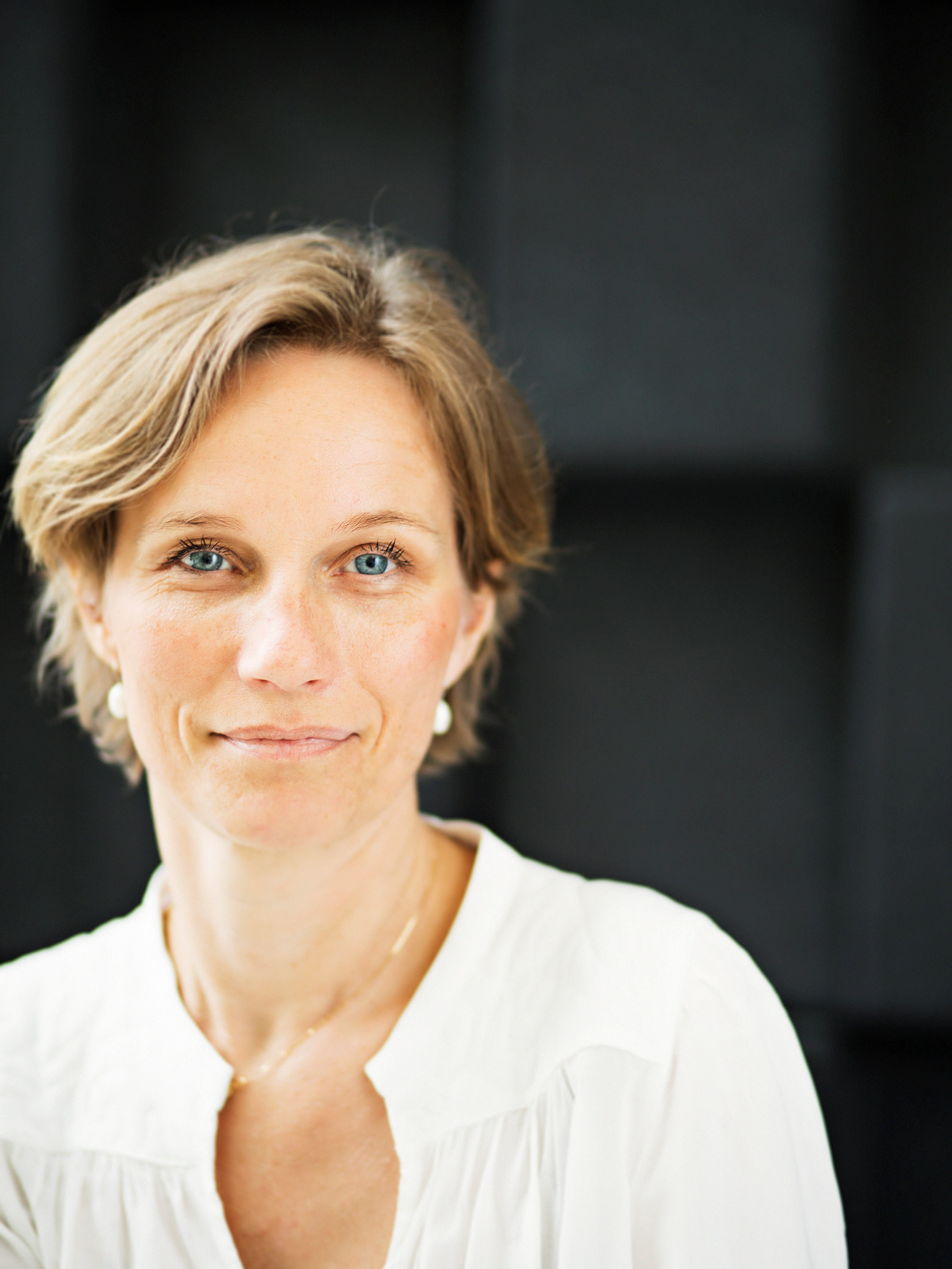
- Born: Marie-Louise Bech Gregersen

Academic background
- Education: Université Nancy II; University of Copenhagen; University of Salzburg (PhD)
- Thesis: The Organisation of Work in the Mycenaean Textile Industry (2000)

Academic work
- Discipline: archaeologist
- Sub-discipline: prehistoric textiles
- Institutions: Centre for Textile Research, SAXO Institute, University of Copenhagen

Marie-Louise Bech Nosch (January 1970 -; née Gregersen) is a Professor in the University of Copenhagen and an expert in the interdisciplinary study of prehistoric textiles. Her main research focus is on the evidence for textile production in Mycenaean Greece provided by the Linear B tablets; she has also published widely on the cross-cultural study of textiles from across the ancient Mediterranean and Near East.

== Education and career ==
Nosch studied history at the Université Nancy II and history and classical philology at the University of Copenhagen. After obtaining her PhD on the Mycenaean textile industry at the University of Salzburg in 2000, supervised by Sigrid Deger-Jalkotzy and Oswald Panagl, she worked for the Austrian Academy of Sciences' Mycenaean Commission and as a Carlsberg postdoctoral researcher at the University of Copenhagen. She became a research professor in 2009 and subsequently a full professor (2017–present) in the SAXO Institute for the study of prehistoric and classical archaeology, ethnology, Classics and history, where she is a member of the National Danish Research Foundation's Centre for Textile Research; from 2005 to 2016 she was Director of this research centre. She has received numerous high-profile awards, including the Iris Foundation Award for Outstanding Mid-Career Scholars (2009), the Humboldt Foundation's Anneliese Maier Award (2013), and Queen Margrethe II's Science Prize (2019), and is a member of the Order des Palmes académiques. She is also a member of the Royal Danish Academy and the European Academy of Sciences and Arts, is the Scandinavian representative on the Comité International Permanent d’Études Mycéniennes and a corresponding member of the Austrian Academy of Sciences, and sits on the Board of Directors of the Velux Foundations. In September 2020 she was elected President of the Royal Danish Academy.

== Research ==
Nosch's main area of expertise is in the study of textile production in Mycenaean Greece, based on archaeological finds, textual evidence from the Linear B tablets, and experimental archaeology; she has published widely on the interpretation of Linear B tablets referring to textiles, the operation of the textile industry, the wider Mycenaean economy, and Mycenaean religion. Nosch has also participated in and directed interdisciplinary research projects on a wide range of aspects of textile production in the classical Greek and Roman worlds, the ancient Near East, and medieval and early modern Europe, and has edited numerous volumes on the cross-cultural study of textiles, as well as working on the use of textiles as metaphors in literary works.

== Selected publications ==
=== Mycenaean textiles and economy ===
- Marie-Louise Nosch, „Acquisition and Distribution: ta-ra-si-ja in the Mycenaean Textile Industry“ in C. Gillis, Ch. Risberg & B. Sjöberg (eds), Trade and Production in Premonetary Greece. Acquisition and Distribution. Proceedings of the 6th International Workshop, Athens 1996. SIMA Pocket-book 154 (2000), 43–61.
- Marie-Louise Nosch, „The Women at work in the Linear B Tablets“ in A. Strömberg & L. Larsson Lovén (eds), Gender, Culture and Religion in Antiquity. Proceedings of the second Nordic symposium on women's lives in Antiquity, Helsinki, 20–22 October 2000. SIMA, Pocket-book 166 (2003), 12–26.
- Marie-Louise Nosch, „Scribe 103 and the Mycenaean Textile Industry at Knossos: The Lc(1) and Od(1) Sets“, Minos 37-38 (2002-2003) [2006], 121–142. With Richard Firth.
- Marie-Louise Nosch, The Knossos Od Series. An Epigraphical Study, Veröffentlichungen der Mykenische Kommission Band 25, Mykenische Studien 20, Österreichische Akademie der Wissenschaften, Philosophisch-historische Klasse, Denkschriften, 347. Band (2007).
- Marie-Louise Nosch, “Administrative Practices in Mycenaean palace administration and economy” in A. Sacconi, M. del Freo, L. Godart & M. Negri (eds), Colloquium Romanum. Atti del XII Colloquio Internazionale di Micenologia, Roma 20-25 febbraio 2006, Pasiphae. Rivista di Filologia e Antichità egee 2 (2008), 595–604.

=== Mycenaean religion ===
- Marie-Louise Nosch, „Cloth in the Cult“ in R. Hägg & R. Laffineur (eds), Potnia. Deities and Religion in the Aegean Bronze Age. 8th International Aegean Conference, University of Göteborg, 12–15 April 2000, Aegaeum 22 (2001), 471–477. With Massimo Perna.
- Marie-Louise Nosch,”Artemis in the Mediterranean Bronze Age”, in Tobias Fischer-Hansen and Birte Poulsen (eds), From Artemis to Diana. The Goddess of Animals and People, Danish Studies in Classical Archaeology, ACTA HYPERBOREA 12, Museum Tusculanum Press, Copenhagen (2009), 21-39

=== Ancient Near Eastern textiles ===
- Richard Firth & Marie-Louise Nosch, “Spinning and Weaving Wool in Ur III Administrative Texts” Journal of Cuneiform Studies 64 (2012), 67-84
- Henriette Koefoed, Marie-Louise Nosch, Eva Andersson Strand (eds.) Textile Production and Consumption in the Ancient Near East, Ancient Textiles Series 12, Oxbow Books, Oxford (2013)

=== Classical Greek and Roman textiles ===
- Marie-Louise Nosch (ed.), Wearing the Cloak. Dressing the Soldier in Roman Times. Ancient Textiles Series 10 (2011) (150 pages)
- Mary Harlow & Marie-Louise Nosch (eds.), Greek and Roman Textiles and Dress: an interdisciplinary anthology. Ancient Textiles Series 19 (2014). Oxbow Books, Oxford (423 pages)

=== Experimental archaeology ===
- Marie-Louise Nosch, "With a Little Help from my Friends: Investigation Mycenaean Textiles with the help from Scandinavian Experimental Archaeology", in METRON. Measuring the Aegean Bronze Age. Proceedings of the 9th International Aegean Conference / 9e Rencontre égéenne internationale, Yale University, 18–21 April 2002, edited by Karen Polinger Foster and Robert Laffineur, Aegaeum 24 (2003), 197-205 and table XLV. Co-author Eva Andersson.
- Marie-Louise Nosch, „L’archéologie expérimentale et les tests systématiques d’outils de la production textile”, in F. Blondé (ed.), L'artisanat en Grèce ancienne, filières de production, table ronde, École française d’Athènes, octobre 2007 (2016), 193–209.

=== Medieval and early modern European textiles ===
- Kathrine Vestergård and Marie-Louise B. Nosch (eds), The Medieval Broadcloth: Changing Trends in Fashions, Manufacturing, and Consumption, Ancient Textiles Series 6, Oxbow Books (2009)
- Fashionable Encounters. Perspectives and Trends in Textiles and Dress in the Early Modern Nordic World. Ancient Textiles Series 14, Oxbow Books, Oxford (2014), edited by Tove Engelhardt Mathiasen, Marie-Louise Nosch, Maj Ringgaard, Kirsten Toftegaard, Mikkel Venborg Pedersen.

=== Cross-cultural studies of ancient textiles ===
- C. Gillis & M.-L. B. Nosch (eds), Ancient Textiles. Production, Craft and Society. Proceedings of the First International Conference on Ancient textiles, held at Lund, Sweden and Copenhagen, Denmark on March 19–23, 2003. Ancient Textiles Series 1, Oxbow Books, Oxford (2007).
- M. Gleba, C. Munkholt, M.-L. Nosch (eds.) Dressing the Past. Ancient Textiles Series 3 (2008).
- Cécile Michel & Marie-Louise Nosch (eds.), Textile Terminologies in the Ancient Near East and Mediterranean from the Third to the First Millennia BC, Ancient Textiles Series 8, Oxbow Books, Oxford (2010) 444 pages.
- Mary Harlow, Cécile Michel & Marie-Louise Nosch (eds.), Prehistoric, Ancient Near Eastern and Aegean Textiles and Dress: an interdisciplinary anthology. Ancient Textiles Series 18. (2014) Oxbow Books, Oxford (320 pages)
- Marie-Louise Nosch, Zhao Feng and Lotika Varadarajan (eds.) Global Textile Encounters. Ancient Textiles Series 20. Oxbow Books, Oxford – Primus Editor, New Delhi – Donghua University Press, Shanghai (2014). (312 pages)
- Eva Andersson & Marie-Louise Nosch (eds.) Tools, Textiles and Contexts, Ancient Textiles Series 21, Oxbow (2015) (402 p)
- Kerstin Dross-Krüpe and M.-L. Nosch (eds.) Textiles. Trade and Theories, from the Ancient Near East to the Mediterranean. Karum – Emporion – Forum. Beiträge zur Wirtschafts-, Rechts- und Sozialgeschichte des östlichen Mittelmeerraums und Altvorderasiens. Band 2. Ugarit-Verlag, Münster (2016)

=== Textiles in literature ===
- G. Fanfani, M. Harlow, M.-L. Nosch (eds) Spinning Fates and the Song of the Loom: the use of textiles, clothing and cloth production as metaphor, symbol and narrative device in Greek and Latin literature. Ancient Textiles Series 24, Oxbow Books, Oxford (2016). (350 p)
