= Young Academy of Denmark =

- Det Unge Akademi

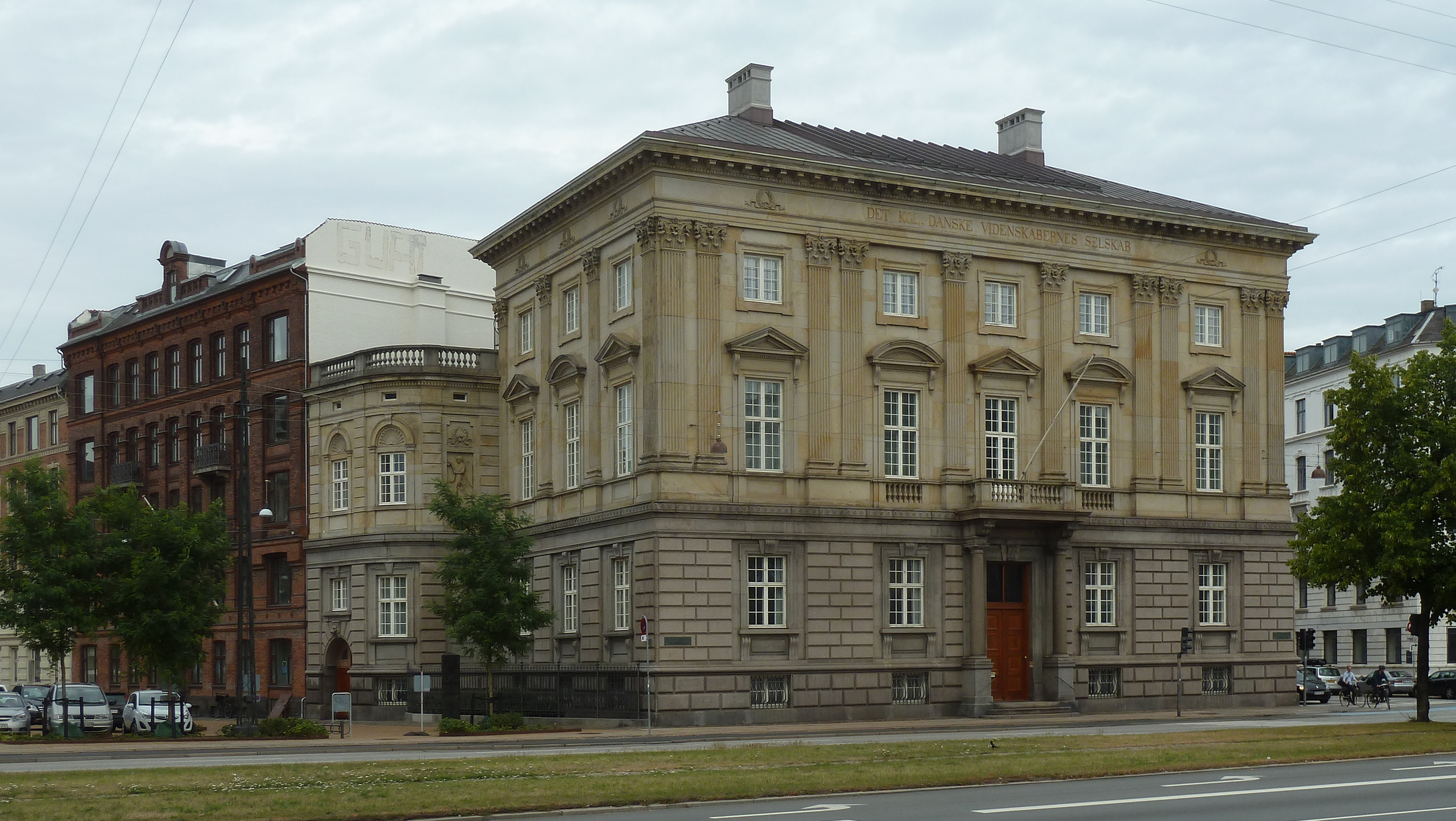
- The building on H.C. Andersens Boulevard.
- Formation: 2011; 15 years ago
- Type: Academy of Sciences
- Legal status: Academy
- Purpose: Scientific forum for young scientists in Denmark
- Headquarters: Copenhagen, Denmark
- Members: 40 (full capacity)
- Chairman / Vice-chairman: Rune Busk Damgaard / Birgitte Beck Pristed (2023)
- Website: youngacademy.dk

The Young Academy of Denmark (Danish: Det Unge Akademi, DUA) is an independent Science Academy under the Royal Danish Academy of Sciences and Letters and was established in 2011 as a scientific forum for young, talented researchers in Denmark. The academy is interdisciplinary and deals with research and educational policy, dissemination of research and interdisciplinary collaboration. The members meet at the Royal Danish Academy of Sciences and Letters' domicile at the corner of H. C. Andersens Boulevard and Dantes Plads in central Copenhagen approximately once a month. On average, eight members are admitted per year and membership is limited to five years.

== Organization ==
The Young Academy of Denmark aims to strengthen primary research and interdisciplinary exchange. Members are active in Danish academia, and typically apply for membership in The Young Academy 3–7 years after obtaining a Doctorate.

The Young Academy of Denmark is governed by its council, which consists of five members: the chairman, the vice-chairman and one representative from each of three standing committees found within the academy. The council is elected by the members for one year at a time.

The Young Academy has three standing committees:

• The committee on Research Policy: The Committee deals with the political frameworks and issues that influence the work of younger researchers in Denmark.

• The committee on Scientific Communication: The committee works to disseminate research widely to the public and to inspire young people to choose a research career.

• The committee on Interdisciplinary Collaboration: The Committee works with initiatives that strengthen interdisciplinary cooperation among the members of the Young Academy of Denmark.

All members of the Young Academy of Denmark are required to be members of a committee and participate actively in the committee work. The Royal Danish Academy of Sciences and Letters supervises the general work of the Young Academy of Denmark, and the Young Academy of Denmark is assisted in its work by the administrative office of the Royal Danish Academy of Sciences and Letters.

== Logo of the Young Academy of Denmark ==
The logo of the Young Academy of Denmark is designed with inspiration from the Seal of the Royal Danish Academy of Sciences and Letters. The Gryphon is part of the Royal Danish Academy of Sciences and Letters seal, and is the main focus of the logo of the Young Academy of Denmark.

== Chairmanship of the Young Academy of Denmark (chair, vicechair) ==
- 2011/2012: Emil Bjerrum-Bohr, Petrine Wellendorph
- 2013: Rubina Raja, Thomas Bjørnskov Poulsen
- 2014: Jacob Sherson, Pia Quist
- 2015: Karen Gram-Skjoldager, Steffen Dalsgaard
- 2016: Nikolaj Zinner, Tine Jess
- 2017: Mikkel Bille, Nikolaj Zinner
- 2018: Kristine Niss, Birgitte Rahbek Kornum
- 2019: Henrik Dimke, Kristine Niss
- 2020: Henrik Dimke, Karen Vallgårda
- 2021: Karen Vallgårda, Niels Martin Møller
- 2022: Kristoffer Kropp, Kirsten Marie Ørnsbjerg Jensen
- 2023: Rune Busk Damgaard, Birgitte Beck Pristed
