= Copenhagen Business School =

Business school

Coordinates: 55°40′53.85″N 12°31′47.04″E

- Handelshøjskolen i København
- Motto: Where University Means Business
- Type: Public University
- Established: 1917; 109 years ago
- Affiliations: EQUIS; AACSB; AMBA; CEMS; PIM
- Budget: Funding DKK 1.357 billion
- Chairman: Torben Möger Pedersen
- President: Peter Møllgaard
- Dean: Søren Hvidkjær and Gregor Halff
- Director: Kirsten Winther Jørgensen
- Academic staff: 675 (full time), 774 (part time)
- Administrative staff: 675
- Students: 19,708 (3,984 foreign students)
- Doctoral students: 224
- Location: Frederiksberg and Copenhagen, Denmark
- Campus: Solbjerg Plads (primary), Dalgas Have, Kilen (The Wedge) Flintholm and Porcelænshaven
- Colors: CBS Blue
- Website: www.cbs.dk/en
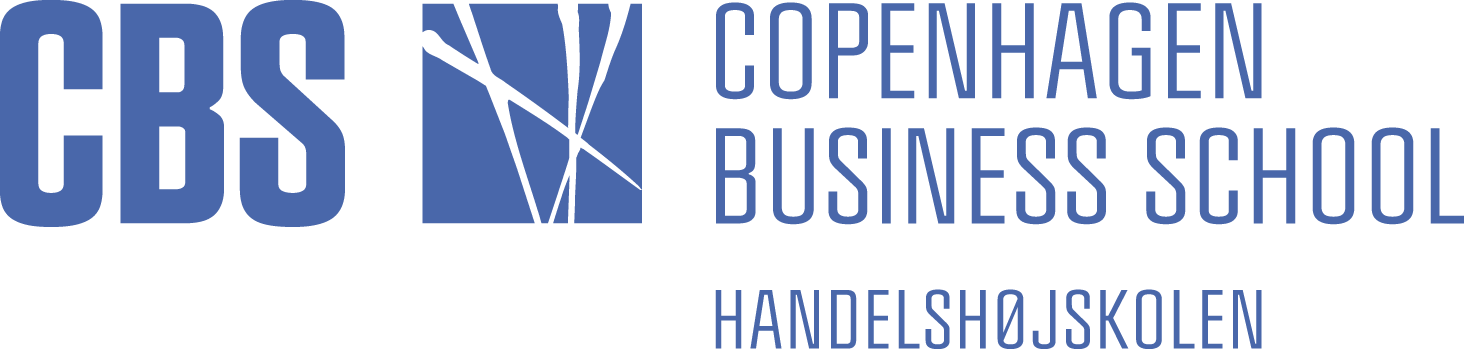

Copenhagen Business School (Danish: Handelshøjskolen i København), often abbreviated and referred to as CBS (also in Danish), is a public university situated in Copenhagen, Denmark. Founded in 1917, It is considered one of the most prestigious business schools in Western Europe and the world.

CBS offers a wide range of undergraduate and graduate programmes within business, typically with an interdisciplinary and international focus. It is accredited by EQUIS (European Quality Improvement System), AMBA (Association of MBAs), as well as AACSB (Association to Advance Collegiate Schools of Business), making it one of the few schools worldwide to hold the "triple-crown" accreditation, and along with Aarhus University, School of Business and Social Sciences, the only two in Denmark.

Since the Danish Universities Act of 2003, CBS has had a board of directors with an external majority. The Board of Directors appoints the President of CBS, who is currently Peter Møllgaard.

== History ==
CBS was established in 1917 by the Danish Society for the Advancement of Business Education (now known as FUHU), which is a private educational institution. During the 1920s the activities were gradually formalised into a separate business school. By 1920 accounting had become the first full study programme. In 1922 the business school was spun off as an independent institution, and in 1927 it moved to new premises at Julius Thomsens Plads in Frederiksberg, where it continued to rent buildings from FUHU. FUHU retained strong influence over the school’s governance for decades through representation in its governing council.

In 1965 the business school became integrated into the Danish educational system as an institution of higher education. From that point its operating expenses were fully covered by the state, and the school was integrated into the national system of higher education while retaining its own legal personality.

From the late 1980s the school undertook a large physical and organisational expansion, gradually consolidating its campus in Frederiksberg. Dalgas Have, designed by Henning Larsen and completed in 1988, gave CBS a modern teaching complex. The opening of the main campus building at Solbjerg Plads in 1999–2000, designed by Vilhelm Lauritzen Architects, brought most activities together within walking distance and created what is now considered the heart of the university.

The school’s identity and name also evolved. Historically known in Danish as Handelshøjskolen i København, it began using the parallel English name “Copenhagen Business School (CBS)” in 1988, reflecting increasing internationalisation of its programmes and partnerships. Since 2003 the English-language name has been the institution’s primary designation, and CBS is today formally counted among the eight Danish universities.

== Presidents ==
President	Years
Peter Møllgaard	2024-present
Nikolaj Malchow-Møller	2019–2024
Per Holten-Andersen	2012–2019
Alan Irwin	2011
Johan Roos	2009-2011
Finn Junge-Jensen	1987-2009
Frode Slipsager	1979-1987
Lauge Stetting	1978-1979
Carl E. Sørensen	1975-1978
Jan Kobbernagel	1963-1975
Poul Winding	1957-1963
Christen Møller, Director	1938-1957
Marius Vibæk, Director	1917-1938

== Programme structure ==
CBS offers a comprehensive range of university degrees in economics and business administration. Other programmes combine business studies with social sciences and the humanities, offering education in the fields of IT, philosophy, politics, languages, sociology, communication and others.

The selection of full-time programmes complies with the three levels:

- 3-year bachelor's degree
- 2-year master's degree, awarding the title of Candidatus Mercaturae (Cand.Merc)
- 3-year PhD

CBS also offers part-time and full-time programmes in continuing education:

- Executive Master Programmes
- Full-time MBA
- Diploma programmes and short courses

== Exchange programmes ==
CBS is the Danish member of CEMS - Global Alliance in Management Education and a member of Partnership in International Management (PIM), and focuses on double degree agreements with other top business schools. CBS has exchange and cooperation agreements with 390 universities and business schools around the world, including Bocconi University, Cornell University, University of Pennsylvania, HEC Paris, ESSEC Business School, ESCP Business School, ESADE, among others.

== Rankings ==
Business school rankings

Europe
- QS MBA: 11
- Financial Times MBA: 28

Global
- QS MBA: 24

Academic Ranking of World Universities (Shanghai Ranking)

In 2020 Academic Ranking of World Universities, also known as Shanghai Ranking, CBS ranks #8 in Europe and #30 in the world in the category 'Management'. The ranking is research-focused as it is solely based on refereed research publications and research awards.

QS World University Ranking

In the 2024 QS ranking of the world's top universities for business and management, Copenhagen Business School ranks #18 in the world. This ranking aims to assess institutions’ overall performance and reputation in the business and management field (at both undergraduate and graduate levels) and is headed by Harvard Business School, followed by INSEAD and London Business School.

Eduniversal

The French ratings agency Eduniversal ranked Copenhagen Business School the #1 business school in the world in 2014, ahead of London Business School and Harvard Business School. This ranking is based on the recommendations of deans and presidents of leading business schools from more than 150 countries. In 2023, Eduniversal ranked CBS as #4 business school in the world, behind of MIT Sloan School of Management, Harvard Business School, and London Business School.

Corporate Knights

In the 2015 Better World MBA Ranking, which is published by Corporate Knights, the Copenhagen Business School MBA program ranks #3 globally.

QS Global MBA

The QS Global 200 Business School Report 2014/15 ranked the Copenhagen Business School MBA program #12 in Europe. The same report ranked the Copenhagen Business School MBA program in the top cluster of MBA programs globally. The top cluster, of four clusters total, comprises 20 North American MBA programs, 14 European MBA programs, and 4 Asia Pacific MBA programs.

Bloomberg Businessweek

The Copenhagen Business School MBA program has been ranked #28 by Bloomberg Businessweek in its International Full-time MBA Ranking 2015. This ranking does not include the Business schools in the US.

Financial Times

The Financial Times ranked Copenhagen Business School #50 worldwide in its Masters in Management 2020 ranking. The Financial Times also ranked the CBS Executive MBA program #62 in the world and #31 in Europe in 2015. The Copenhagen Business School MBA program has been ranked in the Financial Times's list of Top 100 MBAs in 2021.

The Aspen Institute

The Aspen Institute's "Beyond Grey Pinstripes" bi-annual report ranked the Copenhagen Business School MBA program #43 globally (#7 in Europe) in its 2011-2012 report and #63 globally (#9 in Europe) in its 2009-2010 report.

Triple Crown of Accreditation

Copenhagen Business School is accredited by the Association to Advance Collegiate Schools of Business, the Association of MBAs, and the European Quality Improvement System. Copenhagen Business School and Aarhus University are the only two business schools in Denmark, and two of 57 business schools globally to earn Triple accreditation. Copenhagen Business School earned the AACSB accreditation in 2011, the AMBA accreditation in 2007 and the EQUIS accreditation in 2000. In 2015 CBS received the EQUIS seal of approval and thereby remains among the best 1% of business schools worldwide in terms of triple-crown accreditation.

== Notable alumni and faculty ==
CBS has produced numerous notable alumni in business and politics, both in Denmark and internationally.

- Søren Skou, CEO of A.P Moller-Maersk
- Jonas Deichmann, German adventurer and extreme athlete.
- Lise Kingo, executive director of the United Nations Global Compact
- Fritz Henrik Schur Junior, Chairman of Ørsted
- David Heinemeier Hansson, creator of Ruby on Rails
- Kasper Rørsted, CEO of Adidas
- Hannibal Muammar Gaddafi, son of former Libyan leader Muammar Gaddafi
- Jacob Schram, CEO of Norwegian Air
- Lars Dalgaard, founder of SuccessFactors
- Jens-Otto Paludan, former CEO of Universal Music in Denmark

Prominent alumni also include Tarja Cronberg, Jakob Ellemann-Jensen, Sharmi Albrechtsen, Lene Børglum, Michael Brockenhuus-Schack, and Soulaima Gourami. The school has also prominent faculty members such as Danish organization theorist Nicolai Foss and legal sociologist Poul F. Kjaer.

== Facilities ==
=== CBS Campus ===
CBS is an urban university primarily located in four modern buildings in Frederiksberg, close to the center of Copenhagen. The main complex, Solbjerg Plads, was opened in 2000 and includes 34,000 m^{2} of student and office space surrounded by gardens and outdoor living space. Designed by Vilhelm Lauritzer Architects, the complex consists of interconnected concrete, glass and tile-sided buildings of varying heights that house student auditoriums, faculty office space, a cafeteria, the main library, a student bar and the campus bookstore.

Dalgas Have, opened in 1989 and designed by Henning Larsen Architects, is the oldest building currently in use. Owned by the Danish Pension Fund for Engineers and leased by CBS, the building includes 20,000 m^{2} of student classrooms, study space and offices distributed around a three-story 175 m long arcade. At the midpoint of the arcade a two-story semi-circular cafeteria sits below a semi-circular library.

Kilen (The Wedge) was opened in 2006 and includes 10,000 m^{2} of student classrooms, study spaces, and offices for research and administration. Designed by Lundgaard & Tranberg Architects, the four-story wedge-shaped building features a large oval-shaped atrium that extends the height of the building. The exterior is covered with full-story screens made of wood, matte glass or copper, which rotate in response to the Sun and weather. Kilen has been the recipient of numerous architecture and design awards such as a RIBA European Award in 2006.

Porcelænshaven, the fourth main building that comprises the CBS campus, is leased by CBS from the Danish Society for the Advancement of Business Education. Formerly the Royal Copenhagen Porcelain Factory, the factory has been converted into 20,000 m^{2} of student classrooms, study spaces, offices, and a student residence. A central feature of the building, a 1,000 m^{2} main hall used for large events, stands in the old location of the factory kiln hall. As part of the factory conversion, Henning Larsen Architects transformed the old raw material storage building into 3,800 m^{2} of modern study space.

CBS campus buildings reflect characteristic Scandinavian style and have been recognized by Frederiksberg Municipality earning an Award for Good and Beautiful Building in 2006 and 2009. The four main buildings are within walking distance and located along three consecutive stations on the Copenhagen Metro from Lindevang Station (Dalgas Have) to Frederiksberg Station (Solbjerg Plads).

== Student life ==
=== Student organizations ===
CBS has numerous student-led organizations spanning professional fields such as consulting, finance, and politics, as well as interest-based areas including sports, music, and wine.

== See also ==
- Copenhagen Consensus Centre
- Offshoring Research Network
- List of business schools in Europe
- List of universities and colleges in Denmark
- Open access in Denmark
- LiHE
