= Sharmi Albrechtsen =

American-Indian journalist

- Born: Canada
- Education: Temple University; Copenhagen Business School
- Occupations: Author journalist
- Spouse: Jesper Neilsen
- Children: One
- Writing career
- Notable work: A Piece of Danish Happiness
- Website: happydanes.com

Sharmi Albrechtsen is a Canadian-born American–Indian journalist and author known for her blog Happy Danes on the official site, Blogging Denmark. She has written a book, A Piece of Danish Happiness, which explores why the Danish people are considered the happiest in the world, according to some sources, including the 2012 Gallup Poll taken by the United Nations. Albrechtsen attributes this happiness to the cultural Laws of Jante, a state of "Hygge" meaning being together comfortably, Denmark's welfare system, and factors intrinsic to being happy. Her writing infuses her personal story, and in 2012, she told her story to Oprah Winfrey during a televised Lifeclass in Toronto.

== Personal life ==
Albrechtsen has received her undergraduate degree from Temple University and an MBA from Copenhagen Business School. She is married to Jesper Nielsen and lives in Charlottenlund, Denmark.
