= Francesco Sannino =

Italian theoretical physicist

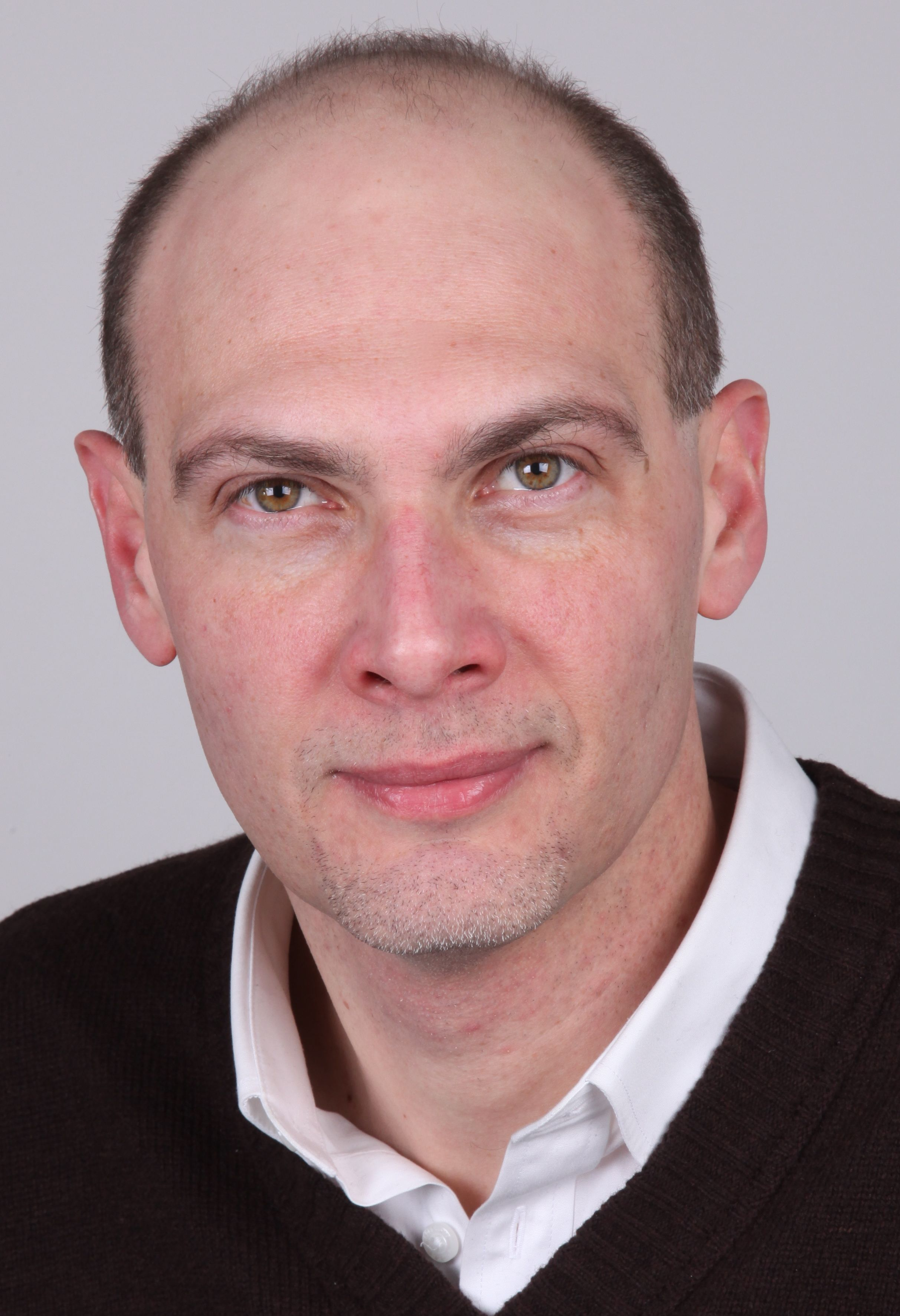
- Born: 9 February 1968 (age 58); Naples, Italy
- Education: Syracuse University, University of Naples
- Scientific career
- Fields: Theoretical physicist
- Workplaces: University of Southern Denmark, University of Naples
- Doctoral advisor: Joseph Schechter

Francesco Sannino (born 9 February 1968) is an Italian theoretical physicist and a professor at both the University of Southern Denmark and the University of Naples Federico II. He conducts research in the topics of effective field theories and their applications to strongly coupled theories such as quantum chromodynamics. He also researches in beyond standard model physics and quantum field theory.

After his studies at the University of Naples, Federico II in 1992, he enrolled in PhD programmes at Syracuse University and University of Naples, obtaining the doctoral degree in 1997.

In 1997, he obtained a research fellowship from Yale University and in 2000 he moved to NORDITA. In 2004 he became associate professor at the Niels Bohr Institute in Denmark. In 2007 he has been a paid associate at CERN while becoming full professor at the University of Southern Denmark. In 2020 he became full professor at the University of Naples Federico II.

In 2009 the research centre CP3-Origins at University of Southern Denmark was formed under his leadership by the Danish Research Foundation. In 2010 he was awarded the EliteForsk Prize for researchers by the Danish Ministry of Science.
