= Adrian Favell =

British sociologist

Adrian Favell FBA is Professor of Social and Political Theory and Founding Director of the Radical Humanities Laboratory at University College Cork. He was previously chair in Sociology and Social Theory at the University of Leeds, where he is now a visiting professor in the School of Geography. He is also a Professorial Academic Associate of the Sainsbury Institute for the Study of Japanese Arts and Cultures. He has served as an associate editor of Journal of Ethnic and Migration Studies and on the editorial committee of Journal of Common Market Studies, and in 2021 was elected to the British Academy.

== Academic career ==
Adrian Favell was formerly Professor of Sociology at Sciences Po. Before that he was the Director of the Centre for Regional and Global Ethnographies and Professor of European and International Studies at Aarhus University and Associate and then Full Professor of Sociology at UCLA.

His research in migration studies has contributed to debates on citizenship, multiculturalism and integration, intra-EU migration, and high skilled migration. He is best known as the leading critic of the immigrant integration paradigm as a colonial feature of advanced liberal democracies. He argues for the necessity of sophisticated comparative approaches, which recognise the asymmetry between nation-state contexts of immigration, particularly in comparisons between Britain and France, or European nations and the US and Canada. In later work on the international governance of migration and mobilities, he has engaged in collaborative studies on South America and East Asia. His work on intra-EU "Eurostars", which uses ethnography as a method, is widely noted as having pioneered study on the everyday consequences of European integration, particularly on younger generations of highly mobile European citizens.

His book, Before and After Superflat, is the first academic history in English of contemporary art in Japan since 1990.

== Works ==
- Favell, Adrian (2001). Philosophies of Integration: Immigration and the Idea of Citizenship in France and Britain (2nd ed.). London: Palgrave. ISBN 978-0-312-17609-9.
- Favell, Adrian; Michael Peter Smith, eds. (2006). The Human Face of Global Mobility: International Highly Skilled Migration in Europe, North America and the Asia Pacific. New Brunswick, NJ: Transaction. ISBN 978-1412805209.
- Favell, Adrian (2008). Eurostars and Eurocities: Free Movement and Mobility in an Integrating Europe. Oxford: Blackwell. ISBN 978-1-4051-3404-0.
- Favell, Adrian; Virginie Guiraudon, eds. (2011). Sociology of the European Union. London: Palgrave. ISBN 9780230207110.
- Favell, Adrian (2012). Before and After Superflat: A Short History of Japanese Contemporary Art 1990-2011. Hong Kong: Blue Kingfisher/DAP. ISBN 9789881506412.
- Favell, Adrian (2015). Immigration, Integration and Mobility: New Agendas in Migration Studies. Essays 1998-2014. Cholcester: ECPR. ISBN 9781907301728.
- Favell, Adrian (2022). The Integration Nation: Immigration and Colonial Power in Liberal Democracies. Cambridge: Polity Press. ISBN 9781509549399.
