= Tiercering =

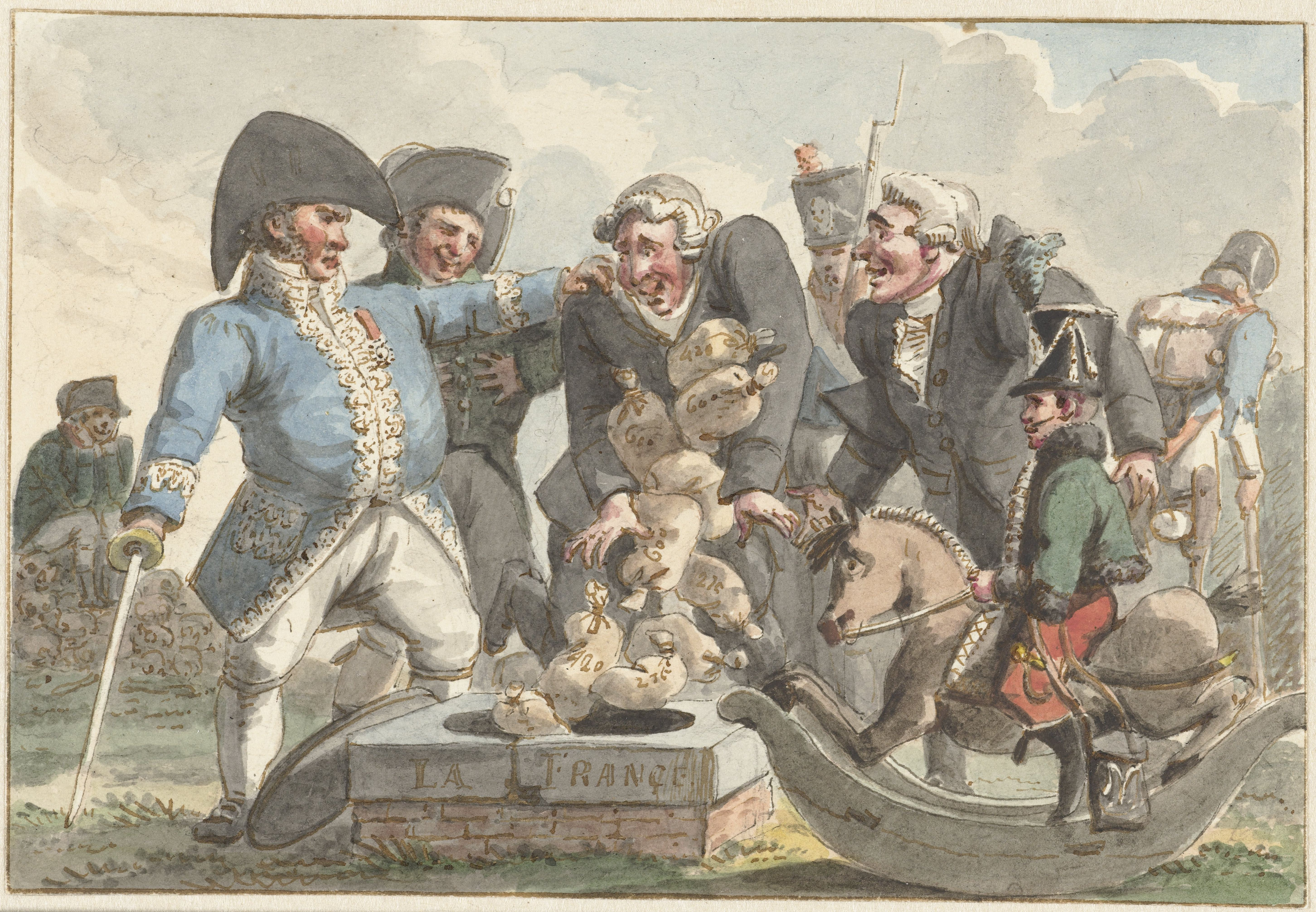

The Tiercering (from the French word tiercé, meaning a third) refers to a historical event in the Netherlands on July 9, 1810, when Emperor Napoleon imposed a reduction of interest to one third of the norm on Dutch government bonds. Because of economic problems and general war conditions, the Kingdom of Holland, which had just been annexed by France, was receiving less income than it was paying out in interest, and therefore the Treasury could no longer bear to pay the interest rates on perpetual bonds.

Napoleon determined that only one third of the actual interest due would be paid to investors. In the previous years 1808 and 1809, the government had defaulted on the bonds altogether and no interest at all had been paid.

The tiercering was a logical solution to an ever-increasing problem with national debt. In 1809 the government received only 33 million guilders in revenue, while the interest due on bonds was approximately 39 million guilders. This situation was ended by the tiercering, so that in 1810 only 13 million guilders needed to be paid on interest payments for a national debt of 1.232 billion guilders.

Many wealthy citizens, pensioners, local councils and charities were dealt a heavy blow by the ruling. Local charity organizations which required a large portion of their assets to be invested in government bonds, were the hardest hit and the tiercering caused their financial revenue to be reduced by two thirds.

The tiercering was continued in 1814 under King William I after Napoleon was defeated. On May 14, 1814, the National Debt law was enacted. Under this law, all running debts of the Dutch state were converted to two parts; an "actual liability", and a "delayed liability"; of which the actual liability would be held at a new standard rate of 2.5 percent. Per year, 4 million guilders would be carried over from the "delayed debt" to the "actual debt", and for this complicated amortization, a new office was set up called "'s Lands Amortisatiekas". From the new real debt only one third of the interest would be paid.

19th century NL bonds:	1795	1800	1810	1815	1840	1850
National Debt	766	+/- 975	+/- 1232	1726	2250	1230
Interest burden	22.7	34.3	41.5	14.7	35.5	+/- 35
Interest rate paid	2.96%	3.52%	3.37%	0.85%	1.58%	2.85%
