= Independent Research Fund Denmark =

Danish Research and Advisory Agency

Independent Research Fund Denmark (often referred to as DFF, and known as the Danish Council for Independent Research until 2017) is a public fund. The Fund’s secretariat forms part of the Danish Agency for Higher Education and Science and supports the Fund’s activities.

Independent Research Fund Denmark finances research of the highest international quality and strengthens pioneering, curiosity-driven research in Denmark. The Fund makes risk-willing investments in research based on researchers’ own best ideas within and across scientific fields. Furthermore, the Fund aims to promote the internationalisation of research and to support both early-career and established researchers. Each year, the Fund also allocates resources to strategic initiatives within politically determined themes— such as green research, research on children and young people, and clinical research — through its thematic committees, which are appointed for one year at a time.

In addition to its core task of funding research, Independent Research Fund Denmark provides scientific advice to the minister, the Danish Parliament, and the wider Danish and international research landscape. This is grounded in the expertise and disciplinary diversity of the Fund’s board and council members, all of whom are recognised and active researchers.

== Organisation ==
Independent Research Fund Denmark consists of a Board, five research councils, and a cross-council committee, comprising a total of 84 permanent members. In addition, a number of ad hoc members are appointed annually to distribute politically determined thematic funds. All members are recognised and active researchers.

== The Board of Directors ==
The Board of Directors of Independent Research Fund Denmark consists of nine recognised researchers appointed by the Minister for Higher Education and Science through an open call. Since 2024, Professor Søren Serritzlew has served as Chair of the Board. The Board represents Independent Research Fund Denmark at the political and strategic level and, together with the research councils, provides scientific advice to the Minister for Higher Education and Science, the Danish Parliament, and the Government. The Board appoints members of the research councils and the cross-council committee, decides on the allocation of the Fund’s resources among the research councils, and does not itself hold grant-awarding competence.

== The five research councils ==
The five research councils of Independent Research Fund Denmark hold grant-awarding competence and support specific research activities initiated by researchers. They also contribute to the Fund’s scientific advice within their respective disciplinary domains. Each council is responsible for the interdisciplinarity inherent in its subject area.

The members of the councils are appointed by the Board through open calls, ensuring that the five councils collectively cover all areas of scientific research.

=== The five councils are ===
- DFF | Humanities
- DFF | Natural Sciences
- DFF | Social Sciences
- DFF | Medical Sciences
- DFF | Technology and Production Sciences

== Cross-council Committee ==
Independent Research Fund Denmark emphasises that interdisciplinary applications have equal opportunities to receive funding as single-discipline applications, and supports both types of high-quality projects.

Applications spanning more than one council’s remit are handled jointly by the councils and coordinated by the DFF | Cross-Council Committee, which consists of the chairs of the five research councils. The committee’s work is supported by expert members from the councils.

== Thematic Research - Expert committees ==
Independent Research Fund Denmark’s thematic expert committees allocate funding to specific research activities within politically determined themes, provided that special appropriations have been made available through the research reserve of the Finance Act. The thematic committees consist of a varying number of members appointed by the Board in their personal capacity. A substantial proportion of these members are employed at foreign institutions and are appointed through open calls. The committees are established for one year at a time.

== Supporting independent research ==
Each year, Independent Research Fund Denmark processes approximately 4,000 applications and awards research grants totalling around DKK 2 billion (2025 figures) to about 500 groundbreaking research projects across all scientific disciplines. These resources are distributed through open competition, where applications are evaluated solely on the basis of their scientific quality and the applicant's qualifications to carry out the proposed project.

== Funding for politically determined themes ==
Since 2018, Independent Research Fund Denmark has, in addition to awarding funds for free and curiosity-driven research, also allocated funding within politically determined themes through annual political agreements on the distribution of the research reserve. These thematic funds supplement free, independent research. The difference between the two is that thematic funds are awarded under a specific politically determined theme, whereas free funds are open to ideas across all subjects and scientific domains. For both free and thematic funds, applications are based on researchers’ own best ideas within the relevant field or theme.
