= Royal Danish Academy of Sciences and Letters =

Danish non-governmental organization for the advancement of science

The Royal Danish Academy of Sciences and Letters
- Det Kongelige Danske Videnskabernes Selskab

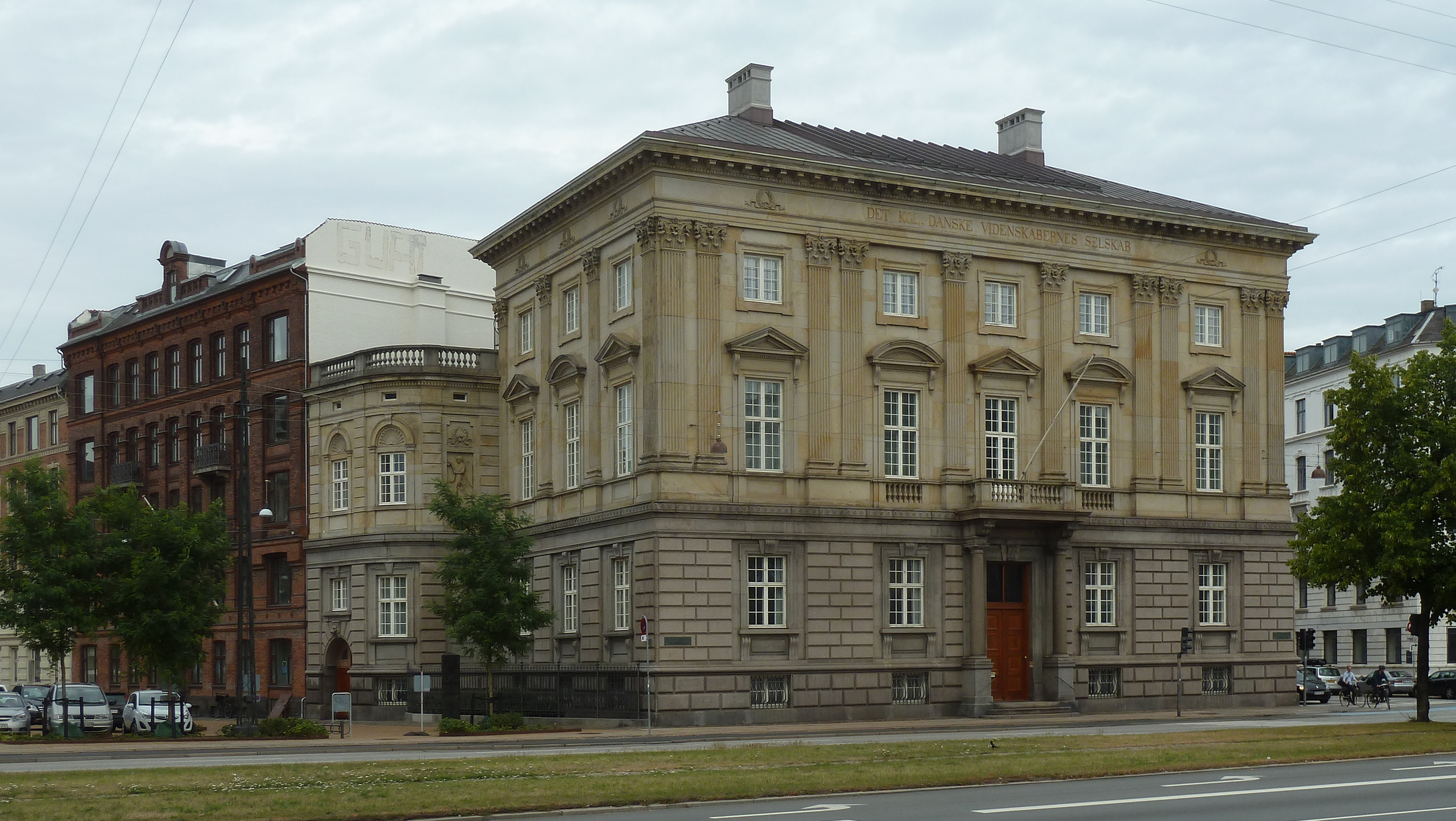
- The building on H.C. Andersens Boulevard
- Formation: 13 November 1742; 283 years ago
- Founders: Johan Ludvig Holstein; Hans Gram; Erik Pontoppidan; Henrik Hielmstierne
- Type: Non-governmental science academy
- Headquarters: Copenhagen, Denmark
- Location: H.C. Andersens Boulevard 35, 1553 København V
- Website: www.royalacademy.dk

The Royal Danish Academy of Sciences and Letters (Danish: Det Kongelige Danske Videnskabernes Selskab or Videnskabernes Selskab) is a Danish academy of science. The Royal Danish Academy was established on 13 November 1742, and was created with the purpose of strengthening the position of Science in Denmark as well as promoting interdisciplinary understanding.

The Royal Danish Academy works as a body of cooperation and a meeting place for prominent scientists from all areas of basic scientific research. Its core activities consist of organizing the biweekly meetings for the academy's members, publishing scientific works, advising, and communicating, organizing and conducting events and lectures of a scientific character (e.g. public lectures and symposiums) as well as participating in international cooperation with other scientific academies and scientific organizations, such as ISC and EASAC.

Since 1745, the Royal Danish Academy has had its own publishing company that is still, to this day, publishing scientific books, currently via four different series, all under the main title of Scientia Danica. A year after the publication of a scientific work, the publication is made available on the Publication Platform of the Royal Academy.

The Royal Danish Academy also administers several foundations and grants that provide financial support for different scientific work, e.g. research stays outside of Denmark.

King Frederik X of Denmark is the Protector of the Royal Danish Academy of Sciences and Letters.

In 2011, the Royal Danish Academy established the Young Academy of Denmark (Danish: Det Unge Akademi or “DUA”) which acts as a scientific forum for excellent young researchers.

== History ==
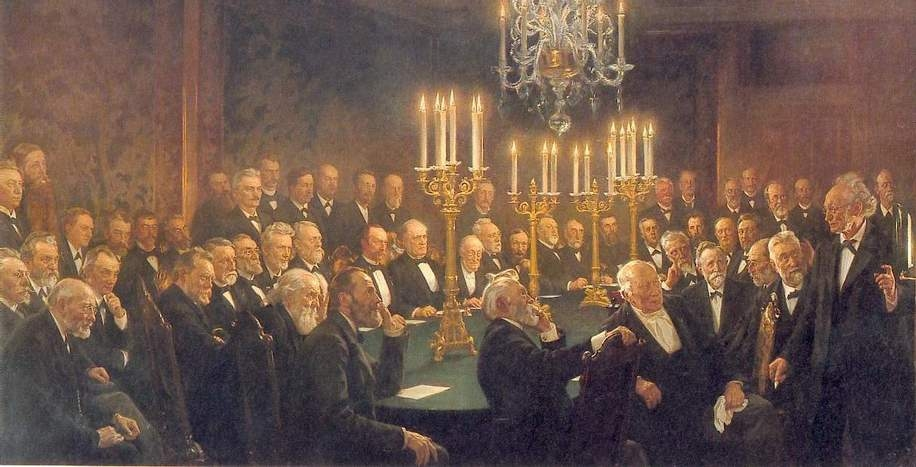
Kroyer's 1897 painting of a meeting of the RDASL, including Frederik VIII

The Royal Danish Academy of Sciences and Letters was established on 13 November 1742, with the wish of creating a “learned society”. Behind the establishment was Johan Ludvig Holstein (Count and titular Privy Councillor), Hans Gram (Counsellor, Royal Historiographer and Professor), Erik Pontoppidan (Professor of Theology) and Henrik Hielmstierne (Secretary of the Danish Chancellery), and the approbation for the establishment was given by King Christian the 6th of Denmark.

Between 1761 and 1843, The Royal Danish Academy undertook a geographical and trigonometrical measuring of Denmark and Schleswig-Holstein that resulted in no less than 24 published maps. Another project of that time was a Danish dictionary which was published in 8 volumes during the time of 1793–1905.

Throughout the years, part of the Royal Danish Academy's work has also consisted in making out prize essays and awarding medals (silver and gold) to scientists based on their solutions. To this very day, the Royal Danish Academy still carries out the awarding of different medals, however not based on prize essays.

From 1855 to 1899, the meetings of the Royal Danish Academy were held at Prinsens Palais (today the National Museum of Denmark, “Nationalmuseet”). Before then, the Royal Academy meetings took place at different venues, e.g. the private homes of some of the members. In 1899, the Royal Danish Academy moved into the new house of the Carlsberg Foundation, located on H.C. Andersens Boulevard in Copenhagen. Both the academy and the Carlsberg Foundation are still located here today. The building was designed by architect Vilhelm Petersen.

In 1876, brewer J.C. Jacobsen established the Carlsberg Foundation with the purpose of promoting science. Today, the Carlsberg Foundation's board of directors consists of five members of the academy, elected by the members themselves.

Marie Skłodowska-Curie was the first female ever to be elected as a member of the Royal Danish Academy of Sciences and Letters. In 1968, the first Danish female, Eli Fischer-Jørgensen, was elected as a member too.

The members of the Royal Academy count several great and prominent scientists’ names, nationally as well as internationally speaking, including Albert Einstein, Charles Darwin, Niels Bohr, H.C. Ørsted and August Krogh.

Since its establishment in 1742, the Royal Danish Academy has kept a historical archive, and because of that, the academy today has a vast collection of scientific records and documents, including portraits of members, handwritten letters and even never before published prize essays as well as a large number of models, diagrams, drawings and other scientific works. In 2019, the entire archives of the Royal Danish Academy were moved to the Danish National Archives (Danish: “Rigsarkivet”) and may be looked up via the public access platform Daisy.

== Members ==
The Royal Danish Academy has about 250 national members and about 250 international members. The members are prominent scientists within both the humanities and social sciences as well as the natural sciences. Each year, a number of new members are elected, and these members will then either belong to the Class of the Humanities and Social Sciences or the Class of Natural Sciences. In even years, 9 new members of the Class of Natural Sciences are elected. In odd years, 6 new members of the Class of Humanities and Social Sciences are elected.

A presidium is elected from among the members and by the members themselves. The presidium is responsible for directing the Royal Danish Academy. It consists of a President (at present Professor Marie Louise Nosch), a Secretary General (at present Professor Thomas Sinkjær), an Editor (at present Professor Marianne Pade) and two Vice Presidents – each being the chairperson of one of the two classes respectively – as well as two class representatives, also one for each class.

Throughout the years, many prominent scientists have been a part of the Royal Danish Academy's presidium, counting no other than Professor Hans Christian Ørsted who acted as the Secretary General of the academy, and Professor Niels Bohr who acted as president from 1939 to 1962.

The presidium of the Royal Danish Academy carries out its work with assistance from the Royal Academy’s secretariat. The secretariat carries out the administrative functions underlying the Royal Danish Academy's purposes.

== See also ==
- Royal Danish Academy of Art
