= Siebke =

Siebke is a German surname. Notable people with the surname include:

- Hans-Christian Siebke (1940–2023), German farmer and politician
- Johan Siebke (1781–1857), German-Norwegian gardener
- Johan Heinrich Spalckhawer Siebke (1816–1875), Norwegian entomologist
