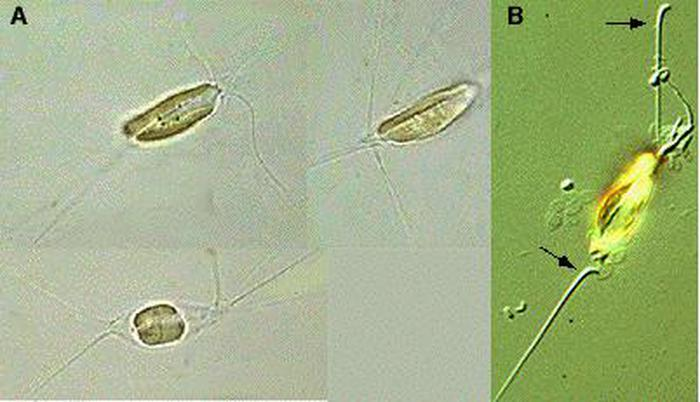
- Braarudosphaera bigelowii

Scientific classification
- Domain: Eukaryota
- Supergroup: Haptista
- Division: Haptophyta
- Class: Prymnesiophyceae
- Order: Braarudosphaerales
- Family: Braarudosphaeraceae
- Genus: Braarudosphaera (Gran & Braarud) Deflandre

Type species
- Braarudosphaera bigelowii (Gran & Braarud) Deflandre

= Braarudosphaera =

Family of algae

Braarudosphaera is a genus of coccolithophores that produce pentagonal structures reminiscent of dodecahedra.

Typically, these are all placed in B. bigelowii; newer research now implies this species is actually at least 4 genotypically distinct species which can be distinguished by the size of their pentaliths.

As of 2026, we know B. bigelowii has a functional nitroplast; however, we are uncertain if other closely related species might have a nitroplast as well.
