= Nordal Wille =

Norwegian botanist (1858–1924)

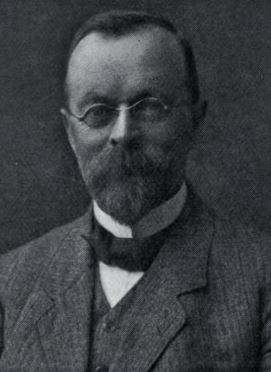
- Wille, circa 1911
- Born: 28 October 1858; Hobøl
- Died: 4 February 1924 (aged 65); Kristiania
- Citizenship: Norwegian
- Scientific career
- Fields: algaeology plant morphology plant anatomy plant physiology
- Workplaces: Royal Frederick University
- Notable students: Haaken Hasberg Gran

Johan Nordal Fischer Wille (28 October 1858 – 4 February 1924) was a Norwegian botanist. He was a professor at the Royal Frederick University from 1893 to his death, founded the laboratory at the University Botanical Garden and co-founded the Natural History Museum.

== Personal life ==
Wille was born in Hobøl as the son of physician Hans Georg Wille (1803–1879) and his wife Ingeborg Fischer (1811–1875). He was a grandnephew of priest and writer Hans Jacob Wille.

He married three times. The first marriage with Anne Koller, a daughter of Carl Theodor Fredrik Koller, lasted from September 1891 to her death in March 1908. During this period he was a brother-in-law of Rasmus Meyer and Gustav Guldberg, who were married to two of Anne's sisters. The second marriage with Ragna Margrethe Knudsen lasted from September 1911 to her death in July 1917, and finally he married Swedish-born school teacher Ester Victoria Svensson in October 1918.

== Career ==
Wille grew up in Hobøl, but eventually moved to Kristiania to take his education. He embarked on an education as a teacher of natural sciences, but became increasingly interested in algae, a field in which there was no adequate education available in Norway. He studied plant morphology, plant anatomy and plant physiology in different European countries, and conducted several field studies. He was a lecturer at the Swedish Museum of Natural History and the Stockholm University between 1883 and 1889. He moved to the Norwegian College of Agriculture in 1889.

In 1893 he was given a newly established professor position at the Royal Frederick University, which also gave him responsibility over the University Botanical Garden at Tøyen. In addition, Wille moved to Tøyen. In 1895 he founded a laboratory there. The founding of the laboratory promoted research among students, which would become important to several later researchers, including Wille's lab assistant from 1894 Haaken Hasberg Gran and, in turn, Gran's assistant Trygve Braarud.

After the death of professor Axel Blytt in 1898, Wille was also given responsibility of the Botanical Museum. The collections of natural history items were located at the university campus in downtown Kristiania, but this locality had become too small. Together with Waldemar Christofer Brøgger, Wille was instrumental in moving the natural history collections to new localities at Tøyen. This was the foundation of the Natural History Museum at the University of Oslo. Later, a larger expansion of the university as a whole became necessary. The locality in downtown Kristiania provided little room for spreading out, so a more peripheral location was debated. Wille lobbied for Tøyen, but the site at Blindern further west was chosen. According to the encyclopedia Norsk biografisk leksikon, Wille became "bitter" due to this decision.

Wille was also involved in politics, serving as the Conservative Party chairman of the local chapter in Grünerløkken from 1911 to 1913. He subscribed to the idea of philanthropy.

He was a Knight, First Class of the Royal Norwegian Order of St. Olav and a Commander, Second Class of the Swedish Order of the Polar Star. He died in Kristiania in 1924, one year before the name of the city was changed to Oslo.
