= Carl Theodor Schulz =

Norwegian gardener

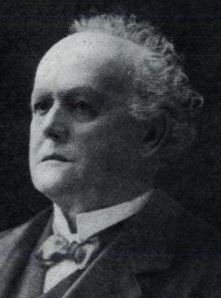
Carl Theodor Schultz

Carl Theodor Schulz (5 April 1835 – 16 August 1914) was a Norwegian gardener.

He was born in Berlin, Germany, the son of Christian Schulz, a tailor. In the 1850s, the young Schulz worked at some market gardens in Berlin and its edge city Potsdam; he was employed at a botanical garden in Hamburg in the subsequent decade. In March 1865, after five years of work in Hamburg, he was hired at the University Botanical Garden in Oslo. He was appointed head gardener in 1893, succeeding the deceased Nils Green. Schulz stayed in that position until his death. In 1895 he released the work Om botaniske haver.

Schulz was a founding member of the Christiania Gardener Association and the Norwegian Horticulture Society; he was the first chairman of the former, and vice-chairman of the latter organisation. From 1892 to 1902, he sat on the board of the Horticulture Society.

The person who recruited Schulz to Norway was Frederik Schübeler. Schulz married an adopted daughter of Schübeler's, Ingeborg Strengberg (1853–1918), in February 1875 in Østre Aker.
