= Frederik Schübeler =

Norwegian botanist (1815–1892)

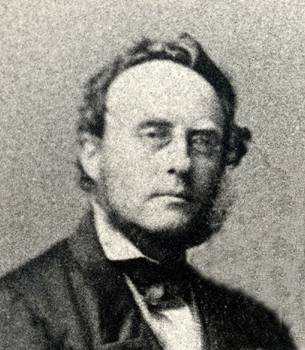
Frederik Christian Schübeler.

Frederik Christian "Fritz" Schübeler (25 September 1815 – 20 June 1892) was a Norwegian botanist.

== Early life ==
He was born in Fredriksstad as the son of Gregers Frederik Schübeler (1790–1856) and Louise Christine Engstrøm (1786–1846).

He graduated from the university with the cand.med. degree in 1840. He had physician jobs at Rikshospitalet from 1841 to 1844 and in Odalen and Lillesand between 1845 and 1847. He then studied botany and horticulture in Europe between 1848 and 1851 with a scholarship from the Royal Norwegian Society of Development. He was a curator at the Botanical Museum in Kristiania from 1852. He applied for the position as head gardener in 1857, but was rejected following resistance from professor Mathias Blytt. After the passing of Blytt, Schübeler was appointed as lecturer in botany in 1864, and professor in 1866. At the same time he became leader of the University Botanical Garden, a position he retained until 1892.

== Work ==
His most important publications were Die Culturpflanzen Norwegens (1862), Die Pflanzenwelt Norwegens (1873–1875) and Viridarium Norvegicum (three volumes released between 1886 and 1889). Popular publications include Havebog for Almuen (1856). He is now regarded as an incomplete theoretician, with several faulty hypotheses, but with important practical contributions. He has therefore been called "the father of horticulture in Norway".

He was a founding member of the Norwegian Horticulture Society in 1884, and became an honorary member already in 1885. He received an honorary degree at the University of Breslau in 1861 and was awarded the Royal Norwegian Society of Development's gold medal in 1865.

== Personal life ==
He was married twice. An adopted daughter of his, Ingeborg Strengberg (1853–1918), married botanical gardener Carl Theodor Schulz.
