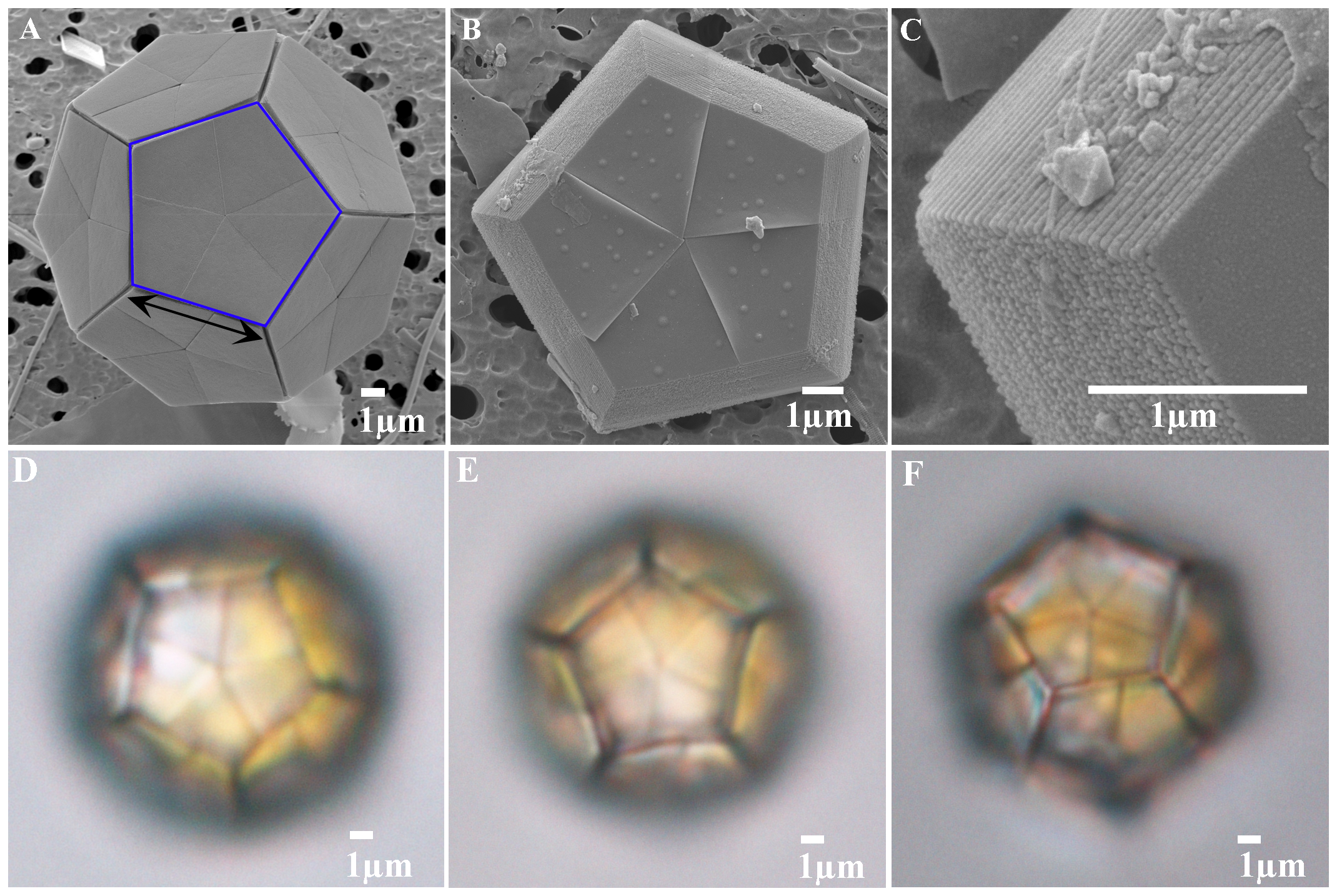
- Braarudosphaera bigelowii

Scientific classification
- Domain: Eukaryota
- Division: Haptophyta
- Class: Prymnesiophyceae
- Order: Braarudosphaerales
- Family: Braarudosphaeraceae (Gran & Braarud) Deflandre

Type genus
- Braarudosphaera (Gran & Braarud) Deflandre

= Braarudosphaeraceae =

Family of algae

Braarudosphaeraceae is a family of coccolithophores.

It contains a variety of genera, including but not limited to Braarudosphaera, †Micrantholithus, †Hexadelus, †Pemma, †Pentaster, and †Trapezopentus. However, the vast majority of these genera have gone extinct.
