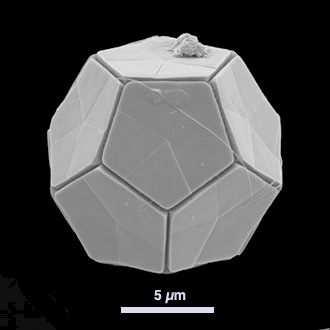

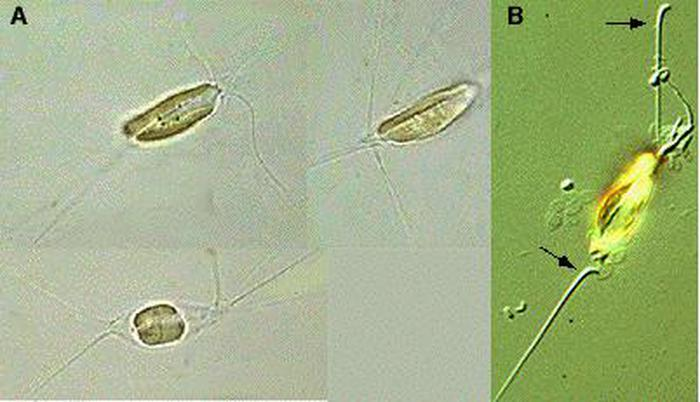

Scientific classification
- Domain: Eukaryota
- Division: Haptophyta
- Class: Prymnesiophyceae
- Order: Braarudosphaerales
- Family: Braarudosphaeraceae
- Genus: Braarudosphaera
- Species: B. bigelowii

Binomial name
- Braarudosphaera bigelowii (Gran & Braarud) Deflandre

= Braarudosphaera bigelowii =

Braarudosphaera bigelowii Temporal range: Late Cretaceous–present

Dodecahedron shaped coccolithophore

Braarudosphaera bigelowii is a coastal coccolithophore in the fossil record going back 100 million years to the Late Cretaceous. Due to endosymbiontic integration, it has obtained a nitrogen-fixing organelle called a nitroplast.

== Coccolithophore ==
The family Braarudosphaeraceae consists of single-celled coastal phytoplanktonic algae whose diploid phase is covered with calcareous scales with five-fold symmetry, called pentaliths. With 12 sides, it has a regular dodecahedral structure, approximately 10 micrometers across.

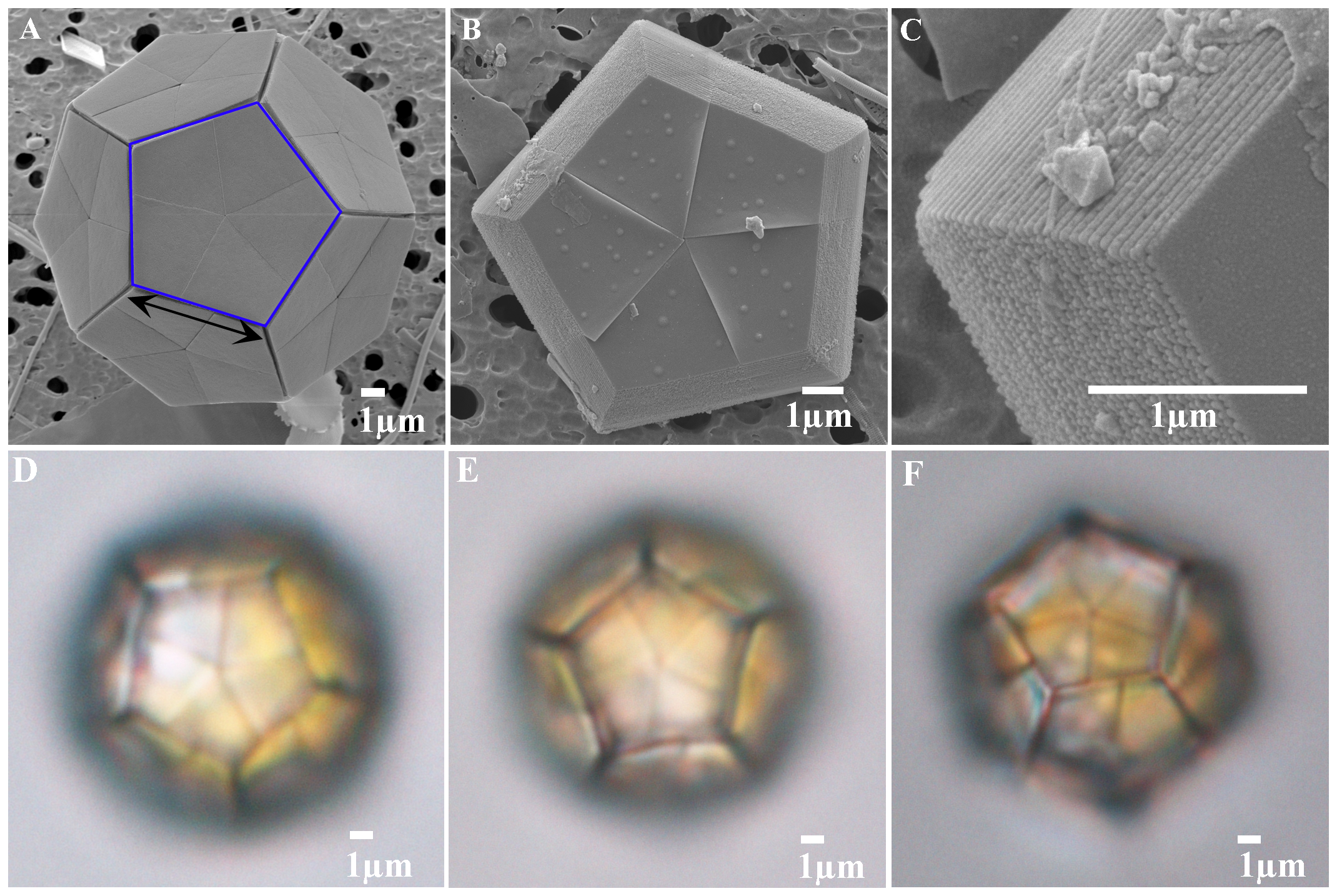
(A) SEM image of a cell of B. bigelowii surrounded by 12 pentaliths. A pentalith (calcareous scale of the Braarudosphaeraceae) indicated by the blue open pentagon consists of five trapezoidal segments. Black arrow indicates "side length of the pentalith" where the measurements were conducted. (B) SEM image of pentalith of B. bigelowii (proximal side). (C) Close up of proximal side in previous image showing laminar structure. (D) – (F) light microscope images of three different specimens.

== Nitroplast and endosymbiosis ==
A nitroplast inside B. bigelowii (haploid phase without coccoliths), marked by a black arrow. Like other haptophytes, the cell has 2 unequal flagella.

Braarudosphaera bigelowii has 2 organelles originated from cyanobacterial endosymbiosis. One is its chloroplast, which originated from secondary endosymbiosis, in which another eukaryote with a chloroplast was incorporated into its ancestor. The other is its nitroplast, which comes from a second primary endosymbiosis event (like the chromatophore of Paulinella). The ancestor of the nitroplast was different from that of the chloroplast. Both of them were able to photosynthesize. However, the nitroplast lost its ability to photosynthesize during its development into an organelle.

The nitroplast originated some 100 million years ago from a cyanobacterial endosymbiont called UCYN-A2, which allows B. bigelowii to fix nitrogen and convert it into compounds useful for cell growth. This endosymbiosis event occurred much later than that of the chloroplasts of the Archaeplastida, so many genes are still preserved in the nitroplast genome.

The number of chloroplasts and nitroplasts is fixed, so their division should synchronize with cell division to ensure that its offspring have the correct number. B. bigelowii has two chloroplasts (secondary endosymbiosis) and one nitroplast, the order of replication of them is: mitochondria, nitroplast, nucleus, then chloroplasts.

This phenomenon is previously known from diatoms in the family Rhopalodiaceae, where a nitrogen fixing and non-photosynthetic cyanobacterial endosymbiont, a diazoplast, provides the photosynthetic host cell with nitrogen.

== Name ==
The genus name Braarudosphaera is in honour of Norwegian botanist Trygve Braarud (1903–1985). He specialized in marine biology, and was affiliated with the University of Oslo.

== Metabolism, cell structure, and life cycle ==
The nitroplast have reduced their ancestral genes for photosynthesis, so it needs products from chloroplasts to support them. Such dependence on chloroplasts of nitroplast explain why the N_{2} fixation should undergo in daytime.

However, the coordination of photosynthesis and nitrogen fixing might cause some problems. The O_{2} from photosynthesis might inhibit the activity of nitrogenase, the enzyme for N_{2} fixing.

The N_{2} fixation is an energy-consuming process. This might be why the nitroplast is surrounded by mitochondria. The analogous structure is also observed in other cells that need tremendous energy, like vertebrate neurons.

Scientists infer that the cell division might also be related to the high energy demand. As observation, the cell division only happens in night time, when the photosynthesis and nitrogen fixing pause. As experiments, the LAC data (Linear Absorption Coefficient, index of molecular density) is low in mitochondria and nitroplasts at the time of their fission, which mean low providing of energy, and so the efficiency of N_{2} fixing. So the cell division and N_{2} fixing should stagger.
