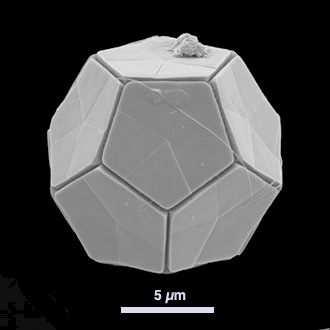
- Braarudosphaera bigelowii

Scientific classification
- Domain: Eukaryota
- Division: Haptophyta
- Class: Prymnesiophyceae
- Order: Braarudosphaerales (Gran & Braarud) Deflandre

= Braarudosphaerales =

Order of algae

Braarudosphaerales is an order of coccolithophores.

Within it is a handful of families, each with their own general habit of producing coccoliths. These families include (but are not limited to) Braarudosphaeraceae, †Nannoconaceae, and †Polycyclolithaceae.

However, two genera belonging to this order have been assigned incertae sedis, those being †Kokia and †Tegulalithus. Two more genera are also classified as “transitional” between Braarudosphaeraceae and Nannoconaceae, and those are †Hexalithus and †Polycostella.
