= Grethe Rytter Hasle =

Norwegian scientist and planktologist

- Born: 3 January 1920; Horten
- Died: 9 November 2013 (aged 93)
- Citizenship: Norwegian
- Education: University of Oslo
- Scientific career
- Fields: planktology
- Workplaces: University of Oslo lecturer 1961–1977 professor 1977–1990
- Academic advisors: Trygve Braarud
- Author abbrev. (botany): Hasle

Grethe Berit Rytter Hasle (3 January 1920 – 9 November 2013) was a Norwegian planktologist. Among the first female professors of natural science at the University of Oslo, she specialized in the study of phytoplankton.

== Personal life ==
Hasle was born in Borre as the daughter of shipmaster Johan Kristian Rytter (1890–1966) and his wife Nicoline Olava Nielsen (1885–1976). She married Hans Martin Hasle and took his name; he died in 1971. She resided at Ekeberg in Norway and died in November 2013.

== Career ==
She graduated from Elverum Teachers' College in 1942, and graduated from the University of Oslo in 1949 where she worked with Trygve Braarud. In 1950, she published her first paper: Phototactic vertical migration in marine dinoflagellates. She took the dr.philos. degree in 1968 on the thesis An Analysis of the Phytoplankton of the Pacific Southern Ocean.

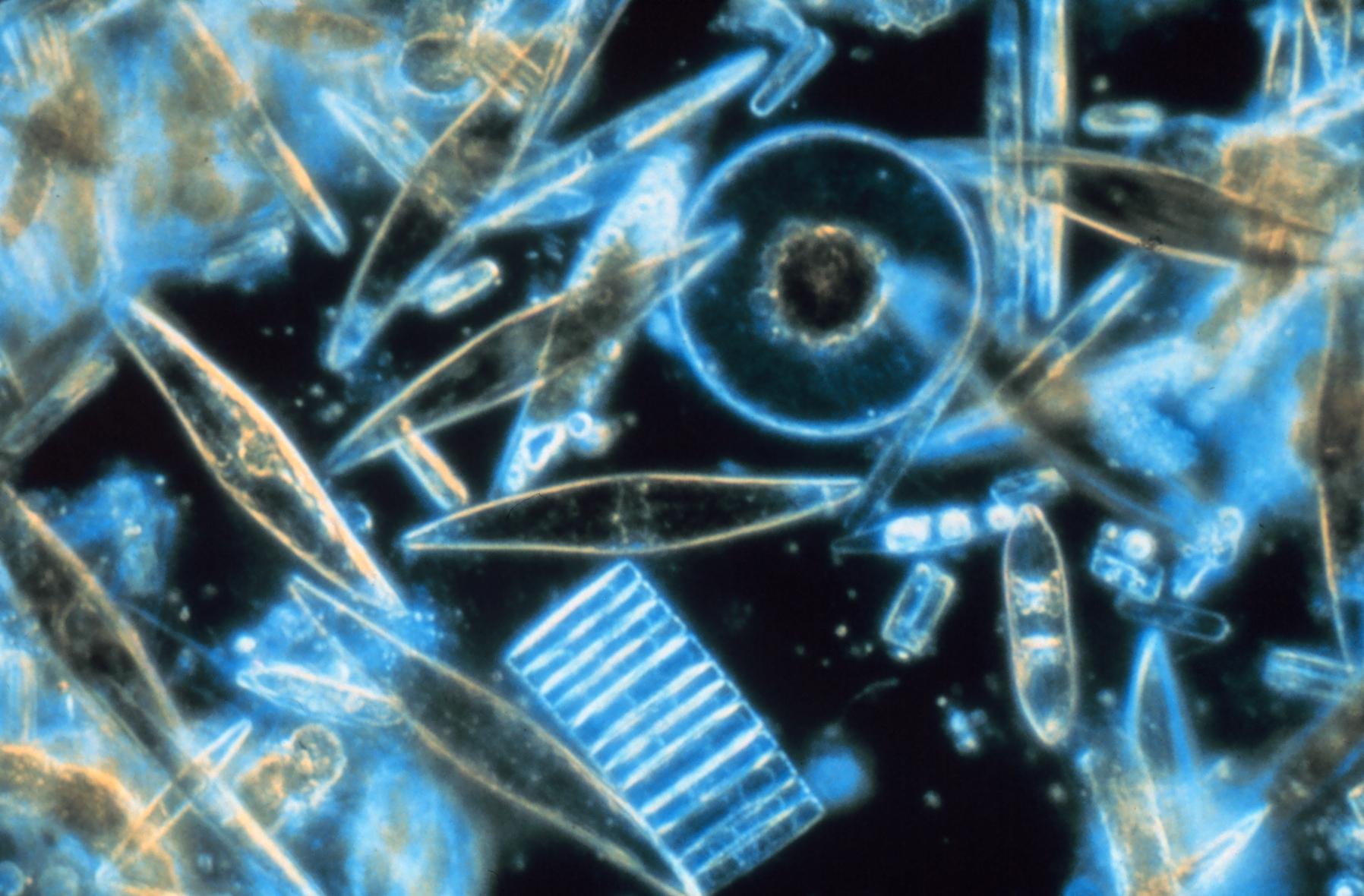
Bacillariophyceae.

She was hired as a lecturer at the University of Oslo in 1961, and was then a professor of marine botany from 1977 to 1990. She was the third female professor at the Faculty of Mathematics and Natural Sciences, and was inducted into the Norwegian Academy of Science and Letters in 1980 as the only female researcher at the time representing the natural sciences. She was also a visiting scholar at the Texas A&M University from 1968 to 1969. She is especially known for her studies of phytoplankton in general, and specifically the class Bacillariophyceae. The Bacillariophyceae genus Haslea has been named after her. She is also known for revising the morphological taxonomy of the genera Thalassiosira, Nitzschia and Fragilariopsis.

She was honored with a Festschrift for her seventieth birthday, and she received the Award of Excellence from the Phycological Society of America in 2000 and the Yasumoto Lifetime Achievement Award from the International Society for the Study of Harmful Algae in 2003.

== Selected publications ==
- Hasle, Grethe R.; Fryxell, Greta A. (1970). "Diatoms: Cleaning and Mounting for Light and Electron Microscopy". Transactions of the American Microscopical Society. 89 (4): 469. doi:10.2307/3224555. JSTOR 3224555.
- Rytter Hasle, Grethe (1976-04-01). "The biogeography of some marine planktonic diatoms". Deep Sea Research and Oceanographic Abstracts. 23 (4): 319–IN6. Bibcode:1976DSRA...23..319R. doi:10.1016/0011-7471(76)90873-1. ISSN 0011-7471.
- Hasle, G. R.; Lange, C. B.; Syvertsen, E. E. (1996). "A review ofPseudo-nitzschia, with special reference to the Skagerrak, North Atlantic, and adjacent waters". Helgoländer Meeresuntersuchungen. 50 (2): 131–175. Bibcode:1996HM.....50..131H. doi:10.1007/BF02367149. ISSN 0174-3597. S2CID 23937921.
- Fryxell, Greta A.; Hasle, Grethe R. (1972). "Thalassiosira Eccentrica (Ehrenb.) Cleve, T. Symmetricasp. Nov., and Some Related Centric Diatoms1". Journal of Phycology. 8 (4): 297–317. doi:10.1111/j.1529-8817.1972.tb04044.x. S2CID 86683111.
- Lundholm, Nina; Hasle, Grethe Rytter; Fryxell, Greta A.; Hargraves, Paul E. (2002). "Morphology, phylogeny and taxonomy of species within the Pseudo-nitzschia americana complex (Bacillariophyceae) with descriptions of two new species, Pseudo-nitzschia brasiliana and Pseudo-nitzschia linea". Phycologia. 41 (5): 480–497. Bibcode:2002Phyco..41..480L. doi:10.2216/i0031-8884-41-5-480.1. ISSN 0031-8884. S2CID 85308820.
