= Natural History Museum at the University of Oslo =

Natural history museum in Oslo, Norway

Coordinates: 59.9198°N 10.7717°E

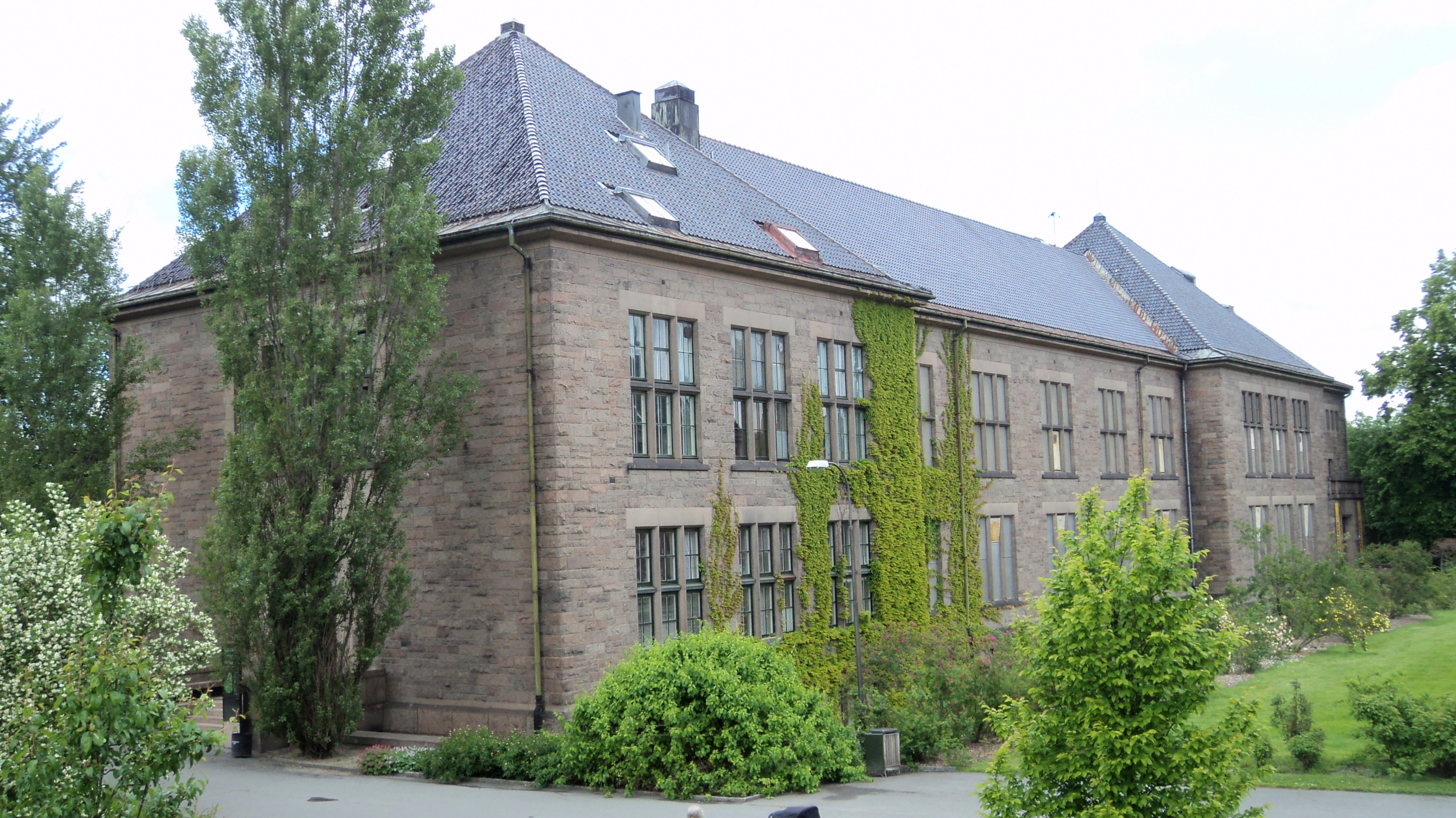
Zoological Museum Oslo

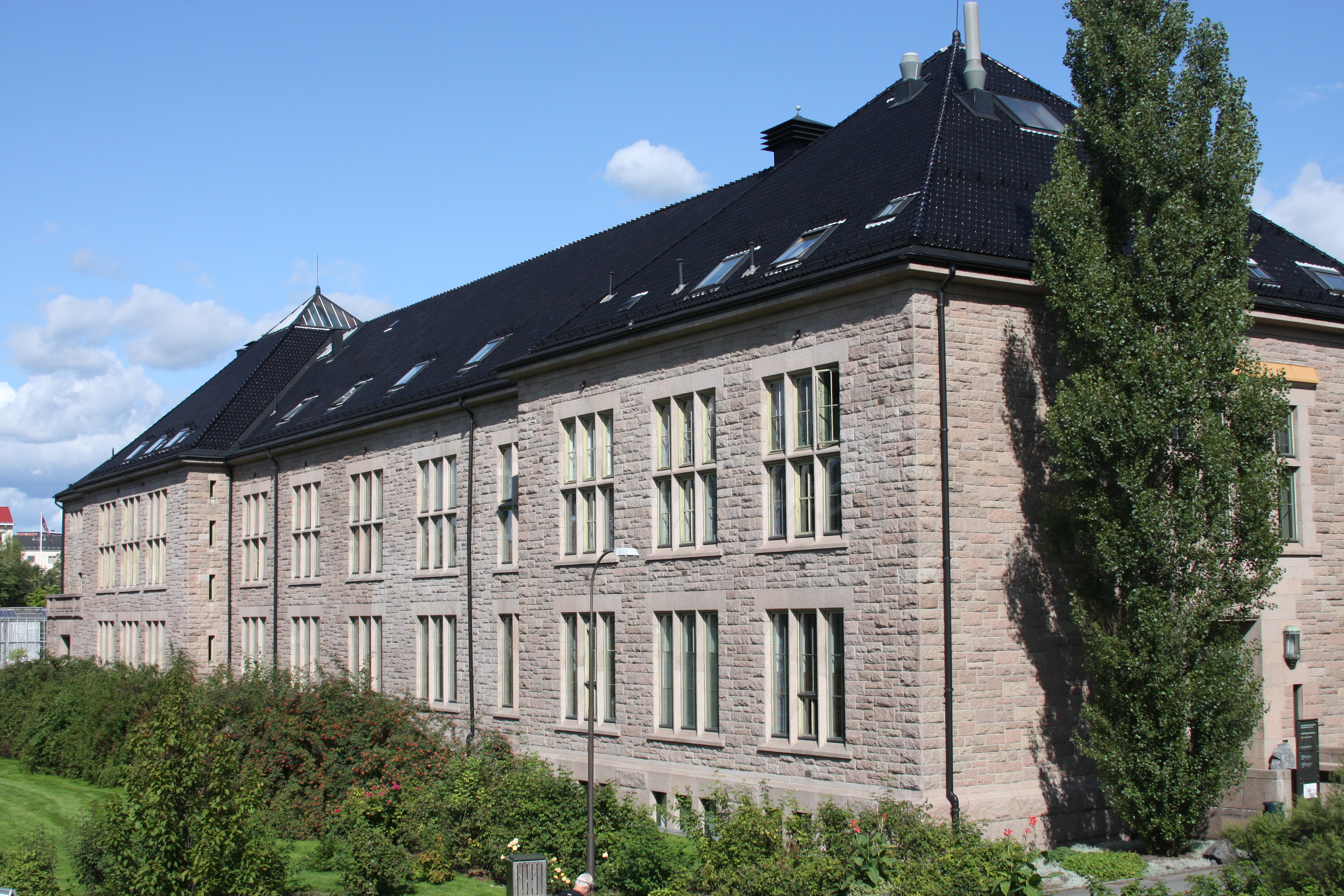
Geological Museum Oslo

The Natural History Museum at the University of Oslo (Norwegian: Naturhistorisk museum, NHM) is Norway's oldest and largest museum of natural history. It is situated in the neighborhood of Tøyen in Oslo, Norway.

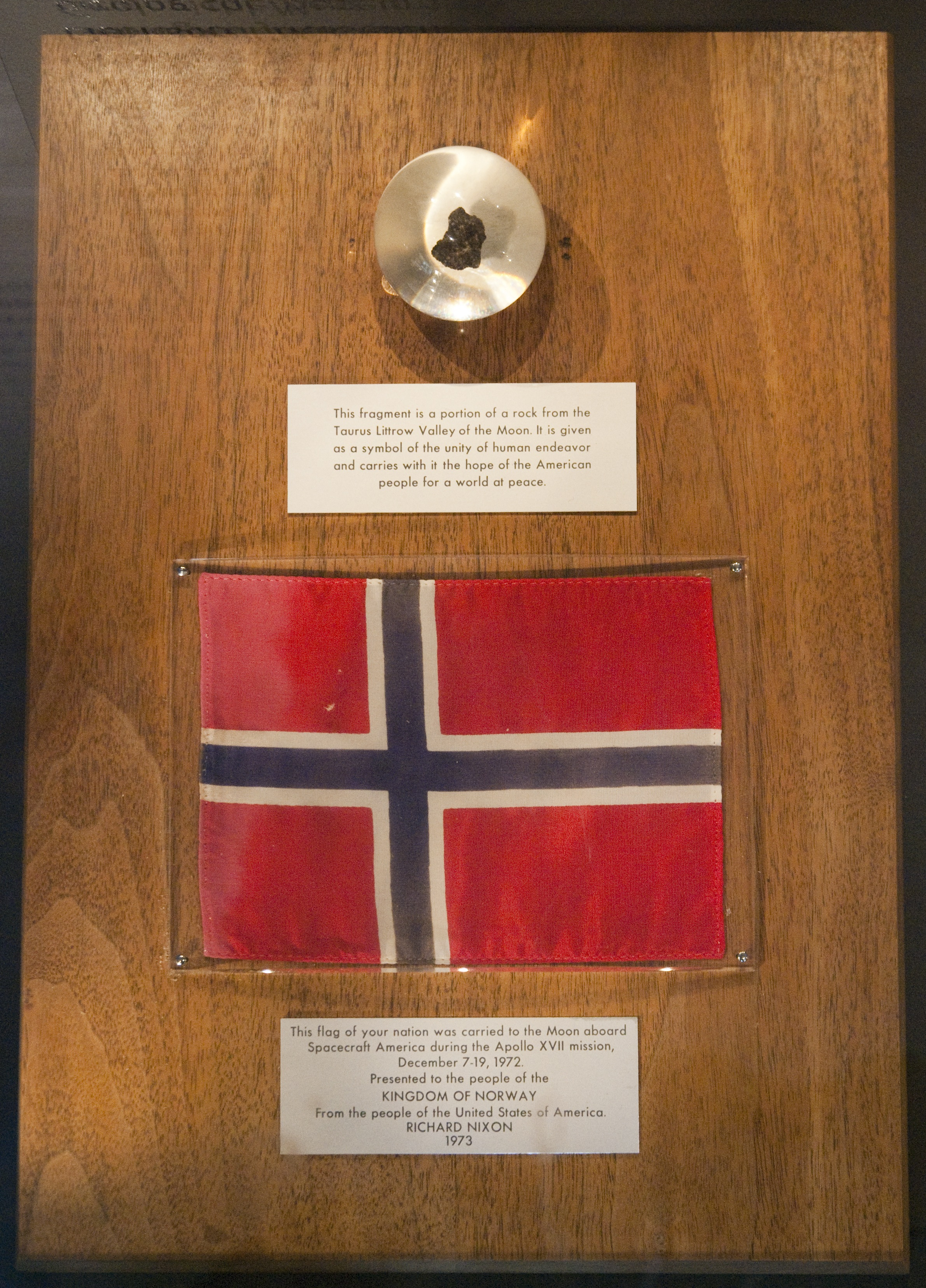
Detail of the Apollo 17 exhibit from the Geological museum, showing a Moon rock and a space flown Norwegian flag.

It traces its roots to the University Botanical Garden, which was founded near Tøyen Manor in 1814. Museums for zoology, botany and geology were added approximately a hundred years later, when the university campus in central Oslo had become too small for such purposes. Major proponents were Waldemar Christofer Brøgger and Nordal Wille. For most of the twentieth century the museums and botanical garden were organized in five different entities; these were merged on 1 August 1999. The current name dates from 2005.

The Zoological Museum displaying wildlife from Norway as well as the rest of the world. The Botanical Garden contains 35,000 plants, 7,500 species and two exhibition greenhouses. The Geological Museum contain research material of more than 2 million fossils, rock specimens and minerals. A selection of specimens are on display in both the Geological Museum and the Zoological Museum. Among the attractions is the Darwinius masillae fossil "Ida", a primate from the Eocene Epoch.

== Collections ==
The museum's herbarium and fungarium are among the largest natural history collections in Norway. In a 2023 overview, the Natural History Museum reported that its botanical and mycological collections together held more than 1.7 million specimens, including about 1.1 million plants, 270,000 lichens and 330,000 fungi. Much of this material has been digitized and made searchable through the museum's own collections portal and through the Global Biodiversity Information Facility.

The Arctic has long been a major area of collecting and research for the museum. A 2023 survey of the collections recorded more than 233,000 Arctic plant, lichen and fungal specimens, with the oldest dating back more than 200 years. The holdings are circumpolar in scope, but are especially strong for northern mainland Norway and Svalbard. They also preserve material from major polar expeditions, including the second Fram expedition, the Gjøa expedition and the Maud expedition, as well as later twentieth-century collecting campaigns.

The museum also holds a large body of nomenclatural type material from Arctic regions and maintains a DNA bank for botanical and mycological research. According to the same survey, the Arctic collections included 984 identified type collections, while the DNA bank held 22,879 Arctic accessions of plants, lichens and fungi. These collections support taxonomic, biogeographical and conservation research, and have become increasingly useful as historical records of Arctic biodiversity during a period of rapid environmental change.

== Gallery ==
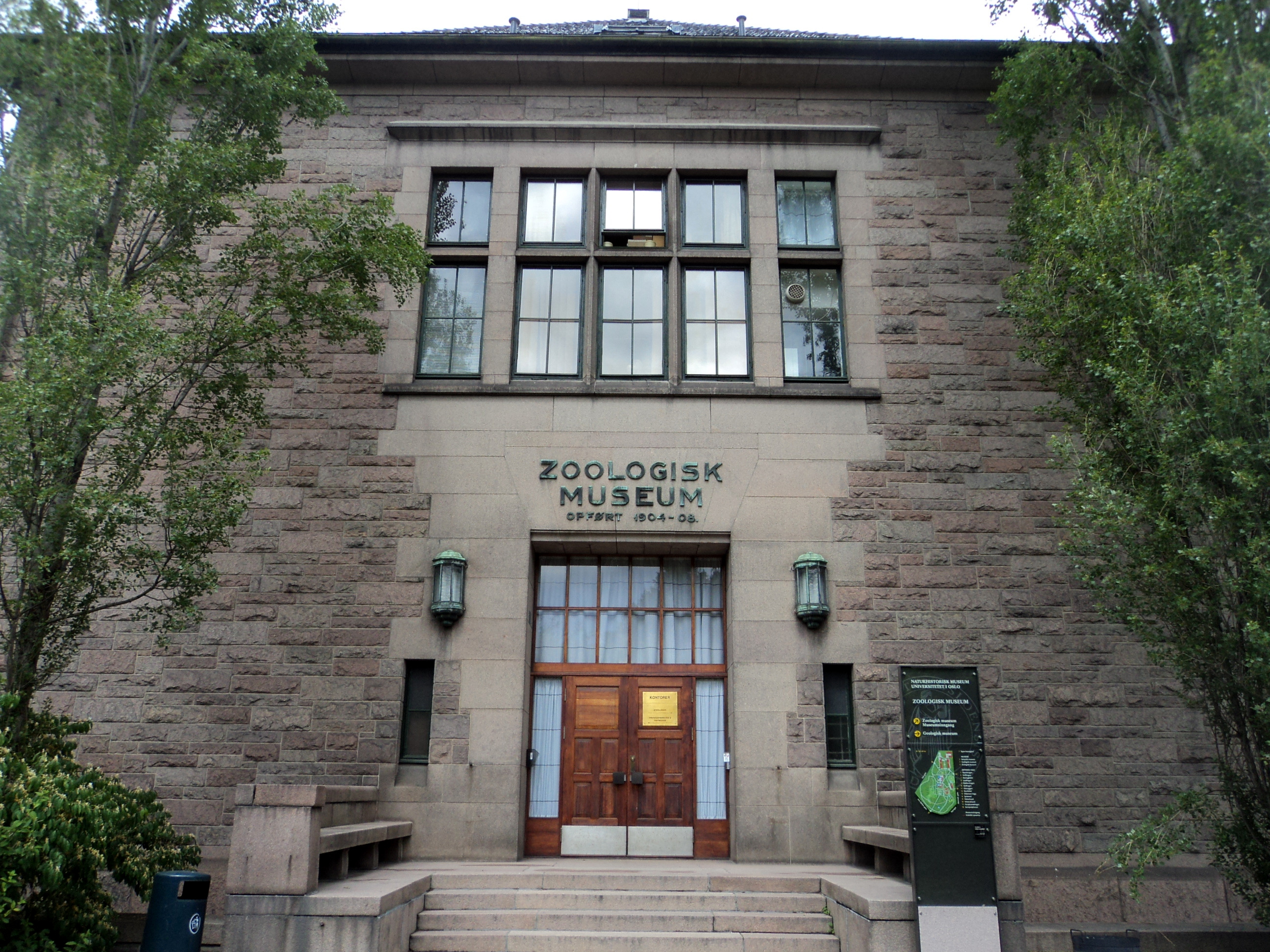
Office entrance to Zoological Museum

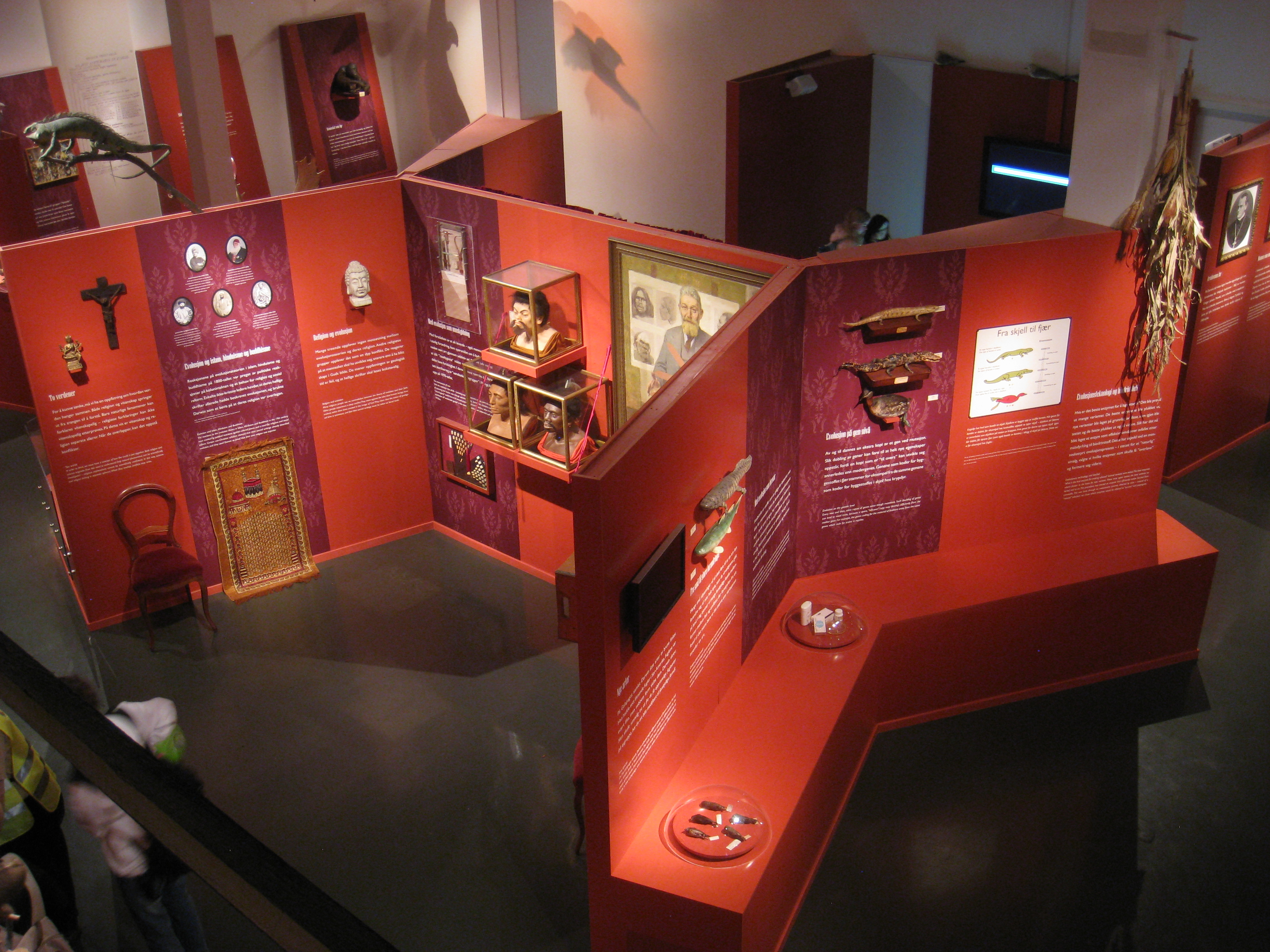
Display at Zoological Museum

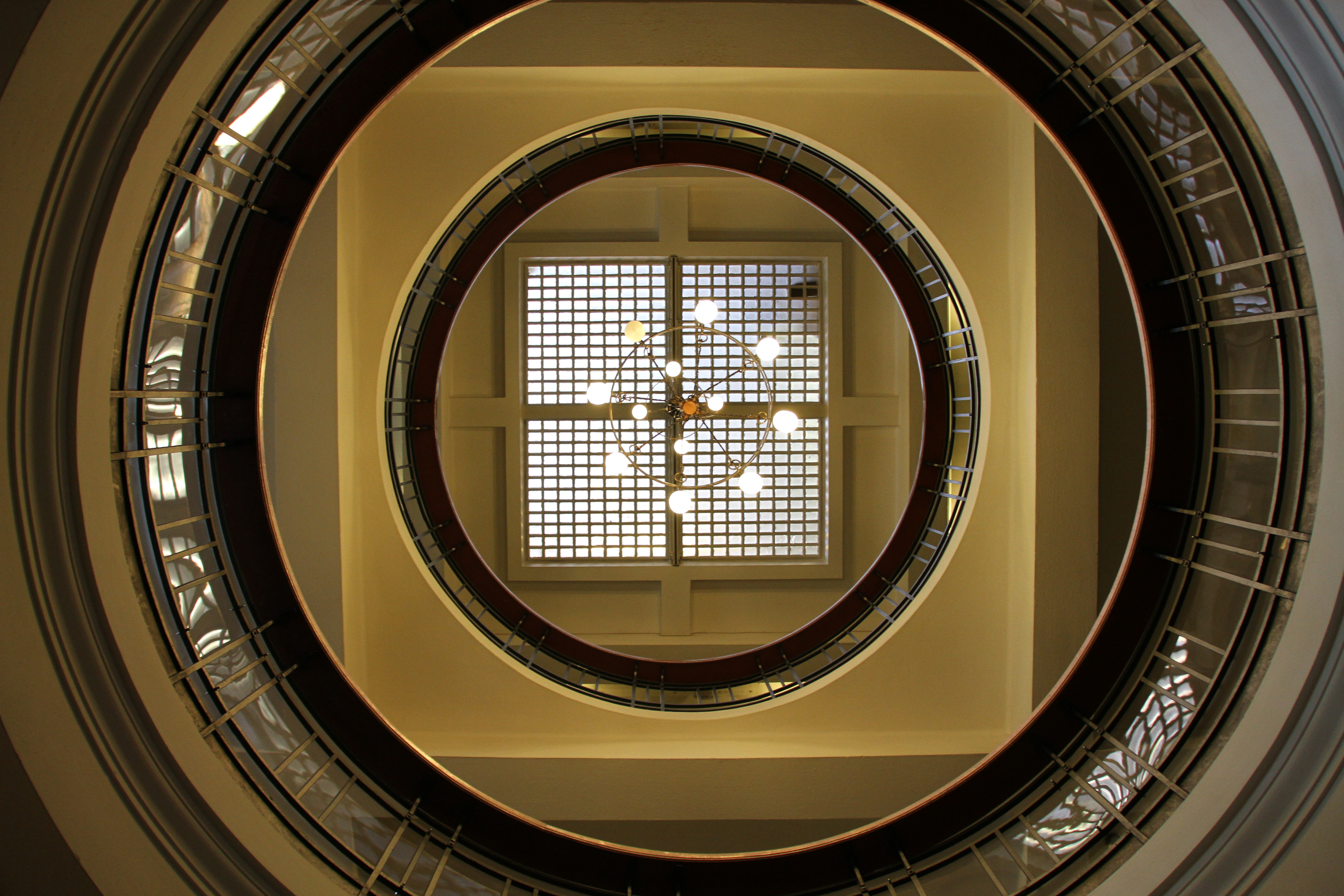
Ceiling at the Geological Museum, Oslo.

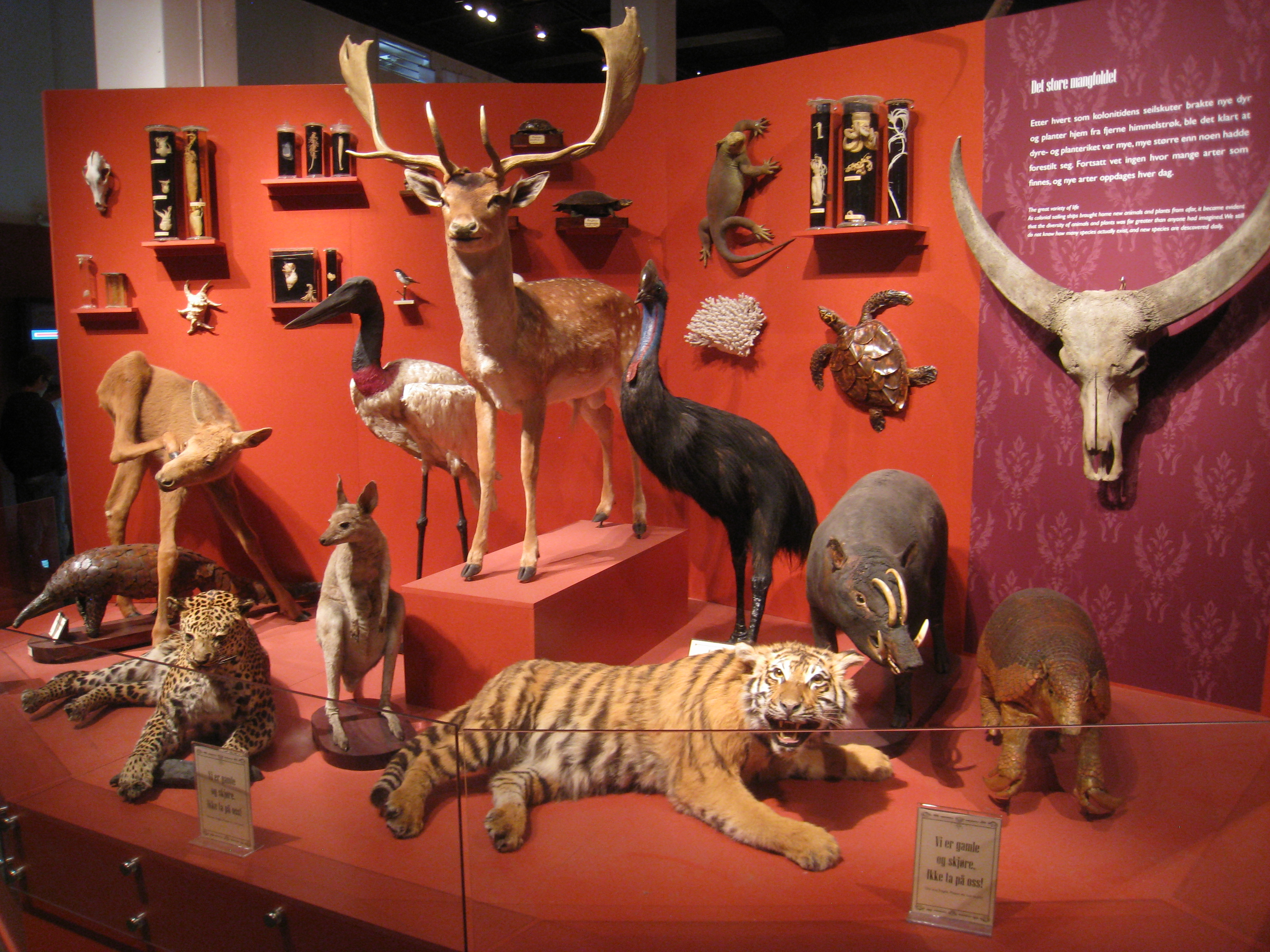
Display at Zoology Museum

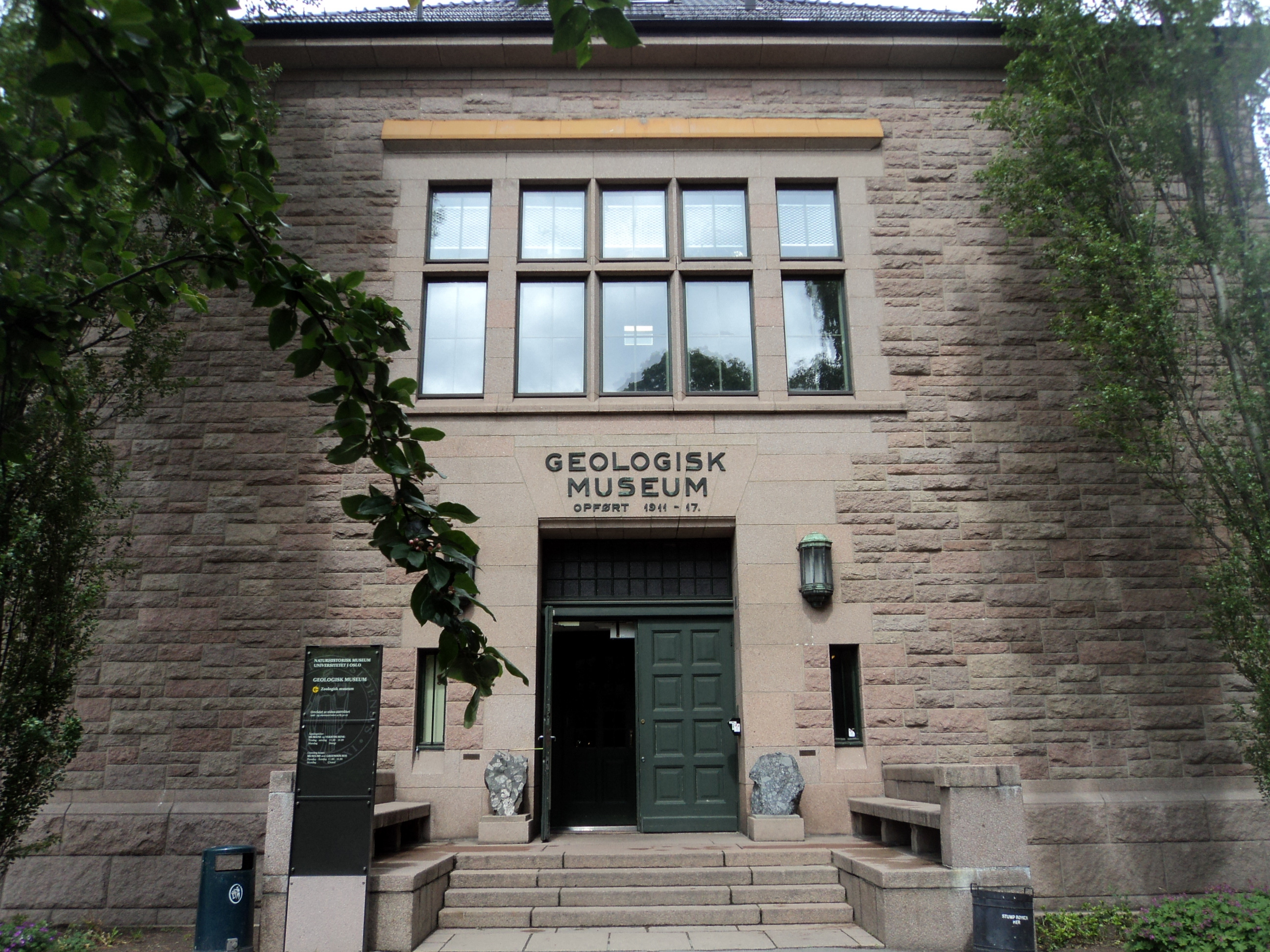
Entrance to Geological Museum
