= Greta Fryxell =

American oceanographer

- Born: Greta Albrecht; November 21, 1926; Princeton, New Jersey
- Died: September 24, 2017 (aged 90); Claremont, California
- Education: Texas A&M University
- Scientific career
- Thesis: Morphology, taxonomy, and distribution of selected diatom species of Thalassiosira Cleve in the Gulf of Mexico and Antarctic waters (1975)
- Doctoral advisor: Sayed El-Sayed

Greta Albrecht Fryxell (November 21, 1926 – September 24, 2017) was a marine scientist known for her work on the biology and taxonomy of diatoms. In 1996, she was elected a fellow of the American Association for the Advancement of Science.

== Education and career ==
Fryxell graduated summa cum laude from Augustana College in 1948 and then taught in junior high schools in Iowa. She was one of the first women admitted to Texas A&M University where she first earned a masters in education in 1969. In 1975, she earned her Ph.D. from Texas A&M University working on the taxonomy of select diatoms. Fryxell worked at Texas A&M University and the University of Texas at Austin.

== Research ==
Fryxell is known for her research on phytoplankton, especially diatoms, where she combined investigations of laboratory cultures with samples collected from a variety of locations including the North Atlantic, Gulf of Mexico, and Antarctica. She established a framework for phytoplankton taxonomy and, on her 70th birthday, the Fryxelliella genus of diatoms was named after her to acknowledge her work on diatom taxonomy and biology.

In 1970, Fryxell worked with Grethe Rytter Hasle to describe a means to prepare diatom samples for microscopy. They would go on to jointly publish many species descriptions As a part of her graduate work with Sayed El-Sayed, Fryxell described the diatoms in a sample collected by the Shackelton expedition on 20 August 1908; the sample was collected from 50 to 80 fathoms near Cape Royds, Ross Island. She has described chain-forming diatoms and the evolution of diatoms. In the North Atlantic Ocean, she examined diatoms in Gulf Stream warm core rings and how the warm core rings alter the distribution of diatoms. In Antarctica, she examined phytoplankton found in Antarctic pack ice. Fryxell's research includes investigations into multiple species of Pseudo-nitzschia, and their role in toxin production in the Gulf of Mexico and the west coast of the United States. She has also worked on diatoms that produce domoic acid.

== Selected publications ==
- Hasle, Grethe R.; Fryxell, Greta A. (1970). "Diatoms: Cleaning and Mounting for Light and Electron Microscopy". Transactions of the American Microscopical Society. 89 (4): 469. doi:10.2307/3224555. JSTOR 3224555.
- Fryxell, Greta A.; Kendrick, Gary A. (1988). "Austral spring microalgae across the Weddell Sea ice edge: spatial relationships found along a northward transect during AMERIEZ 83". Deep Sea Research Part A. Oceanographic Research Papers. 35 (1): 1–20. Bibcode:1988DSRA...35....1F. doi:10.1016/0198-0149(88)90054-4.
- Fryxell, Greta A.; Hasle, Grethe R. (1972). "Thalassiosira Eccentrica(Ehrenb.) Cleve, T. Symmetricasp. Nov., and Some Related Centric Diatoms1". Journal of Phycology. 8 (4): 297–317. Bibcode:1972JPcgy...8..297F. doi:10.1111/j.1529-8817.1972.tb04044.x. S2CID 86683111.
- Fryxell, Greta A.; Villac, M. Célia; Shapiro, Lynda P. (1997). "The occurrence of the toxic diatom genus Pseudo-nitzschia (Bacillariophyceae) on the West Coast of the USA, 1920–1996: a review". Phycologia. 36 (6): 419–437. Bibcode:1997Phyco..36..419F. doi:10.2216/i0031-8884-36-6-419.1. ISSN 0031-8884.
- Survival strategies of the algae. Greta A. Fryxell. Cambridge: Cambridge University Press. 2010. ISBN 978-0-521-18008-5. OCLC 649801905.

== Awards and honors ==
In 1997, the Genus Fryxelliella was named in honor of Fryxell's work on diatoms. Other phytoplankton named after Fryxell include Actinocyclus fryxelliae Barron, Poloniasira fryxelliana I. Kaczmarska & J.M. Ehrman, and Thalassiosira fryxelliae. In 1988, she received the Provasoli Award of the Phycological Society of America for a paper she co-authored with A. Michelle Wood and Russell Lande. In 1996, she received the Phycological Society of America's Award of Excellence. She also received a Distinguished Achievement Award in Research from Texas A&M's Former Students' Association (1991) and was elected a fellow of the American Association for the Advancement of Science in 1996. In 2008, there was a festschrift in her honor.

== Personal life ==
She married the botanist Paul Fryxell in 1947. Three of her children contributed to the 2008 festschrift in her honor: Karl J Fryxell, Joan E. Fryxell, and Glen E. Fryxell.
