= Johan Siebke =

Norwegian botanical gardener (1781–1857)

Johan Siebke (17 June 1781 – 14 August 1857) was a Norwegian botanical gardener.

Siebke grew up in Schleswig-Holstein. He was a student and apprentice gardener at the University of Copenhagen Botanical Garden. For the first four decades on it operation, he served as the botanical gardener of the University of Oslo Botanical Garden in the neighborhood of Tøyen in Oslo, Norway. His son Johan Heinrich Spalckhawer Siebke was a pioneer Norwegian entomologist.
