= Biological oceanography =

Study of organisms in oceanographic systems

Biological oceanography is the study of how organisms affect and are affected by the physics, chemistry, and geology of the oceanographic system. Biological oceanography may also be referred to as ocean ecology, in which the root word of ecology is Oikos (oικoσ), meaning ‘house’ or ‘habitat’ in Greek. The main focus of biological oceanography is on the microorganisms within the ocean; looking at how they are affected by their environment and how that affects larger marine creatures and their ecosystem. Biological oceanography is similar to marine biology, but is different because of the perspective used to study the ocean. Biological oceanography takes a bottom-up approach (in terms of the food web), while marine biology studies the ocean from a top-down perspective. Biological oceanography mainly focuses on the ecosystem of the ocean with an emphasis on plankton: their diversity (morphology, nutritional sources, motility, and metabolism); their productivity and how that plays a role in the global carbon cycle; and their distribution (predation and life cycle).

== History ==
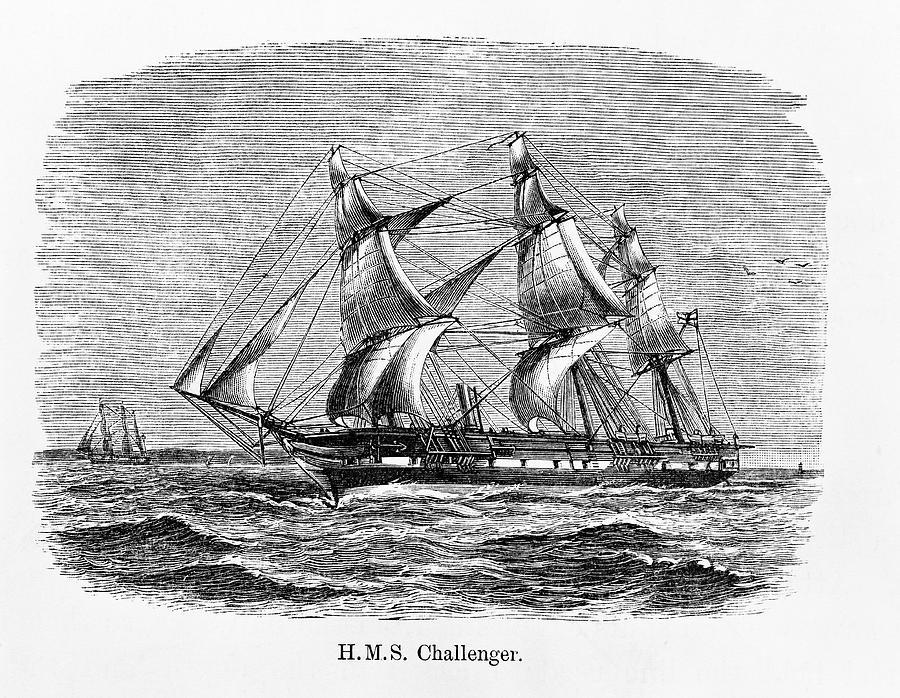
HMS Challenger during its pioneer expedition of 1872–76

In 325 BC, Pytheas of Massalia, a Greek geographer, explored much of the coast of England and Norway and developed the means of determining latitude from the declination of the North Star. His account of tides is also one of the earliest accounts that suggest a relationship between them and the moon. This relationship was later developed by English monk Bede in De Temporum Ratione (The Reckoning of Time) around 700 AD.

Understanding the ocean began with the general exploration and voyaging for trade. Some notable events closer to our time, include Prince Henry the Navigator’s ocean exploration in the 1400s. In 1513, Ponce de Leon described the Florida Current. In 1674, Robert Boyle investigated the relationship between salinity, temperature, and pressure in the depths of the ocean. Captain James Cook’s voyages were responsible for the extensive data collection on geography, geology, biota, currents, tides, and water temperatures of the Atlantic and Pacific oceans in the 1760s and 1770s. In 1820, Alexander Marcet noted the varying chemical composition of seawater in the different oceans. Not long after, in 1843, Edward Forbes, a British naturalist, stated that marine organisms could not exist deeper than 300 fathoms (even though many had already collected organisms much deeper, many followed Forbes' influence). Forbes’ theory was finally believed to be incorrect by the masses when submarine cable was lifted from a depth of 1830 m and covered in animals. This finding began the plans for the Challenger Expedition.

The Challenger Expedition was pivotal to biological oceanography and oceanography in general. The Challenger Expedition was headed by Charles Wyville Thomson in 1872–1876. The expedition also included two other naturalists, Henry N. Moseley and John Murray. Before the expedition, the ocean was, although interesting to many, considered an unpredictable and mostly life-less body of water, and this expedition made them rethink this stance on the ocean This expedition was at the behest of The Royal Society to see if they would be able to lay cables at the bottom of the ocean. They also brought the equipment to collect data about the biological, chemical, and geological properties of the ocean in a systematic way. They mapped the oceanic sediment and collected data The data collected in this voyage proved that there was life in deep waters (5500 meters) and that the composition of water in the ocean is consistent. The success of the Challenger Expedition led to many more expeditions by the Germans, French, US, and other British explorers.

== Motivation ==
Oceans occupy about 71% of the Earth's surface. Whilst the average depth of the oceans is about 3800 m, the deepest parts are almost 11000 m. The marine environment has a total volume (approximately 1.37 billion km^{3}) that is 300 times larger for life than the volume of land and freshwater combined. It is thought that the earliest organisms originated in the ancient oceans, long before any forms of life appeared on land. Ocean biology is dominated by organisms that are fundamentally different from organisms on land and the time scales of the ocean are much different than the atmosphere (whilst the atmosphere exchanges globally every 3 weeks, the ocean can take 1000 years). For these reasons we cannot make assumptions about ocean life based on what we know from land and atmospheric models. The range of diversity of life in the ocean is one of the main motivations behind the continued study of biological oceanography. Such a range in diversity means there is a need for a range of equipment and tools used to study diversity. With the ocean organisms being much more inaccessible and not easily observable (relative to terrestrial organisms), there is a slower growth of knowledge and a consistent need for further exploration and study.

The second main motivation behind the continued study of biological oceanography is climate change. Biological oceanography ties closely with physical and chemical oceanography and the details we learn from biological oceanography tell us information about the bigger picture and help us build models of larger-scale processes. Such models are even more critical when the global environment is changing at an unprecedented rate. There are global patterns in environmental conditions, such as changes in pH, temperature, salinity, and CO_{2}, but not everywhere sees the same change. The ocean makes the earth habitable through regulation of the Earth's climate and processes such as primary production which provide oxygen as a byproduct. Biology is central to facilitating some of these processes but with climate change and human impacts, the ocean environment is constantly changing and so calls for consistent and continued research.

Some of the main questions that biological oceanographers seek to answer may include: what sorts of organisms inhabit different sectors and depths of the ocean and why? A lot of biological oceanographic research studies the production of organic matter by ocean life and examines what factors affect their growth, and as a result the production rates of organic matter. Some biological oceanographers look at the relationships between organisms themselves, all the way from microbes to whales, and some look at the relationships between certain organisms and the chemical or physical characteristics of the ocean. Biological oceanographers also seek to answer questions with a more direct and immediate impact on humans- such as asking what we can expect to harvest from the sea, and answering how the weather, seasons, or recent natural disasters may affect the fisheries’ harvest. Some of the main questions at the moment and for the future is looking at how climate change will affect the ocean biota.

== See also ==
- Marine life – Organisms that live in salt water
- Marine microorganism – Any life form too small for the naked human eye to see that lives in a marine environment
- Oceanography – Scientific study of the ocean
- Phytoplankton – Autotrophic members of the plankton ecosystem
- Zooplankton – Heterotrophic protistan or metazoan members of the plankton ecosystem
- Physical Oceanography – Study of physical conditions and processes within the ocean
- Chemical Oceanography – Chemistry of oceans and seas
- Climate Change – Human-caused changes to climate on Earth
- Marine plastic pollution – Environmental pollution by plastics
- Planktology – Study of plankton
