= Vivienne Cassie Cooper =

New Zealand planktologist and botanist

Vivienne Cassie Cooper MNZM
- Born: Una Vivienne Dellow; 29 September 1926; Auckland, New Zealand
- Died: 5 July 2021 (aged 94)
- Education: Victoria University College
- Spouses: Richard Morrison Cassie (m. 1953; died 1974) Robert Cecil Cooper (m. 1984; died 2004)
- Children: 2
- Scientific career
- Fields: Planktology; aquatic botany
- Workplaces: DSIR
- Thesis: Marine algal ecology of the Hauraki Gulf, New Zealand (1954)
- Author abbrev. (botany): Cassie

Una Vivienne Cassie Cooper MNZM (née Dellow; 29 September 1926 – 5 July 2021) was a New Zealand planktologist and botanist.

== Early life ==
Cassie Cooper was born on 29 September 1926 in the Auckland suburb of Epsom to Annie Eveline Bell and her husband, Kenneth Dellow. She was educated at Takapuna Grammar School, where her father was headmaster from 1935. She received her Bachelor of Arts and Master of Arts degrees from Auckland University College, and her PhD from Victoria University College.

== Career ==
In 1957, she made the first regional study of phytoplankton in New Zealand. Later in life, she focused more on aquatic botany, and was appointed a research scientist on freshwater algae in the Botany Division of the Department of Scientific and Industrial Research (DSIR). In her career, she wrote over fifty papers and several books, including Marine Phytoplankton in New Zealand Waters and Checklists of the Freshwater Diatoms of New Zealand. Cooper also published Micro Algae – Microscopic Marvels which she writes to appeal to a more popular readership. She described thirteen species of micro and macroalgae, and has had six algae named after her: the brown alga Ectocarpus dellowianus, the dinoflagellate Gymnodinium cassieorum, and four diatoms, Fragilariforma cassieae, Frustulia cassieae, Gomphoneis minuta var. cassieae and Navicula cassieana.

Cassie Cooper garnered several awards and titles for her accomplishments, including an honorary research associateship by the Botany Department at University of Auckland and the Botany Division of DSIR, and an honorary life membership of the New Zealand Limnological Society and the New Zealand Marine Science Society. In the 1997 Queen's Birthday Honours, she was appointed a Member of the New Zealand Order of Merit, for services to marine biology. She was described as New Zealand's "leading expert" on diatoms.

Cassie Cooper was a founding member of the Australasian Society for Phycology and Aquatic Botany, the International Society of Diatomists, and the Asian Pacific Phycological Association. She retired in 1986.

In 2017, Cassie Cooper was selected as one of the Royal Society Te Apārangi's "150 women in 150 words", celebrating the contributions of women to knowledge in New Zealand.

The standard author abbreviation Cassie is used to indicate this person as the author when citing a botanical name.

== Personal life ==
In 1953, she married Richard Morrison Cassie, a fellow professor at the University of Auckland. They had two children. He died in 1974. She married Robert Cecil Cooper, a botanist, in 1984. Cooper would also predecease her.

Cooper was also a pianist and would teach part-time.

== Death ==
Cassie Cooper died on 5 July 2021.
