= Johan Heinrich Spalckhawer Siebke =

Norwegian entomologist

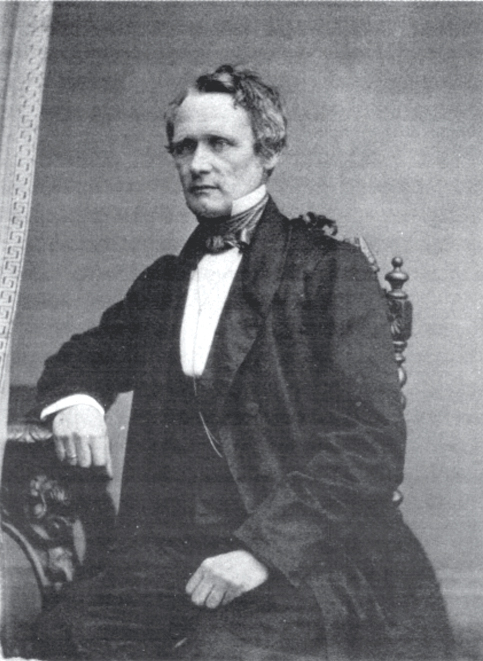

Johan Heinrich Spalckhawer Siebke (February 23, 1816 – 10 May 1875) was a Norwegian zoologist who established insect collections at the natural history museum of the University of Oslo and published the first major Norwegian book on insects.

Siebke was the son of Johan Siebke who was the German-born gardener who established the Tøyen botanical garden in Oslo. Siebke went to the University of Oslo and studied medicine, receiving a degree in 1843. He then became a teacher of natural history and worked at the Borgerskolen and Nissens school from 1856. He also became a curator at the zoological museum at the University of Oslo. In 1844 he went to Trondheim to arrange the royal cabinet. He also made visits to different parts of Norway to collect specimens. He published several short papers on insects in "Nyt Magazin for Naturvidenskaberne" and wrote some school textbooks but his major work was Enumeratio insectorum Norvegicorum in five fascicles from 1874 which was completed after his death by J. Sparre Schneider. This work was based on his collection of nearly 5000 species and nearly 24000 of his specimens went into the collections of Oslo University.
