= Hans-Christian Siebke =

German farmer and politician (1940–2023)

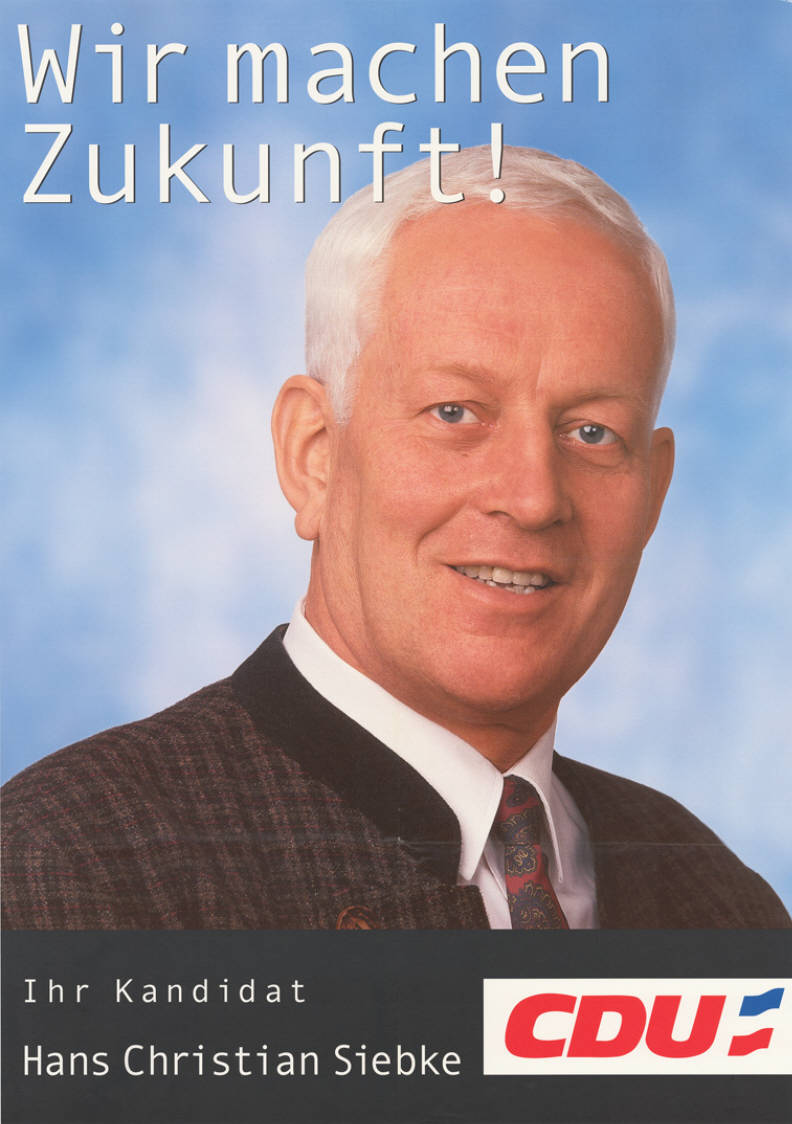
- Siebke 2000 campaign poster

Member of the Landtag of Schleswig-Holstein
- In office 23 April 1996 – 28 March 2000
- Constituency: Segeberg-Ost

Personal details
- Born: 13 July 1940 Neumünster, Gau Schleswig-Holstein, Germany
- Died: 15 February 2023 (aged 82)
- Party: CDU
- Occupation: Farmer

Hans-Christian Siebke (13 July 1940 – 15 February 2023) was a German farmer and politician. A member of the Christian Democratic Union, he served in the Landtag of Schleswig-Holstein from 1996 to 2000.

Siebke died on 15 February 2023, at the age of 82.
