= Haaken Hasberg Gran =

Norwegian botanist

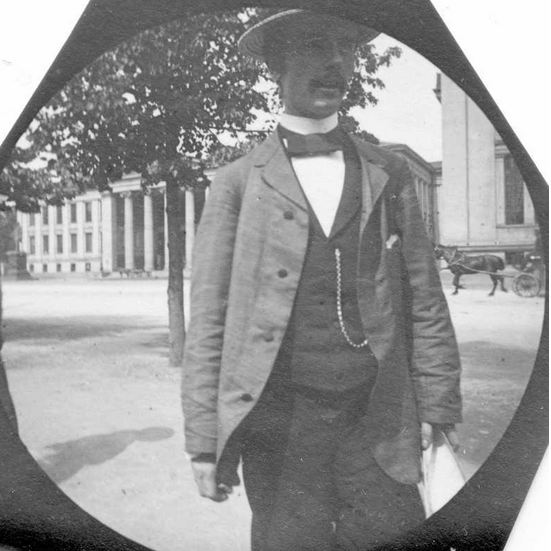
- Haaken Hasberg Gran photographed by fellow student Carl Størmer outside Det Kongelige Frederiks Universitet in the 1890s
- Born: 17 April 1870; Tønsberg
- Died: 2 June 1955 (aged 85); Oslo
- Citizenship: Norwegian
- Education: University of Oslo
- Scientific career
- Fields: algaeology marine zoology planktology
- Workplaces: Bergens Museum; University of Oslo
- Academic advisors: Nordal Wille; Johan Hjort
- Notable students: Trygve Braarud

Haaken Hasberg Gran (17 April 1870 – 2 June 1955) was a Norwegian botanist.

== Personal life ==
Gran was born in Tønsberg as the son of naval captain August Kriegsmann Gran (1844–1895) and his wife Agnes Hasberg (1846–1928). He was the paternal grandson of politician Jens Gran, nephew of businessperson Jens Gran, Jr., first cousin of aviator Tryggve Gran and second cousin of writer Gerhard Gran. He married Margrethe Kristofa Holm (1877–1932) in August 1897.

== Career ==
Gran finished his secondary education at Kristiania Cathedral School in 1888, and graduated from the Royal Frederick University with the cand.real. degree in 1894. In the same year he was hired as a lab assistant at the University Botanical Garden. He originally studied phycology under Nordal Wille, but from 1897 he worked with marine zoology under Johan Hjort, and together with hydrographer Fridtjof Nansen.

Gran especially concentrated on planktology, and took the doctorate in 1902 with the thesis Das Plankton des norwegischen Nordmeeres, following field study in the Norwegian Sea. In the same year he was among the founders of the International Council for the Exploration of the Sea. He worked as a research fellow at Bergens Museum from 1901 to 1905 and as a professor of botany and director of the University Botanical Garden in Kristiania from 1905 to 1940. Notable publications include the German-language Diatomeen (1908), Pelagic Plant Life (1912) and A quantitative study of the phytoplankton in the Bay of Fundy and Gulf of Maine (with Trygve Braarud, 1935). The two former were used as reference works in education for several decades.

He was a member of Norwegian Academy of Science and Letters, the Royal Swedish Academy of Sciences and the Royal Danish Academy of Sciences and Letters. He was awarded the Alexander Agassiz Medal in 1938, and was a Knight of the Danish Order of the Dannebrog, the Swedish Order of the Polar Star and the Turkish Order of the Medjidie.

Gran was also a choir singer, a keen horticulturalist (chairman of the Norwegian Horticulture Society from 1908 to 1938), vice chairman of the Norwegian-British Friendship Society from 1921 to 1929 and a member of the Oxford Group. He died in 1955 in Oslo.

Awards
Preceded by Bjørn Helland-Hansen	Recipient of the Alexander Agassiz Medal; 1934	Succeeded by Martin Knudsen
