= Nonneseter Abbey, Oslo =

Benedictine nunnery located in Oslo, Norway

Coordinates: 59°54′31″N 10°46′05″E

Nonneseter Abbey, Oslo (Nonneseter kloster i Oslo), was a Benedictine convent located in Oslo, Norway, active between the 12th and 16th centuries.

== History ==
Nonneseter Abbey is mentioned for the first time in 1161, but was founded before that, possibly by as much as several decades earlier. It was dedicated to the Virgin Mary.

The community quickly became wealthy under the leadership of influential abbesses from some of the country's highest-born families.

The abbesses are only partially known from official documents. The abbess Elin Jonsdatter, for example, is mentioned only between 1459 and 1476, when several documents of her financial and business transactions are preserved.

Perhaps because the members of the convent were from Norway's elite families, the fate of the convent under the Reformation was less harsh than that of many other monastic communities. While the convent was formally dissolved during the Reformation, it seems that the nuns were allowed to remain in residence for several decades afterwards, perhaps until the end of the 16th century.

The abbey's estates passed into other hands in 1547, from which time the buildings began to decay, and in 1616 the walls of the former abbey church were used as a quarry for building stone for the new town hall.

== Site and buildings ==
The site of the abbey, and any remains, are apparently under the buildings at Schweigaardsgate 55 and Grønlandsleiret 73.

There are no visible remains. When Schweigaardsgate was re-developed in 1879, the corner of a building in worked stone was discovered, which was believed to be the south-west corner of the abbey church. Large portions of the rest of the church's remains may well have been destroyed during the construction of Schweigaardsgate 50 in 1887. Various other finds of stonework and skeletons in the area indicate possible sites of other remains.

== Literary reference ==
The abbey is perhaps best known as the place where the novelist Sigrid Undset set her character the young Kristin Lavransdatter in the first volume, Kransen (1920), of the eponymous trilogy, during which Kristin was placed there in a form of schooling under the abbess Groa.

== Abbesses ==
The abbesses are not fully known. The known abbesses are mentioned with the dates they are mentioned:

- Gro (Groa), mentioned in 1299, 1336.
- Gunnhild, 1334.
- Elin, 1336, 1347.
- Thora, 1351.
- Sigrid, 1357, 1360.
- Margreta, 1388/1389.
- Gudrun Amundsdatter, 1389/1390.
- Katarine, 1418-1439.
- Eilin Jonsdatter, 1459-1476.
- Ingrid Bjørnsdatter, 1485- 1500.
- Margrete Nilsdatter, 1510 - 1520.
- Karen Eriksdatter, 1530- 1537.
- Elen Halvardsdatter, 1544.

== Other Sources ==
- Bull, E. (1922): Kristianias historie, vol. 1: Oslos historie. Kristiania.
- Fischer, G. (1950): Oslo under Eikaberg, pp. 131–132. Oslo
