= Tøyen =

Neighborhood of Oslo

Coordinates: 59°55′N 10°47′E

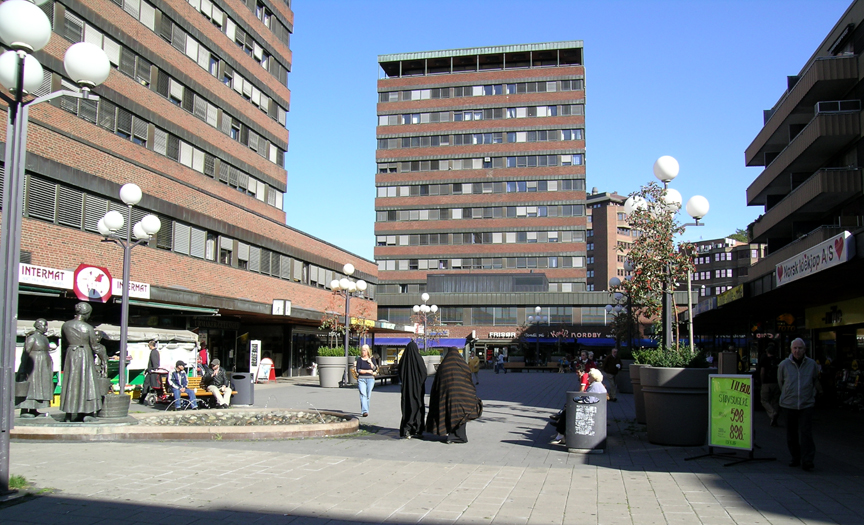
Tøyen sentrum

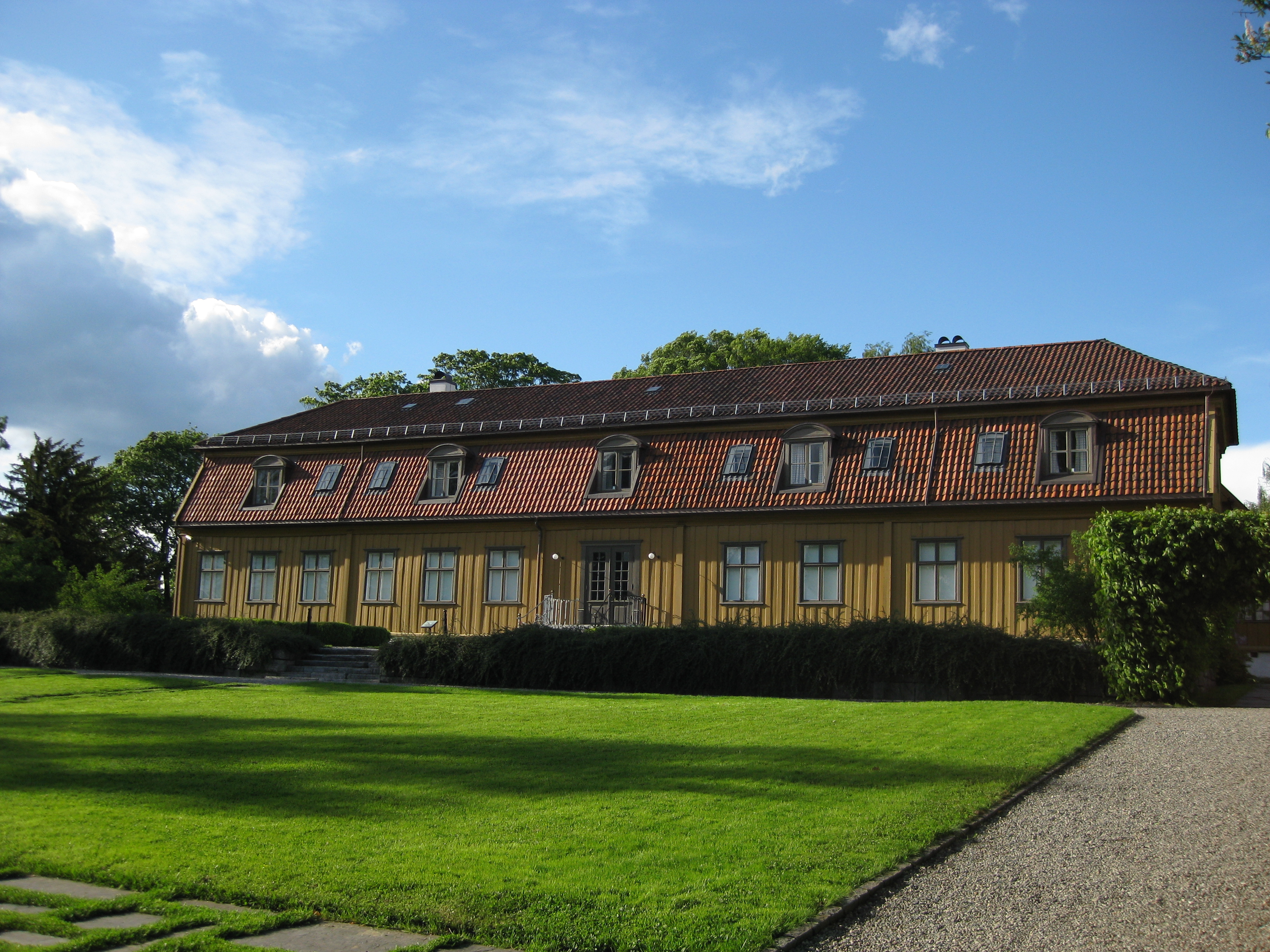
Tøyen Manor, University Botanical Garden (Oslo) at Tøyen

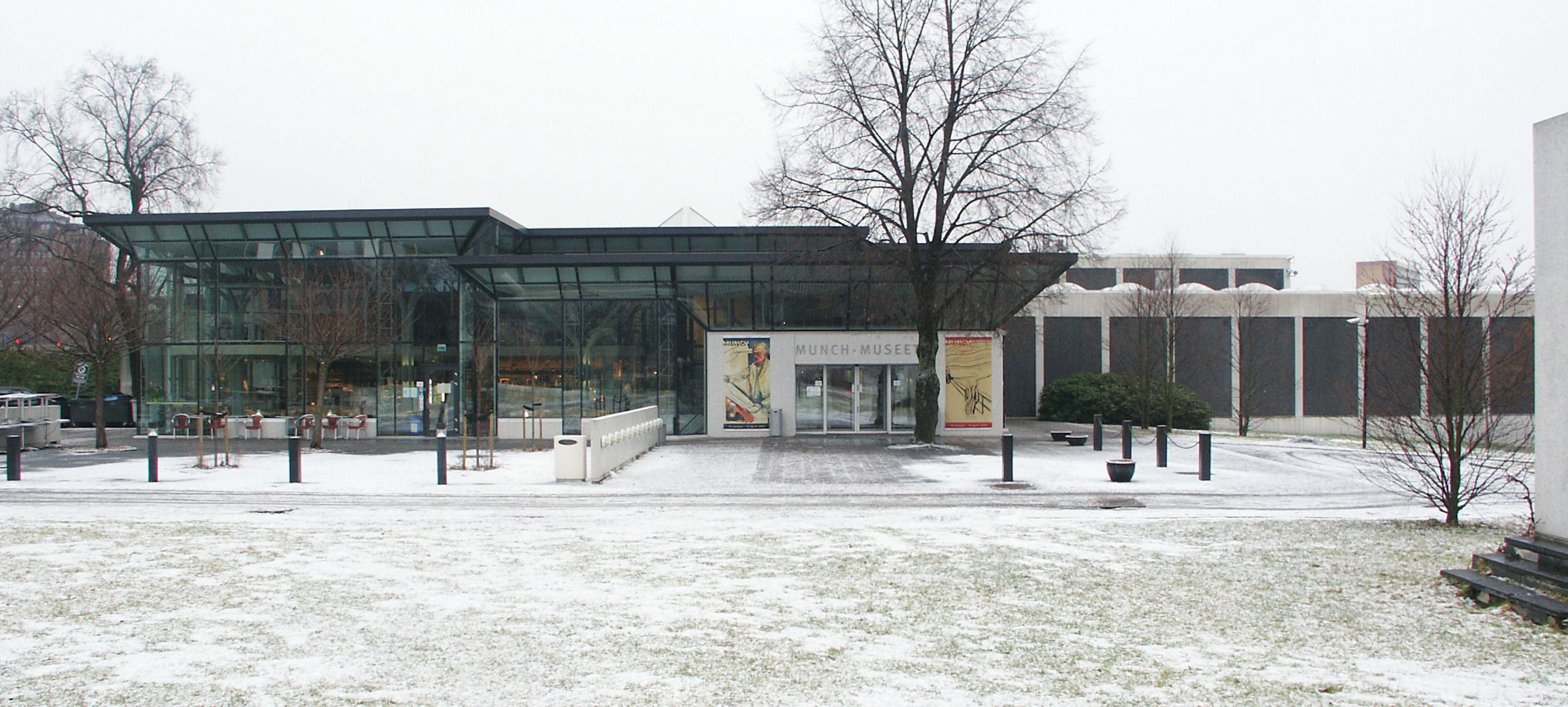
The Munch Museum, Tøyen. Architects: Einar Myklebust and Gunnar Fougner

Tøyen is a residential area in the central parts of Oslo, Norway, part of the borough of Gamle Oslo.

== Location ==
There are two different stations which carry the name Tøyen. Tøyen Railway Station is located on the Gjøvik Line, while Tøyen T-bane Station on the shared stretch just east of the downtown area. The railway station is about 750 metres northeast of the subway station.

Above the Tøyen subway station is a shopping centre. Apart from the Munch Museum, there is a park north of the subway station with botanical gardens and paleontological, geological and zoological museums.

Tøyen has been associated with social problems such as poverty associated with the high number of immigrants to Norway living there.

== Tøyen Manor ==
The area is named after Tøyen Manor (Tøyen hovedgaard), one of the former large estates in Oslo. Tøyen was originally a property owned by the Nonneseter Abbey. The current Manor House was built in 1679 and is one of Oslo's oldest timber buildings. Norway's Chancellor Jens Bjelke acquired the property about 1620. When the Chancellor died 1659, and his youngest son Jørgen Bjelke inherited the estate. City magistrate Johan Lausen Bull sold the farm to King Frederik VI in 1812, whereupon the king gave the farm to the University of Christiania. In 1814 work began on the University Botanical Garden.

The main building was restored in 2006-07. The interior was restored to the period from the late 1700s to early 1800s. Today the former the newly restored manor provides reception rooms for the University of Oslo. Tøyen Manor is situated in the University Botanical Garden. The house is currently owned by the Museum of Natural History at the University of Oslo.

== The name ==
(Norse Tǫðin, from originally *Taðvin). The first element is tað n 'manure', the last element is vin f 'meadow'. The meaning is 'the fertilized meadow'.
