= Planktology =

Study of plankton

Planktology is the study of plankton, various small drifting plants, animals and microorganisms that inhabit bodies of water. Planktology topics include primary production, energy flow and the carbon cycle.

Plankton drive the "biological pump", a process by which the ocean ecosystem transports carbon from the surface euphotic zone to the ocean's depths. Such processes are vital to carbon dioxide sinks, one of several possibilities for countering global warming. Modern planktology includes behavioral aspects of drifting organisms, engaging modern in situ imaging devices.

Some planktology projects allow the public to participate online, such as the Long-term Ecosystem Observatory.

There are a very large number of, often closely related or similar looking, plankton species which makes classification a challenge for scientists. Their habitat also adds challenges to their study.

== Notable planktologists ==
- Karl Banse
- Sayed ElSayed
- Paul Falkowski
- Gotthilf Hempel
- Victor Hensen
- Uwe Kils
- Johannes Krey
- Jürgen Lenz
- Vivienne Cassie Cooper

== See also ==
- Marine biology
- Biological oceanography
