= University Botanical Garden (Oslo) =

Botanical garden in Oslo, Norway

Coordinates: 59°55′05″N 10°46′14″E

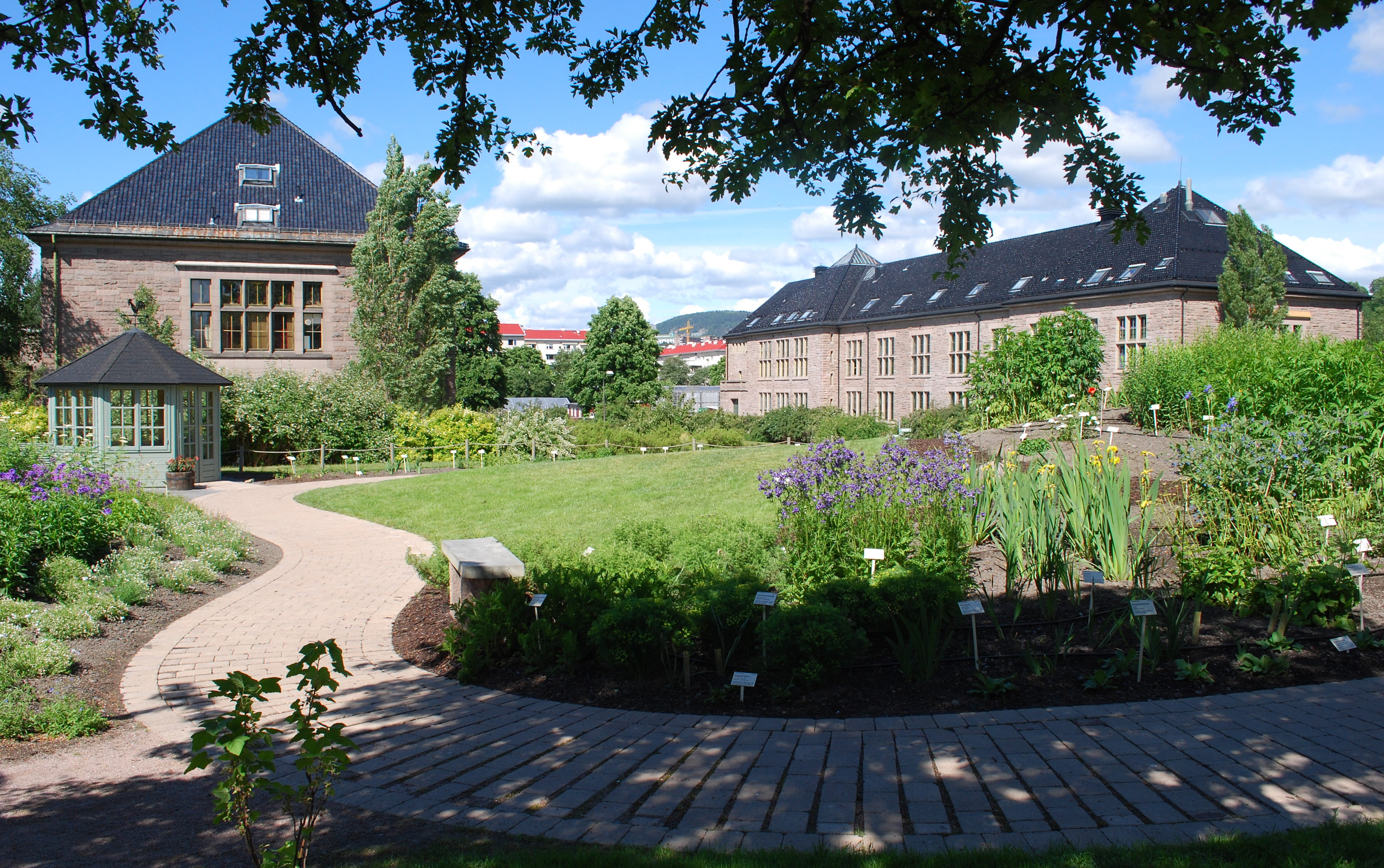
The University Botanical Garden

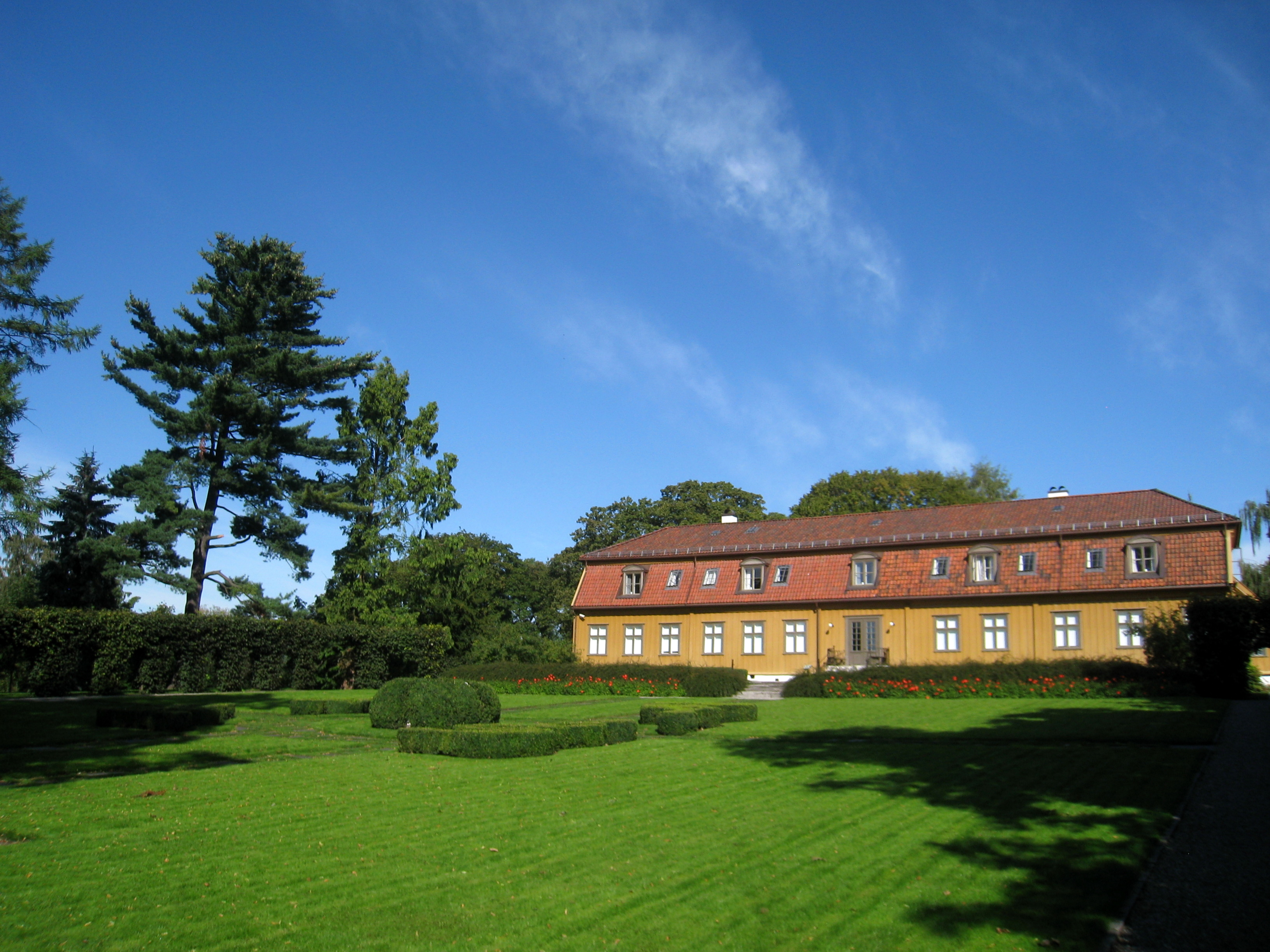
Tøyen hovedgaard

The University Botanical Garden (Botanisk hage) is Norway's oldest botanical garden. It was first established in 1814 and is administered by the University of Oslo. It is situated in the neighborhood of Tøyen in Oslo, Norway.

== Tøyen Manor ==
The Tøyen estate is rich in history, and the main wing is probably the oldest wooden building in greater Oslo. Tøyen i Aker was originally an estate owned by the Nonneseter Abbey. Norway's Chancellor Jens Bjelke acquired the property about 1640.

King Frederik VI of Denmark later acquired the estate and subsequently gifted the property to the University of Christiania in 1812. In 1814, work began on the University Botanical Garden. The University of Oslo's oldest building, Tøyen Manor (Tøyen hovedgaard), is located in the garden. Today the historic Tøyen Manor houses temporary exhibitions and a café for staff and visitors.

== Botanical Garden ==
The University Botanical Garden (Oslo), founded in 1814, belongs to the Natural History Museum of the University of Oslo. Through research, education and plant conservation, the garden seeks to increase public awareness of the importance of plant diversity. The plant collections contain approx. 7500 species.

Johan Siebke was the botanical gardener at the Botanical Garden from the date of establishment. He contributed greatly to the planning and construction of the botanical garden and to the operation during the next first 40 years. The garden originally covered 75,000 square metres, but has since doubled in size. Botanical Museum (Botanisk museum) which dated to 1863 was merged with the Botanical Garden in 1975. The collection includes roughly 35,000 plants of about 7,500 unique species.

== Museums ==
The Natural History Museum at the University of Oslo is Norway's most comprehensive natural history collection. A selection of specimens are on display for the general public, in the Geological Museum and the Zoological Museum. The Natural History Museum in Oslo is where you can see the famous fossil known as "Ida", the oldest primate fossil known and the most complete fossil of an early primate. She was bought by the museum in 2007, and presented to the world in 2009.

The geological museum was established in 1917 by Waldemar Christofer Brøgger.

== Gallery ==
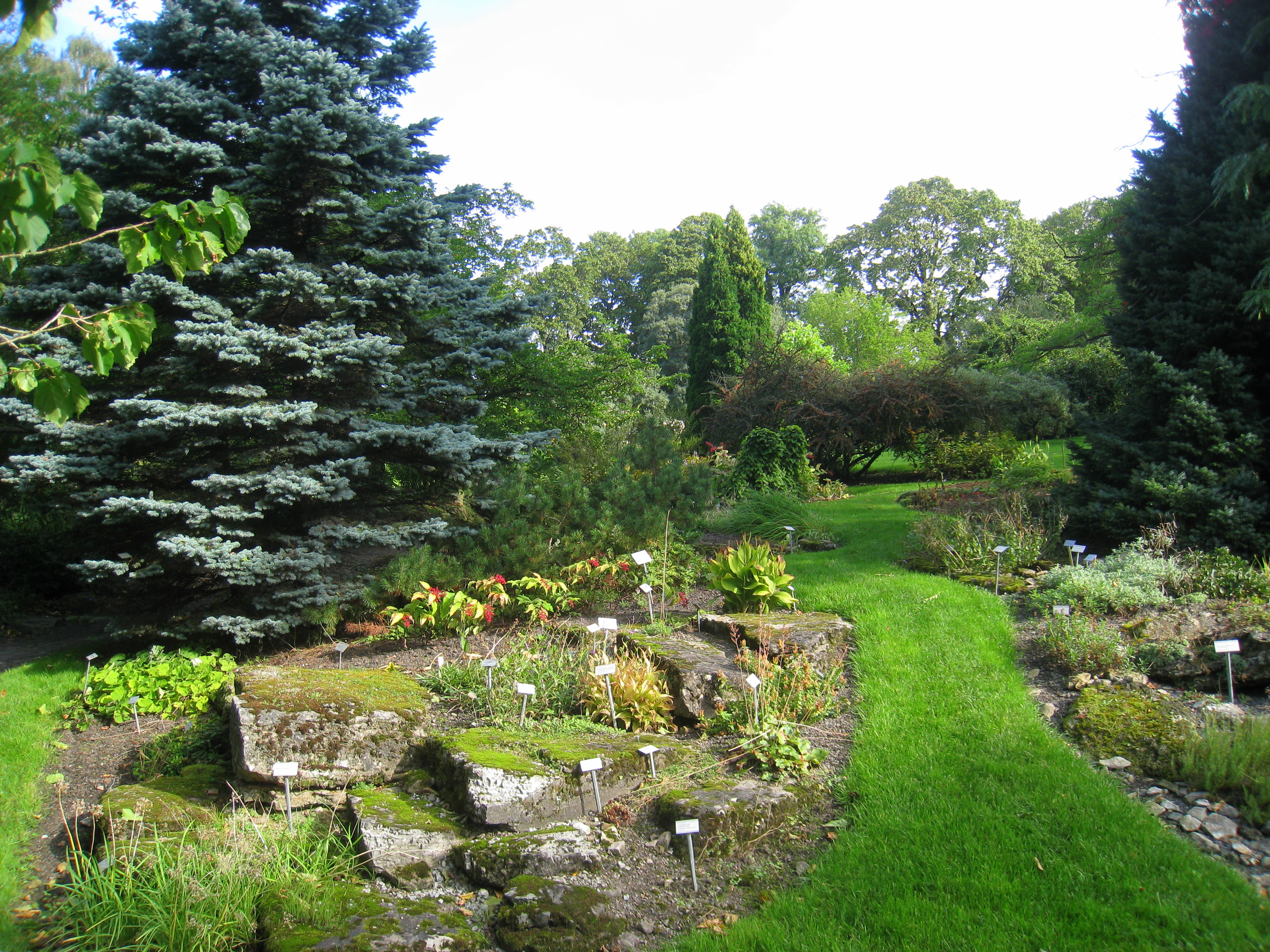

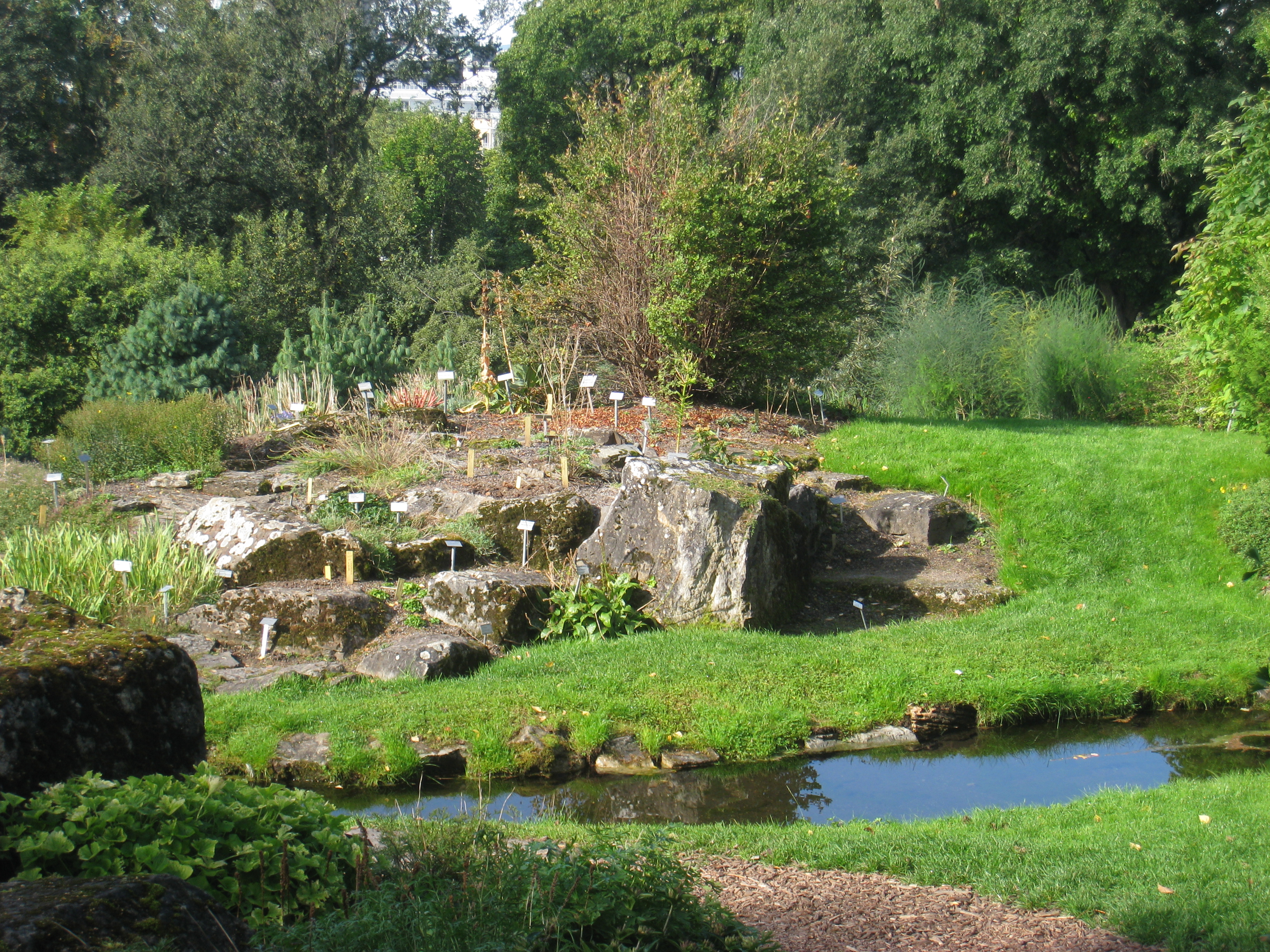

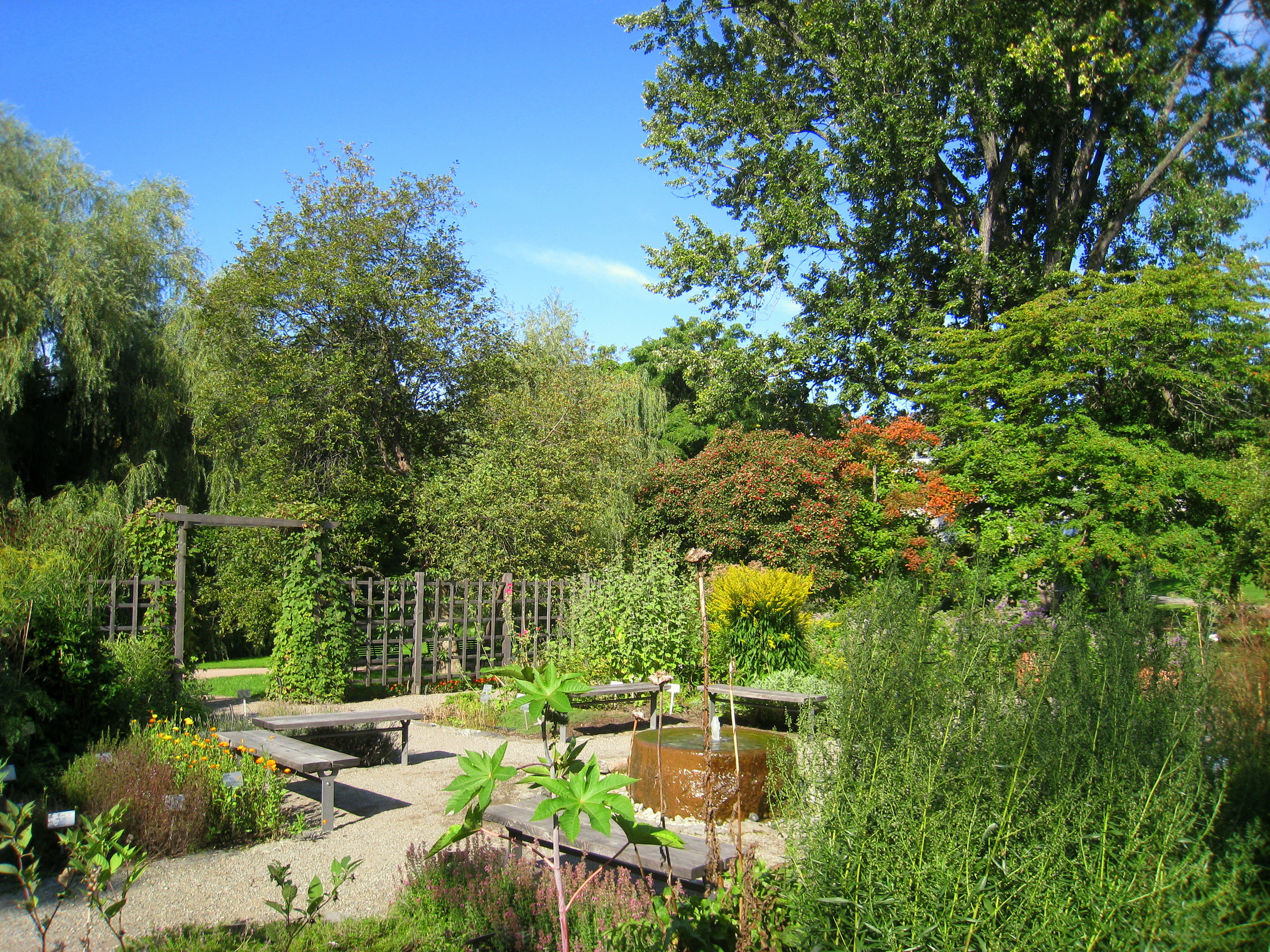

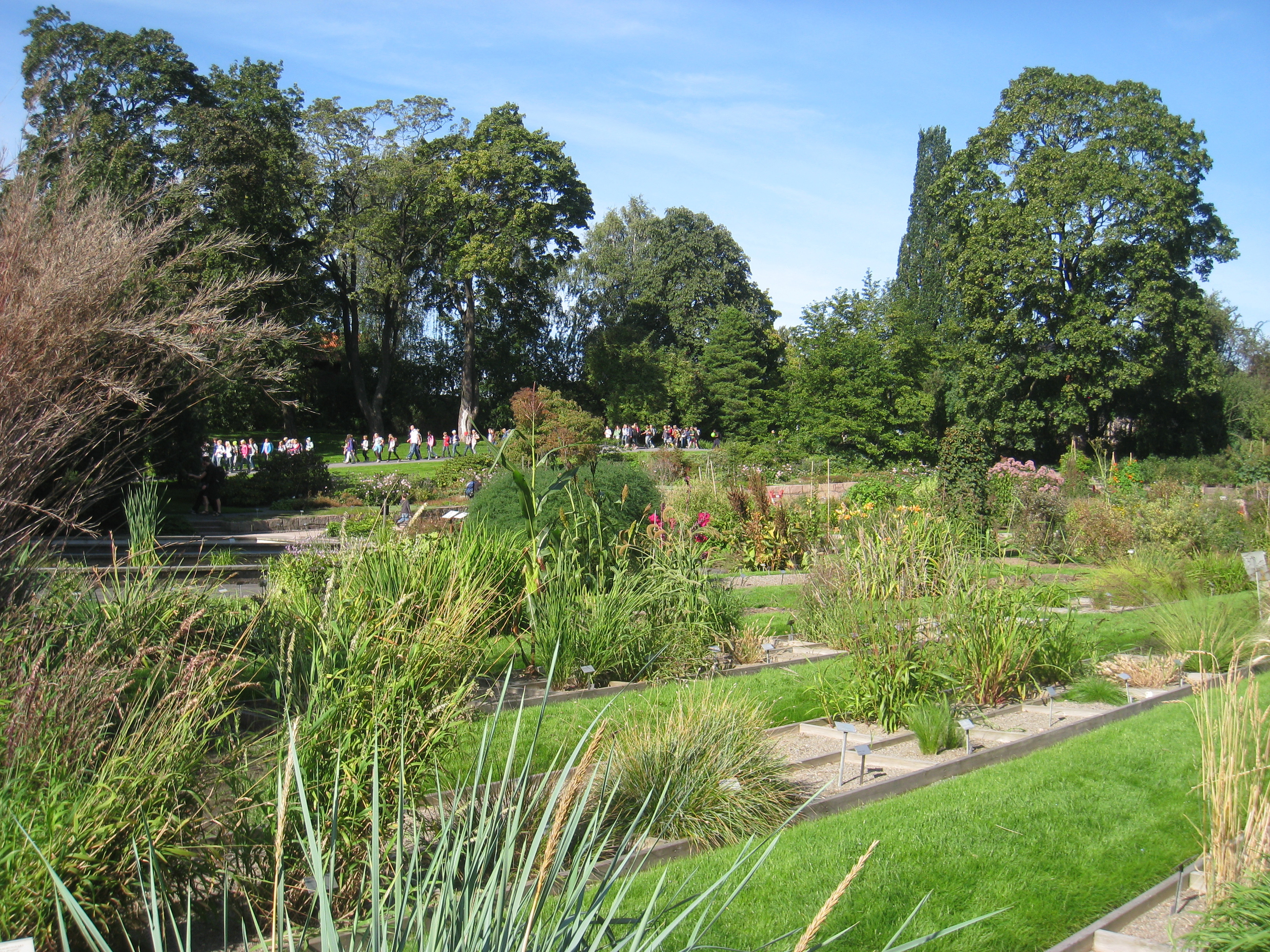

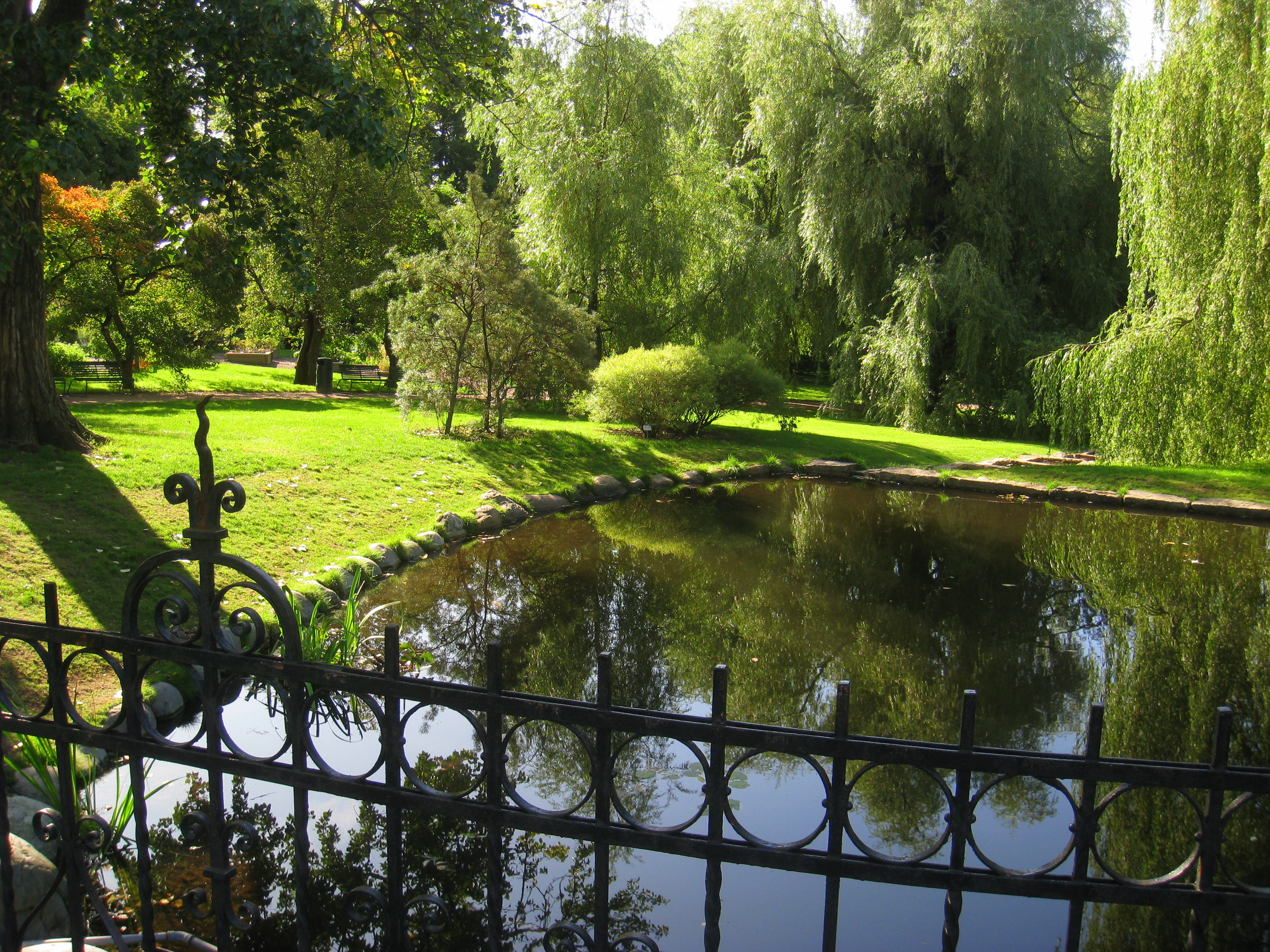

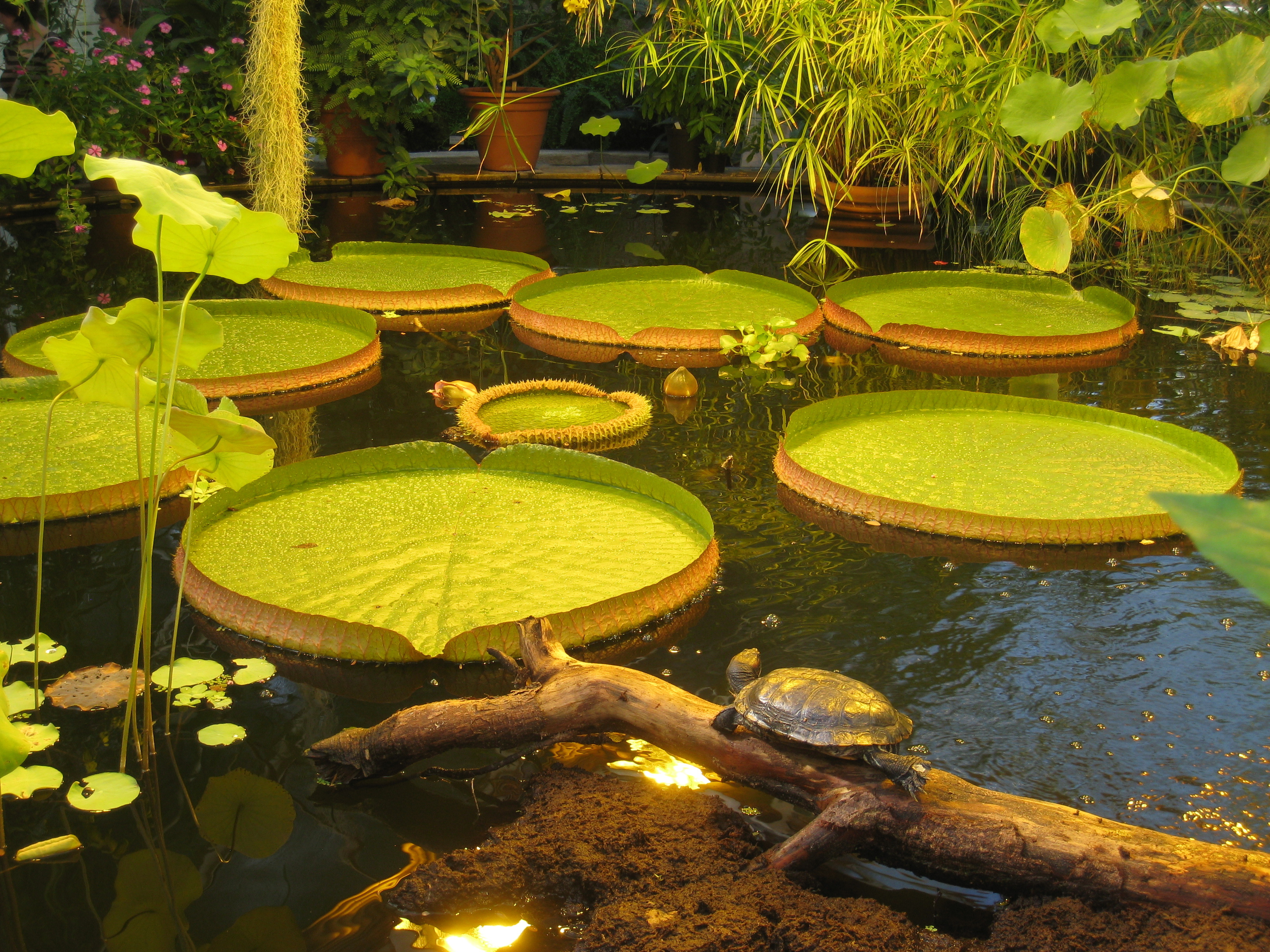

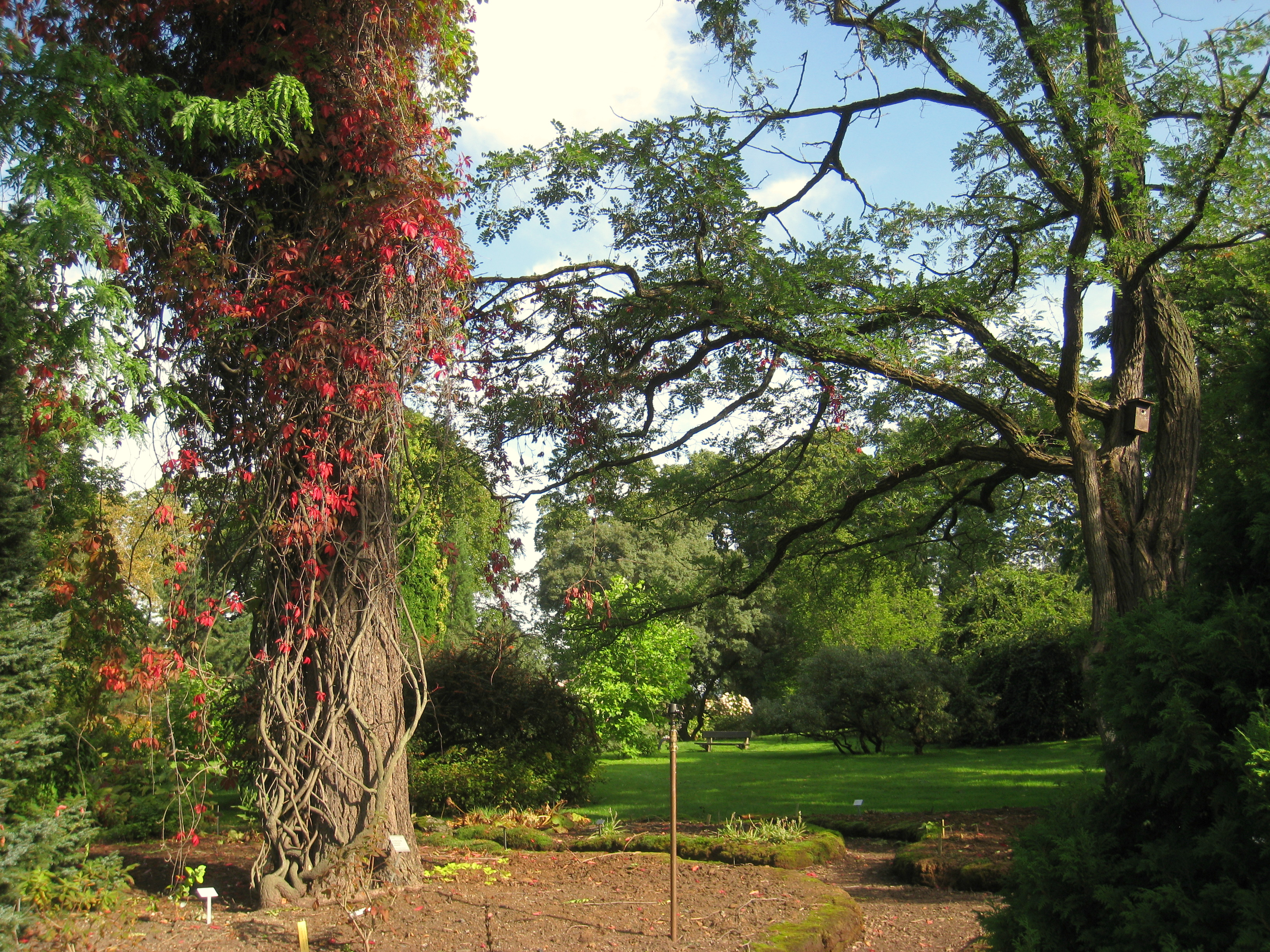

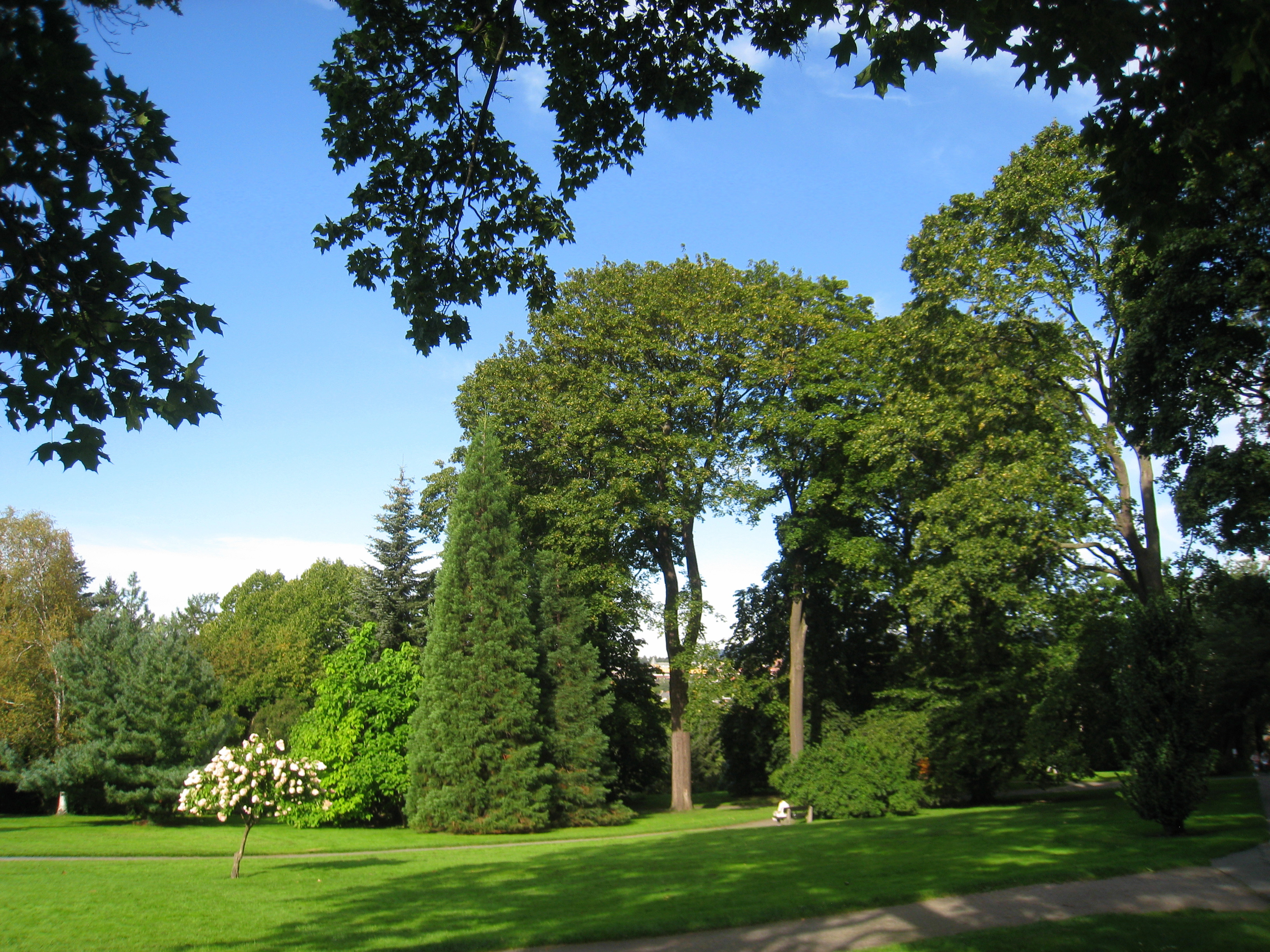

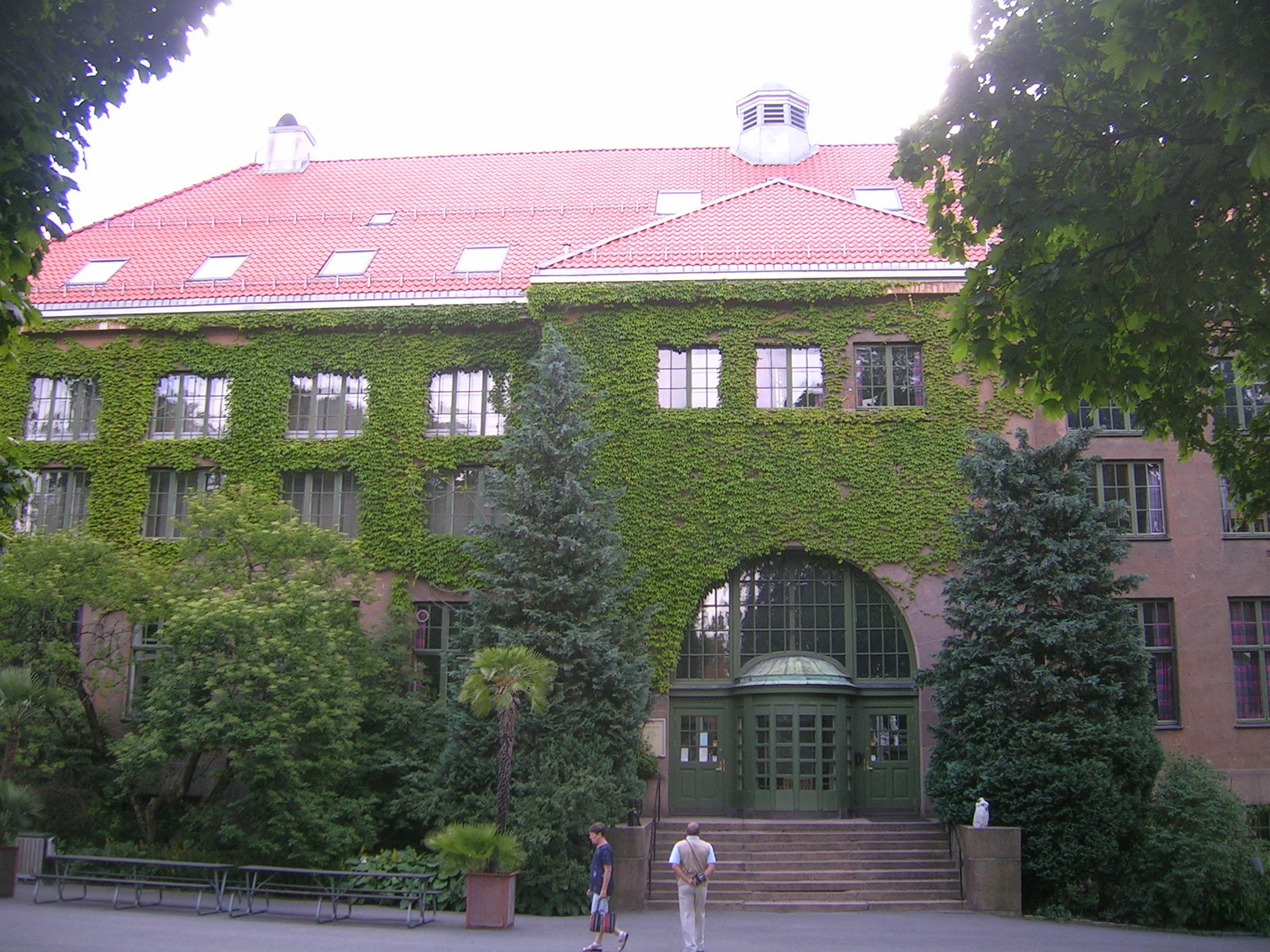

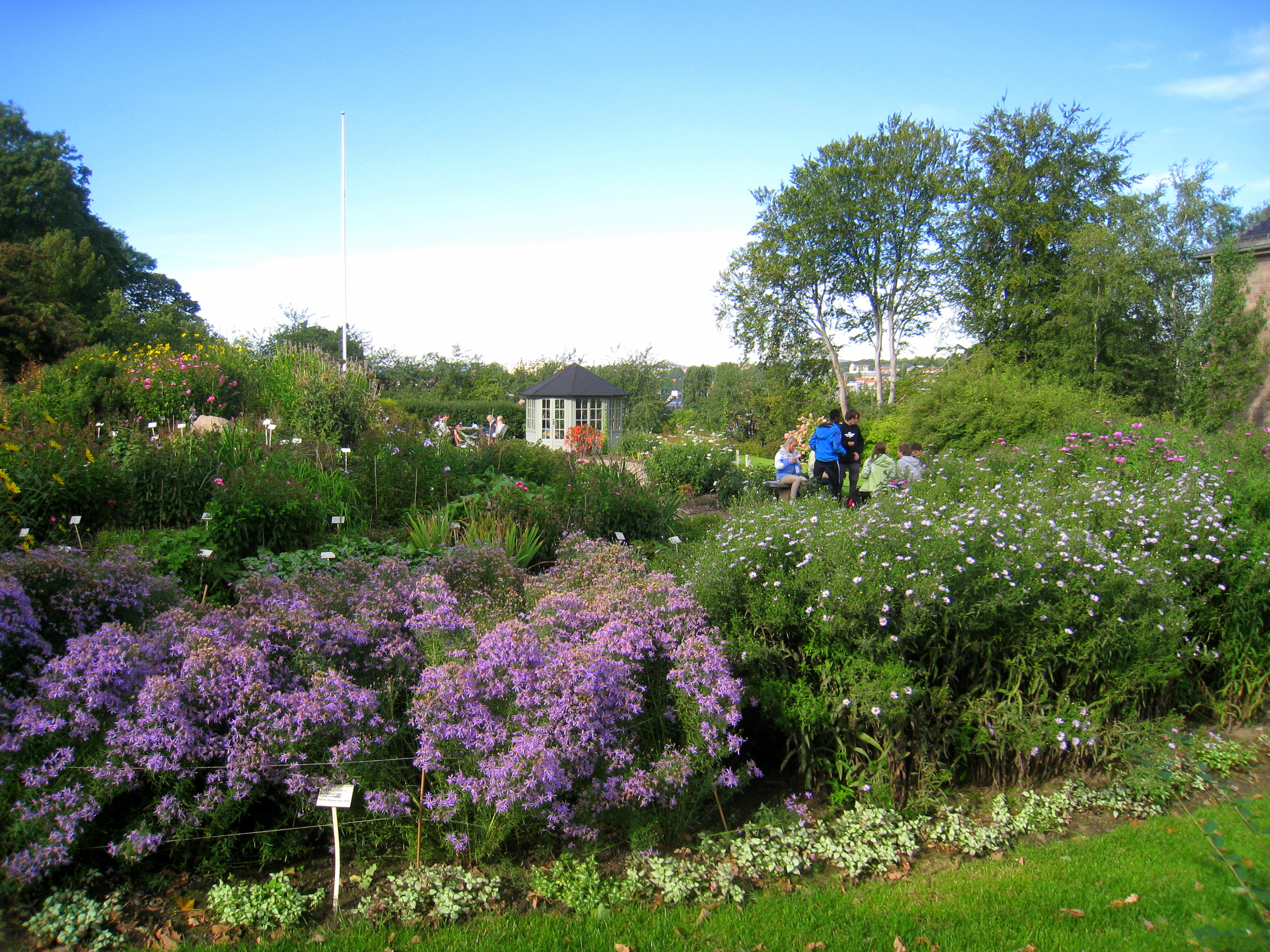
