= Trygve Braarud =

Norwegian botanist (1903–1985)

- Born: 15 September 1903; Verdal Municipality
- Died: 9 July 1985 (aged 81); Oslo
- Citizenship: Norwegian
- Education: University of Oslo
- Scientific career
- Fields: marine biology planktology
- Workplaces: University of Oslo
- Academic advisors: Haaken Hasberg Gran
- Notable students: Grethe Rytter Hasle

Trygve Braarud (15 September 1903 – 9 July 1985) was a Norwegian botanist. He specialized in marine biology, and was affiliated with the University of Oslo for most of his career.

== Career ==
He was born in Verdal Municipality, and had ten older siblings as well as a twin sister. He received some of his early schooling at a private teaching institution founded by his father. He finished his secondary education at Trondheim Cathedral School in 1921, and graduated from the University of Oslo with the cand.real. degree in 1927. In his early career he published the work The 'Øst' Expedition to the Denmark Strait 1929 in two volumes. The first volume, Hydrography, was published together with J. T. Ruud in 1932. The second volume, The Phytoplankton and its Conditions of Growth came in 1935 and earned Braarud the dr.philos. degree. He had taken up planktology as a research assistant of Haaken Hasberg Gran at the botanical laboratory, a position he held from 1926 to 1933. From 1934 to 1936 he was a research fellow of plant physiology; in 1935 he spent some time working with August Krogh in Denmark. Braarud then worked as an associate professor at the University of Oslo from 1936 to 1947, and then as a professor of marine biology from 1947.

He co-founded Norske havforskeres forening in 1949, and was its spokesperson from 1962 to 1965. He was also a vice president of the Scientific Committee on Oceanic Research. He was a member of the Norwegian Academy of Science and Letters from 1942, the Royal Swedish Society of Sciences and Letters in Gothenburg from 1959 and the Royal Danish Academy of Sciences and Letters from 1963. He died in 1985 in Oslo.

He was honored in 1947, when botanist Georges Victor Deflandre published Braarudosphaera, a type of Algae in Compt. Rend. Hebd. Seances Acad. Sci. vol.225 on page 439 in 1947.
