= Norwegian Horticulture Society =

Logo.

The Norwegian Horticultural Society (Norwegian: Det norske hageselskap, often shortened to Hageselskapet) is an interest organisation in Norway.

It was established as Selskabet Havedyrkningens Venner in 1884. Its purpose is to promote gardening interests. It issues the magazine Norsk Hagetidend. Chairman of the board is Ole Petter Vik, and the organizational headquarters are in Oslo. Queen Sonja of Norway has matronage over the society.
