= Andreas Strand (entomologist) =

Norwegian entomologist

- Born: June 11, 1895; Haugesund, Norway
- Died: February 8, 1980 (aged 84); Oslo, Norway
- Occupation: Entomologist

Andreas Strand (June 11, 1895 – February 8, 1980) was a Norwegian entomologist that specialized in Nordic beetles. Strand became a member of the Norwegian Entomological Society in 1920, and he is one of the leading figures in Norwegian entomology. His professional career included work as an administrator, secretary, vice chairman, and accountant.

After passing his examen artium, Andreas Strand graduated from the Telegraph School and later joined the Telegraph Service in Haugesund. In 1917 he moved to Kristiania and received a position with the Telegraph Board. Later he worked as head of the foreign affairs department, a position he held until he retired. He became interested in nature and insects at an early age, already in middle school. In 1914, he was in Stavanger, where he met Tor Helliesen, who was the manager of the Stavanger Museum. Helliesen was particularly interested in beetles (Coleoptera) and had a large collection from Rogaland, and he recommended that Strand start collecting beetles. Together they went on an excursion, and Stand was introduced to the collection and preparation of insects. However, it was not until 1917, when he moved to Kristiania, that Strand's interest was seriously awakened.

Strand had no formal education in zoology (or entomology), and he said that this was a conscious choice, reckoning that a full-time entomologist had to deal with a lot of paperwork. Strand also took many trips abroad as part of his work in the Telegraph Service, but he did not collect beetles from abroad; he stated that his interest was limited to Nordic species. When abroad, the Telegraph Board delegation was often met by foreign beetle researchers that wanted to meet Strand.

== Beetles ==
Strand first concentrated on Palearctic ground beetles in the genus Carabus. This collection was later left to Lund University, which already had a large collection of ground beetles collected by Carl H. Lindroth. Strand then concentrated on collecting beetles, especially from northern Norway. He made several contributions to the knowledge of northern Norwegian beetles, the first in 1932. His main work, a book of over 600 pages called Nord-Norges Coleoptera (Northern Norway's Coleoptera), was published in 1946.

Strand was skilled at taxonomic details and solved several ambiguities in difficult beetle genres. He contributed to a better overview the systematics of beetle species. Altogether, he described 49 beetle species that were new to science. It is said that Strand would take a cigar box to a meeting of the Norwegian Entomological Society, and in the box was a needle, with a "small black dot" on it, a small beetle. He could then tell a long story about this "dot," such as that it was new to Norway and had previously only been found in the Caucasus or something similar. Strand often used unconventional methods to find beetles. After flood periods in rivers, he collected loose material that was washed ashore. This was carefully examined and often contained large numbers of small insects. He also examined animals' nests, which often yielded rare species. Another method was the use of chicken dung as a bait to attract beetles. He also used to drive a car with a net hanging out of the car window, or moped along forest roads, while holding the net out from the handlebars. This proved to be a good method for catching small swarming beetles.

Strand's insect collection with Nordic beetles can be found at the Bergen Zoological Museum. It contains approximately 80,000 specimens, divided into 4,609 species. In addition to the collection itself, Strand's notes and library are also kept at the museum.

== Honors and awards ==
In 1965, Strand was appointed doctor honoris causa at the University of Bergen. That same year, he received the King's Medal of Merit in Gold for his research achievements. He was an honorary member of the Norwegian Entomological Society and several other Nordic entomological societies.

== Publications ==
Andreas Strand authored more than 120 publications, most of which were published in the Norwegian Journal of Entomology. Astrid Løken compiled a list of Strand's publications in her article series on Scandinavian entomologists.
