= Schøyen =

Schøyen is a surname. Notable people with the surname include:

- Carl Schøyen (1877–1951) Norwegian author
- Erna Schøyen (1887–1968) Norwegian actress
- Hege Schøyen (born 1957), Norwegian singer, actor, and comedian
- Martin Schøyen (born 1940), Norwegian businessman, historian, and book collector
- Per G. Schøyen (1924–2017), Norwegian diplomat
- Rolf Schøyen (born 1936) Norwegian physician and medical microbiologist
- Thor Hiorth Schøyen (1885–1961) First curator of the Oslo Zoological Museum in 1908
- Wilhelm Maribo Schøyen (1844–1918) Norwegian entomologist
