= Karl Haanshus =

Norwegian entomologist and physician (1860–1936)

- Born: December 26, 1860; Kristiania, Norway
- Died: January 3, 1936 (aged 74)
- Occupation: Entomologist

Karl Harald Adolf Haanshus (December 26, 1860 – January 3, 1936) was a Norwegian physician and entomologist. He joined the Norwegian Entomological Society in 1915. He was its vice chairman from 1933 to 1935, and he was also a member of the editorial committee of the Norwegian Journal of Entomology.

Haanshus was born in Kristiania (now Oslo). He received a medical degree in 1888 and practiced for ten years as a city physician (bylege) in Fredrikstad. He then moved back to Kristiania, where he worked as a pediatrician until his death on January 3, 1936.

Haanshus took an early interest in nature and insects, especially butterflies. He also processed the material from Ørjan Olsen's expedition to Siberia, Carl Sofus Lumholtz's trip to Borneo, and Alf Wollebæk's expedition to the Galápagos Islands.

== Publications ==
Haanshus published a number of articles, especially in Norsk Entomologisk Tidsskrift. Most of these examine butterflies, including one in which he listed 350 species—of which 26 were new to Norway—from Nesodden, where he had a summer residence. His most significant work is "Fortegnelse over Norges Lepidoptera" (List of Norwegian Lepidoptera, 1933).

- 1916: "Lepidopterolog. Meddelelser". Meddelelser fra Entomologisk Forening 6.
- 1920: "B. Lepidoptera, ab Anders Orvin lecta, Macrepidoptera". Norsk Entomologisk Tidsskrift 1: 10–17.
- 1921: "Fortegnelse over Macrolepidoptera samlede ved Spro paa Nesodden". Norsk Entomologisk Tidsskrift 1: 100–113.
- 1922: "Nye fund og finnnesteder". Norsk Entomologisk Tidsskrift 1: 160.
- 1923: "Nye fund og finnnesteder". Norsk Entomologisk Tidsskrift 1: 251.
- 1924: "Mindre meddelelser. En sommerfuglhistorie". Norsk Entomologisk Tidsskrift 2: 56.
- 1927: "Nye fund og finnnesteder". Norsk Entomologisk Tidsskrift 2: 152-153.
- 1928: "Fortegnelse over Macrolepidoptera samlet ved Spro paa Nesodden". Norsk Entomologisk Tidsskrift 2: 250–255.
- 1930: "Nye fund og finnnesteder". Norsk Entomologisk Tidsskrift 2: 360.
- 1933: "Fortegnelse over Norges Lepidoptera". Norsk Entomologisk Tidsskrift 3: 1–73, 165–217.
- 1935: "Nye fund og finnnesteder". Norsk Entomologisk Tidsskrift 3: 408.
