= Ejnar Fischer =

Norwegian entomologist (1877–1930)

- Born: 1877; Kristiania, Norway
- Died: February 8, 1930 (aged 52–53)
- Occupation: Entomologist

Ejnar Fischer (1877 – February 8, 1930) was a Norwegian engineer and entomologist. He especially collected beetles, many from his time spent in Australia. He was one of the founders of the Norwegian Entomological Society, which was established in 1904.

== Career ==
Fischer passed his university entrance exam in 1895. He later attended the Norwegian Military Academy. He graduated in 1903 with a bachelor's degree in electrical engineering from the Royal College of Technology in Germany.

He was employed by the Swedish company ASEA and was involved in the installation of Tyssedal Hydroelectric Power Station and the Notodden Saltpeter Factory. From 1912 to 1925 he worked as the chief engineer at the Swedish–Australian company Gardner Waern & Co. in Melbourne, Australia.

He became interested at an early age in nature and insects. In particular, beetles (Coleoptera) caught his interest. During his stay in Australia, he caught beetles on his travels to various places on the continent and in the light of powerful arc lamps (the light trap technique). Electric light was quite new at that time, and insects are attracted to light.

This made a great impression, and newspapers often printed long articles about the phenomenon. The number of beetles Fischer captured was far lower than other groups such as butterflies and moths, which are attracted to light sources. His collection included about 3,500 species, but this was only a fraction of the total species available. He stated that "being an entomologist in Australia was like being a cow in a meadow of clover." In 1925, Fischer had to leave Australia due to health problems, and he moved back to Norway.

He still had contact with Australian entomologists and he organized his large collection of Australian beetles. His large beetle collection and specialized literature can be found in the insect collection at the Natural History Museum in Oslo today. At the time it was assembled, this collection was of a size that few other museums outside Australia had. He shared some of his experiences in an article in the Norwegian Journal of Entomology.

Fischer created many illustrations of insects in his diaries between 1900 and 1904. During his stay in Australia, Fischer suffered from Spanish flu and then pneumonia, forcing him to return to Norway. He died on February 8, 1930, after a long illness.
