= Leif Reinhardt Natvig =

Norwegian entomologist

- Born: March 8, 1894; Kristiania, Norway
- Died: November 14, 1975 (aged 81)
- Occupation: Entomologist

Leif Reinhardt Natvig (March 8, 1894 – November 14, 1975) was a Norwegian entomologist. He was employed throughout his entire career at the Oslo Zoological Museum, and he contributed to a stronger connection between the museum and the Norwegian Entomological Society.

Natvig became interested in nature and insects at an early age, especially beetles. Later he started studying mosquitoes, horseflies, and botflies. In addition to entomology, he collected ivory work, weapons, and first editions of illustrated books. One of the highlights of his life was meeting Emperor Hirohito during a visit to Tokyo in 1965. Natvig brought with him some Norwegian publications on marine biology, including from the Norwegian Sea. It is said that what would have usually been a short audience lasted for two hours, while the emperor and Natvig eagerly leafed through the publications.

== University of Oslo / Zoological Museum ==
Leif Reinhardt Natvig had a lifelong engagement at the Oslo Zoological Museum. He was admitted to the University of Oslo in 1913, and not long afterward was employed as a research assistant to Nils J. T. Odhner, the director of the Oslo Zoological Museum. In 1916 he entered the vacancy as a conservator at the museum. The insect collection at the museum had grown and it had too little space. Natvig reorganized the large insect collection, which took several years. It was not until 1922 that he received his first degree in zoology. In 1948 he became the museum's chief conservator. He held this position for only one year, and then in 1949 he became director of the museum. He retired in 1964. His insect collection can be found at the Natural History Museum in Oslo today.

Natvig lectured for almost 40 years at the University of Oslo on terrestrial arthropods. He frequently gave other lectures, including at the Oslo Folk Academy. He was described "as a good lecturer and speaker who popularized and could act out the behavior of insects when he talked about them, he had ... a gracious nature and was helpful and easy to connect with. He liked to talk about his tasks and experiences" and " his ... lessons and excursions are remembered as gems in teaching."

== Botflies ==
In 1916, Natvig was an expert in the reindeer grazing case (Norwegian: reinbeitesaken), and he traveled to Målselv Municipality to study the biology of the reindeer warble fly. The next summer he traveled to Nordland and Trøndelag counties, and this contributed to his later interest in blood-sucking insects. He later became involved with the occurrence and biology of the subfamily of botflies known as warble flies (the cattle warble fly, Hypoderma lineatum, and the ox warble fly, Hypoderma bovis) in Norway. He rebuffed the claim that girls working as shepherds in summer pastures were particularly susceptible to warble fly attacks because they were unclean and smelled like cows, fooling the warble flies. He proved that warble flies with mature eggs were so driven that they deposited the eggs on both humans and animals if they were nearby. Natvig worked deliberately, and it was not until 1937 that he produced an elaborate thesis, almost a full volume, on warble flies in Scandinavia.

== Mosquitoes ==
While working on botflies, Natvig's interest in mosquitoes was aroused. His contribution to the knowledge of Norwegian mosquitoes was required because the last published study was from 1877. Natvig himself collected a great deal of material during his travels in southern Norway, which encompassed over eighteen summers. He collected some material himself from Northern Norway, but was also sent a lot of material. He was also at the Institute of Maritime and Tropical Diseases (German: Institut für Schiff- und Tropenkrankheiten) in Hamburg on several occasions, where he studied the morphology and systematics of the mosquito. In 1949, he received his doctorate with a dissertation on the mosquito, titled Contribution to the Knowledge of the Danish and Fennoscandian Mosquitoes. Culicini. The dissertation is 589 pages long and covers mosquitoes throughout Scandinavia and Denmark. Natvig's examiner at his doctoral defense, Hjalmar Broch, is said to have stated "this is apparently evidence that a mosquito can turn into an elephant." With this, Natvig became one of the foremost experts on mosquitoes, and his dissertation became indispensable for anyone working with mosquitoes. Natvig also had a large amount of material on Anopheles mosquitoes, and he did some work on this genus of insects.

== Norwegian Entomological Society ==
Leif Reinhardt Natvig joined the Norwegian Entomological Society in 1912 at the age of 16. That same year he was elected a deputy member of the board, and he performed many duties and was very active in the society. He served as the society's secretary (1915–1918, 1930–1937) and chairman (1937–1950). He was a member of the editorial committee of the Norwegian Journal of Entomology (1924–1950) and its editor (1952–1955).

== Publications ==
Natvig published several major works and a number of shorter articles on his field of study, including several obituaries of entomologists. He wrote down much of Norway's early entomological history and helped preserve it. He contributed research publications in a number of professional journals. In addition to entomology, he also wrote a book on Japanese woodcuts.

- 1925: "J. J. Kieffer" (Obituary). Norsk Entomologisk Tidsskrift 2: 108.
- 1928: "Die norwegische Finnmarks-Ekspedition. Culicidae" (The Norwegian Finnmark Expedition. Culicidae). Norsk Entomologisk Tidsskrift 2: 241–349.
- 1930: "Teodor Odhner" (Obituary). Norsk Entomologisk Tidsskrift 2: 305–307.
- 1930: "Christopher Aurivillius" (Obituary). Norsk Entomologisk Tidsskrift 2: 307–308.
- 1930: "Ejnar Fischer" (Obituary). Norsk Entomologisk Tidsskrift 2: 308–309.
- 1930: "Culiciden der 2 'Fram'-Expedition (1898–1902)" (The Culicidae of the Second Fram Expedition, 1898–1902). Norsk Entomologisk Tidsskrift 2: 358–359.
- 1932: "Dr. Walther Horn 60 år" (Dr. Walther Horn, 60 Years). Norsk Entomologisk Tidsskrift 3: 3.
- 1932: "Professor dr. Hans Rebel 70 år" (Professor Hans Rebel, 70 Years). Norsk Entomologisk Tidsskrift 3: 4.
- 1932: "Om Myiasis samt to nye norske kasus" (Myiasis and Two New Norwegian Cases). Norsk Entomologisk Tidsskrift 3: 117–122.
- 1932: "En Porocephal som fakultativ parasitt hos norsk hvepsehøk" (A Porocephalus as a Non-Obligatory Parasite in Norwegian European Honey Buzzards). Norsk Entomologisk Tidsskrift 3: 123–128.
- 1934: "On Some Anomalities in Culicide Hypopygiae." Norsk Entomologisk Tidsskrift 3: 328–331.
- 1935: Japanske tresnitt. Kunstner- og folkeliv (Japanese Woodcuts: Artistic and Folk Life). Oslo: Gyldendal.
- 1941: "Crataerina pallida Latr., en for Norges fauna ny Hippoboscide" (Crataerina pallida Latr., A New Hippoboscid for Norway's Fauna). Norsk Entomologisk Tidsskrift 4: 38–40.
- 1944: "Entomologien ved Det Kongelige Frederiks Universitet. Et bidrag til norsk entornologis historie. 1. Tidsrommet 1813–1907" (Entomology at the Royal Frederick University. A Contribution to the History of Norwegian Entomology. 1. The Period from 1813 to 1907). Norsk Entomologisk Tidsskrift 7(1/2): 1–73.
- 1945: "Notes on Culex alpinus Linnaeus and Aëdes nigripes (Zett.)." Norsk Entomologisk Tidsskrift 7: 99–106.
- 1946: "Differential Characters of the Female Aëdes nigripes (Zett.) and A. nearcticus Dyar." Norsk Entomologisk Tidsskrift 7: 184–187.
- 1948: "Contribution to the Knowledge of the Danish and Fennoscandian Mosquitoes. Culicini." Norsk Entomologisk Tidsskrift Suppl. I: 1–567.
- 1953: "The type specimens of Aëdes nigripes (Zett.)." Norsk Entomologisk Tidsskrift 9: 86–92.
- 1960: "Oversikt over entomologien i Norge gjennom 200 år" (Overview of Entomology in Norway over Two Hundred Years). Fauna 13: 57–71.
