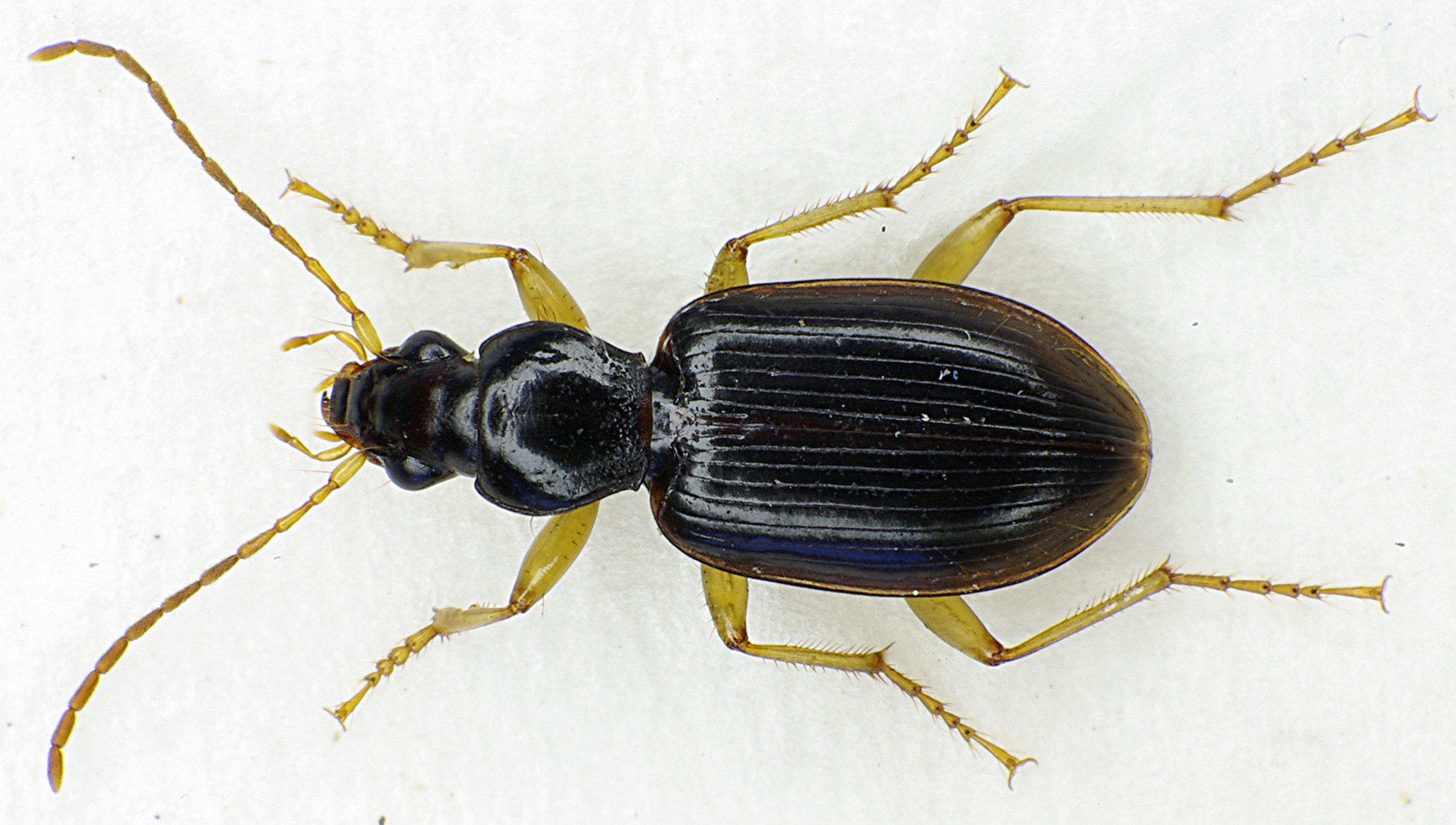
- Paranchus albipes

Scientific classification
- Domain: Eukaryota
- Kingdom: Animalia
- Phylum: Arthropoda
- Class: Insecta
- Order: Coleoptera
- Suborder: Adephaga
- Family: Carabidae
- Subfamily: Platyninae
- Tribe: Platynini
- Genus: Paranchus authority = Lindroth, 1974

= Paranchus =

Genus of beetles

Paranchus is a genus of ground beetle native to Europe, the Near East, the Nearctic and North Africa. The species of this genus are either black or brown coloured.

== Species ==
These four species belong to the genus Paranchus:

- Paranchus albipes (Fabricius, 1794) (worldwide)
- Paranchus debilis (Wollaston, 1864) (the Canary Islands)
- Paranchus euthemon (Andrewes, 1931) (Indonesia)
- Paranchus nichollsii (Wollaston, 1864) (the Canary Islands)
