= Wilhelm Maribo Schøyen =

Norwegian entomologist

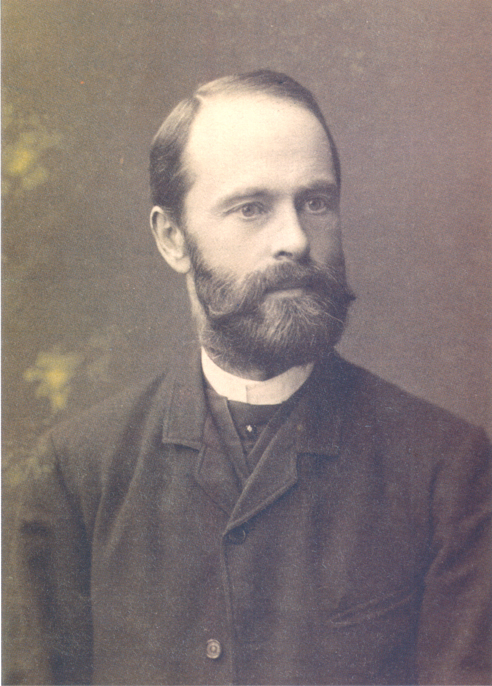
- Born: October 31, 1844; Grue, Norway
- Died: May 8, 1918 (aged 73); Oslo, Norway
- Occupation: Entomologist

Wilhelm Maribo Schøyen (October 21, 1844 – May 8, 1918) was a Norwegian entomologist. He was Norway's first government entomologist and became prominent through his writings. He was the father of the government entomologist Thor Hiorth Schøyen.

== Entomologist ==
Schøyen was born in Grue Municipality in Norway. He graduated from Ås Higher Agricultural School in 1867. He had also begun medical studies, but he did not finish because of health issues. From 1884 to 1891, Schøyen was a curator at the Oslo Zoological Museum, where he reviewed and systematized the museum's collection of lower animal groups. He started working as an agricultural entomologist in 1891. Every year he published a report on insect pests and plant diseases. These included reports from all over Norway, and also some about the biology of pests and how to fight them. In 1894, Schøyen became Norway's first government entomologist. He held this position until 1912. Schøyen was a member of the Norwegian Academy of Science and Letters. He was also present when the Norwegian Entomological Society was founded in 1904.

== Insect collector ==
During his travels in Norway, Schøyen focused on collecting butterflies. In 1893 he published Fortegnelse over Norges Lepidoptera (Inventory of Norway's Lepidoptera). In addition, he collected mushrooms and several other taxa of insects. These especially included agricultural pests, about which he wrote many popular science articles. His extensive insect collection is kept at the Oslo Zoological Museum today.

== Awards and recognitions ==
Wilhelm Maribo Schøyen was named a knight of the Order of St. Olav in 1915.

== Selected works ==
Schøyen authored more than 300 popular science and research publications. These include seven books, 70 research articles, 26 annual reports, and almost 200 popular science articles in magazines and journals. A complete list of Schøyen's works was compiled by Leif Reinhart Natvig. A list of his most important publications was published in the first issue of Norsk Entomologisk Tidsskrift in 1921 (dated 1920).

- 1867: "Nogle Ord om Hakkespetterne, Skogeierens tro og flittige Hjælpere" (Some Words about Woodpeckers: The Forest Owner's Faithful and Diligent Helpers), in Landmarks Tidsskrift for det praktiske Landbrug
- 1868: "Rognetræet" (The Rowan Tree), in Landmarks Tidsskrift for det praktiske Landbrug
- 1868: "Meldøieren" (The Ergots), in Landmarks Tidsskrift for det praktiske Landbrug
- 1870: "Potetessygen" (The Potato Disease), in Landmarks Tidsskrift for det praktiske Landbrug
- 1871: "Græsmarkerne" (Pastures), in Landmarks Tidsskrift for det praktiske Landbrug
- 1870–74: Minor contributions published in Norsk Folkeblad and Magazin for Naturkundskab
- 1875: De for Ager, Eng og Have skadeligste Insekter og Smaakryb (The Insects and Bugs Most Harmful to Fields, Meadows, and Gardens). Supplement to the magazine Folkevennen, published by the Society for the Promotion of Popular Education (Selskabet til Folkeoplysningens Fremme)
- 1875: "Fortegnelse over Sommerfugle fundne i Søndre Odalen" (Inventory of Butterflies Found in Sørndre Odalen), in Nyt Magazin for Naturvidenskaberne
- 1876: De i Husene skadeligste Insekter og Midder (The Most Harmful Insects and Mites in Houses), supplement to the magazine Folkevennen
- 1878: "Bidrag til Gudbrandsdalens og Dovrefjelds Insektfauna" (Contribution to the Insect Fauna of the Gudbrandsdalen and Dovrefjell), in Nyt Magazin for Naturvidenskaberne
- 1879: "Fortsat Bidrag til Gudbrandsdalens og Dovrefjelds Insektfauna" (Contribution to the Insect Fauna of the Gudbrandsdalen and Dovrefjell, Continued), in Nyt Magazin for Naturvidenskaberne
- 1879: "Supplement til H. Siebkes Enumeratio insectorum Norvegicorum Fasc. I og II" (Supplement to H. Siebke's Inventory of Norwegian Insects Fascicles 1 and 2), in Forhandlinger i Videnskabsselskabet i Christiania
- 1880: "Bemerkninger til H. Siebkes Enumeratio ins. Norv. Fasc. V. Pars I" (Comments on H. Siebke's Inventory of Norwegian Insects Fascicle 5, Part 1), in Forhandlinger i Videnskabsselskabet i Christiania.
- 1880: "Efterskrift til Wallengren 'Forsök att bestämma en del utaf H. Ström beskrifna Norska Insekter'" (Postscript to Wallengren's Attempt to Identify Some Norwegian Insects Described by H. Ström), in Forhandlinger i Videnskabsselskabet i Christiania
- 1880: "Lepidopterologiske Bidrag til Norges Fauna" (Lepidopterological Contributions to Norwegian Fauna), in Nyt Magazin for Naturvidenskab
- 1880: "Oversigt over de i Norges arktiske Region hidtil fundne Lepidoptera" (Overview of Lepidoptera found in Norway's Arctic Region to Date), in Arkiv for Mathematik og Naturvidenskab
- 1880: "Om Furuspinderens (Eutrichia pini) Optræden i Norge i Aarene 1812–16" (On the Occurrence of the Pine-Tree Lappet (Eutrichia pini) in Norway in the Years 1812–16) and Coleopterologiske Notitser (Coleopterological Notes), in Entomologisk Tidsskrift (Stockholm)
- 1881: "Lepidopterologiske Undersøgelser i Romsdals amt sommeren 1880" (Lepidopterological Investigations in Romsdal County in the Summer of 1880), in Nyt Magazin for Naturvidenskab
- 1881: "Om nogle for Norges og tildels ogsaa for Skandinaviens Fauna nye Lepidoptera" (Some New Lepidoptera for Norway's and Partly Also Scandinavia's Fauna), in Forhandlinger i Videnskabs-selskabet i Christiania
- 1881: "Ueber einige neue Schmetterlings-Varietäten aus dem arktischen Norwegen" (Some New Butterfly Varieties from Arctic Norway), in Entomologisk Tidsskrift (Stockholm)
- 1882: "Nye Bidrag til Kundskaben om det arktiske Norges Lepidopterfauna" (New Contributions to the Knowledge of Arctic Norway's Lepidoptera Fauna), in Tromsø museums aarshefter 4 and 5
- 1882: "Bemerkninger om Lycaena argus-aegon-Gruppen" (Comments on the Lycaena argus/aegon Group), in Entomologisk Tidsskrift (Stockholm)
- 1884: "Om Forekomsten av Insekter i Menneskets Legeme" (The Occurrence of Insects in the Human Body), in Naturen
- 1884: "Om Micropteryx-Larvernes Optræden i vore Birkeskove" (The Occurrence of Micropterix Larvae in Our Birch Forests), in Entomologisk Tidsskrift (Stockholm)
- 1884 "Tilvæxt til Norges Lepidopterfauna fra de senere aar" (Growth in Norway's Lepidoptera Fauna in Recent Years), in Entomologisk Tidsskrift (Stockholm)
- 1884: "Nogle Exempler paa Insekters Masseoptræden i de sidste Par Aar" (Some Examples of Mass Occurrences of Insects in the Last Few Years), in Entomologisk Tidsskrift (Stockholm)
- 1885: "Bemaerkninger om enkelte Variationer af vore Rhopalocerer" (Notes on Some Variations of our Rhopalocera), in Entomologisk Tidsskrift (Stockholm)
- 1885: "Tillæg og Berigtigelser til Norges Lepidopterfauna" (Additions and Corrections to Norway's Lepidoptera Fauna), in Forhandlinger i Videnskabs-selskabet i Christiania
- 1885: "Bygaalen (Tylenchus Hordei n. sp.) en ny for Bygget skadelig Planteparasit blandt Rundormene" (Tylenchus hordei n. sp., A New Nematode Plant Parasite Harmful to Barley), in Forhandlinger i Videnskabs-selskabet i Christiania
- 1886: "Om Forekomsten af Dipterlarver under Huden hos Mennesker" (The Presence of Diptera Larvae under Human Skin), in Entomologisk Tidsskrift (Stockholm)
- 1887: "Analytisk Oversigt over de skandinaviske Slægter af phytophage Hymenoptera" (An Analytical Overview of the Scandinavian Species of Plant-Eating Hymenoptera), in Entomologisk Tidsskrift (Stockholm)
- 1887: "Yderligere Tillæg til Norges Lepidopterfauna" (A Further Supplement to Norway's Lepidoptera Fauna), in Forhandlinger i Videnskabs-selskabet i Christiania
- 1887: "Supplement til H. Siebkes Enum. Ins. Norv. Fasc. V. Pars I" (Supplement to H. Siebke's Inventory of Norwegian Insects Fascicle 5, Part 1), in Forhandlinger i Videnskabs-selskabet i Christiania
- 1887: "Fortegnelse over de i Norge hidtil fundne Neuroptera planipennia og Pseudo-Neuroptera" (A List of Neuroptera-Planipennia and Pseudo-Neuroptera found in Norway So Far), in Forhandlinger i Videnskabs-selskabet i Christiania
- 1888: "Norsk entomologisk Litteratur" (Norwegian Entomological Literature), in Entomologisk Tidsskrift (Stockholm), continued annually until 1896.
- 1889: "Bidrag til Kundskaben om Norges Orthopter- og Hemipterfaunae" (Contribution to the Knowledge of Norway's Orthoptera and Hemiptera Fauna), in Forhandlinger i Videnskabs-selskabet i Christiania
- 1889: "Supplement til H. Siebke's Enum. Insect. Norv. Fasc. IV" (Supplement to H. Siebke's Inventory of Norwegian Insects Fascicle 4), in Forhandlinger i Videnskabs-selskabet i Christiania
- 1890: "Notes on Dr. Jordan's Entomological Ramble at Bergen," in Entomologist's Monthly Magazine (London)
- 1890: "Nye Bidrag til Norges Lepidopterfauna" (New Contributions to Norway's Lepidoptera Fauna), in Entomologisk Tidsskrift (Stockholm)
- 1890: "Om skadellg Optræden paa Bygagrene av den mørke Aadselbille (Silpha opaca L.)" (The Harmful Occurrence of the Dark Carrion Beetle (Silpha opaca L.) in Barley Fields), in Norsk Landmandsblad
- 1890: "Om Brandsygdomme paa Kornagrene" (Smut Diseases in Grain Fields), in Norsk Landmandsblad
- 1890: "Menneskets vigtigste Indvoldsorme og deres Udviklingshistorie" (The Most Important Intestinal Worms in Humans and Their Development History), supplement to the magazine Folkevennen
- 1891: "Om Fjeldbirkemaaleren (Cidaria dilutata S. V.)" (The November Moth, Cidaria dilutata S. V.), in Den norske Turistforenings Aarbog
- 1893: "Fortegnelse over Norges Lepidoptera" (List of Norway's Lepidoptera), in Forhandlinger i Videnskabs-selskabet i Christiania
- 1894: "Om Anvendelsen af insekt- og sopfordrivende Midler i Havebruget" (The Use of Insecticides and Fungicides in Horticulture), in Norsk Havetidende, later published separately in multiple editions
- 1894–1912: Annual reports and announcements as government entomologist
- 1896: "En Cossus-Larves Forekomst i Maven hos et Menneske" (Occurrence of a Cossus Larva in the Stomach of a Human), in Norsk Magazin for Lægevidenskab
- 1913: Zoologi for Landbruksskolen (Zoology for the Agricultural School; Kristiania: Aschehoug & Co.)
- 1914: "Insekt og sopskade paa gran- og furukongler" (Insect and Fungal Damage to Spruce and Pine Cones), in Tidsskrift for skovbrug
- 1914: "Skadeinsekter i frø- og plantesenger" (Harmful Insects in Seed and Plant Beds), in Tidsskrift for skovbrug
- 1914: "Eplesugere og bladtæger paa epletrær" (Apple Psyllids and Capsid Bugs on Apple Trees), in Ukeskrift for Landbruk
