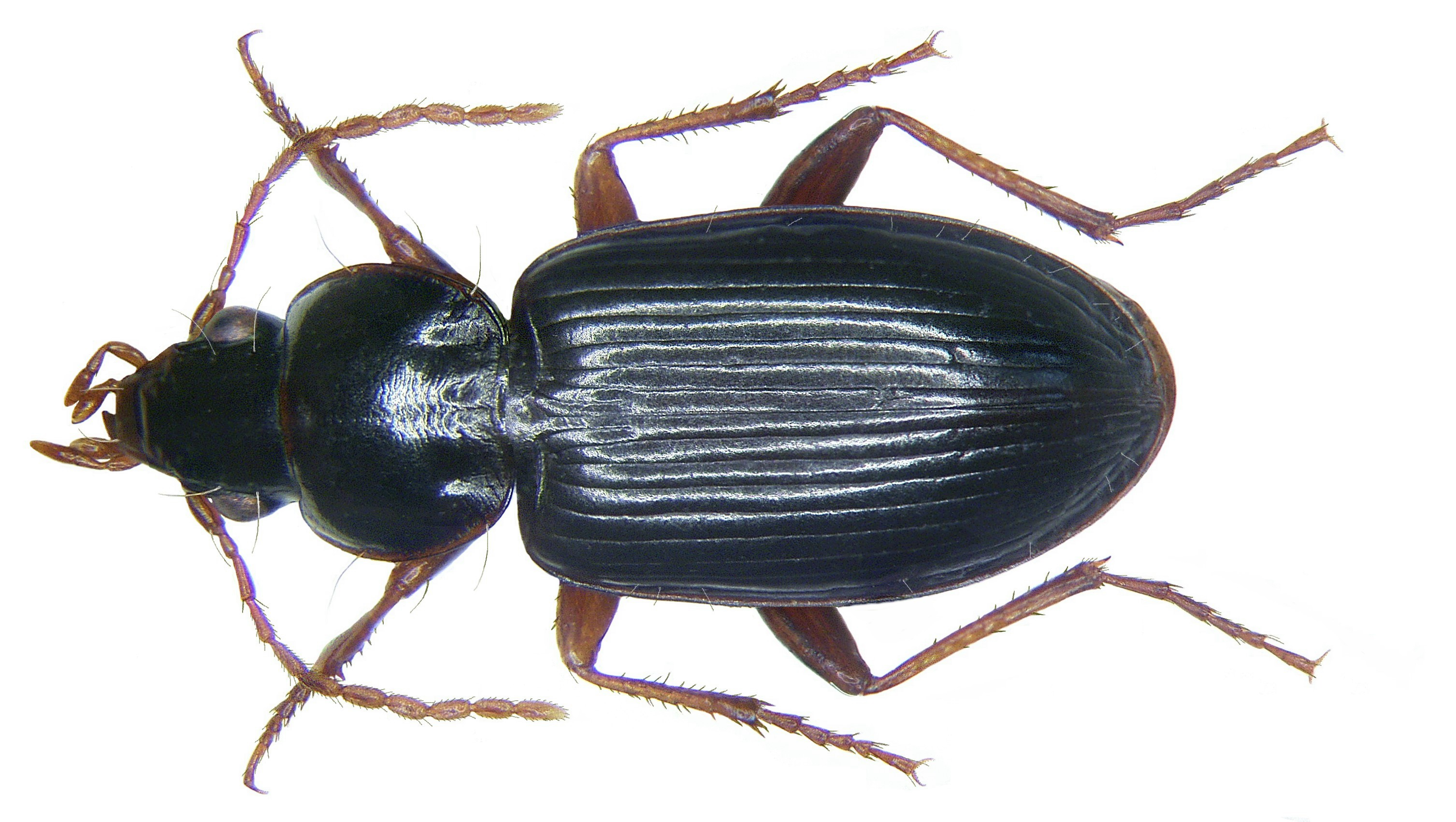

Scientific classification
- Kingdom: Animalia
- Phylum: Arthropoda
- Clade: Pancrustacea
- Class: Insecta
- Order: Coleoptera
- Suborder: Adephaga
- Family: Carabidae
- Genus: Synuchus
- Species: S. vivalis

Binomial name
- Synuchus vivalis Illiger, 1798

= Synuchus vivalis =

Species of beetle

Synuchus vivalis is a species of ground beetle in the subfamily Harpalinae. It was described by Illiger in 1798.
