= Synuchus fulvus =

Scientific classification
- Kingdom: Animalia
- Phylum: Arthropoda
- Class: Insecta
- Order: Coleoptera
- Suborder: Adephaga
- Family: Carabidae
- Genus: Synuchus
- Species: S. fulvus

Binomial name
- Synuchus fulvus Habu, 1978

Species of beetle

Synuchus fulvus is a species of ground beetle in the subfamily Harpalinae. It was described by Habu in 1978.
