= Synuchus robustus =

Scientific classification
- Kingdom: Animalia
- Phylum: Arthropoda
- Class: Insecta
- Order: Coleoptera
- Suborder: Adephaga
- Family: Carabidae
- Genus: Synuchus
- Species: S. robustus

Binomial name
- Synuchus robustus Habu, 1978

Species of beetle

Synuchus robustus is a species of ground beetle in the subfamily Harpalinae. It was described by Habu in 1978.
