= Synuchus congruus =

Scientific classification
- Kingdom: Animalia
- Phylum: Arthropoda
- Class: Insecta
- Order: Coleoptera
- Suborder: Adephaga
- Family: Carabidae
- Genus: Synuchus
- Species: S. congruus

Binomial name
- Synuchus congruus (A. Morawitz, 1862)

Species of beetle

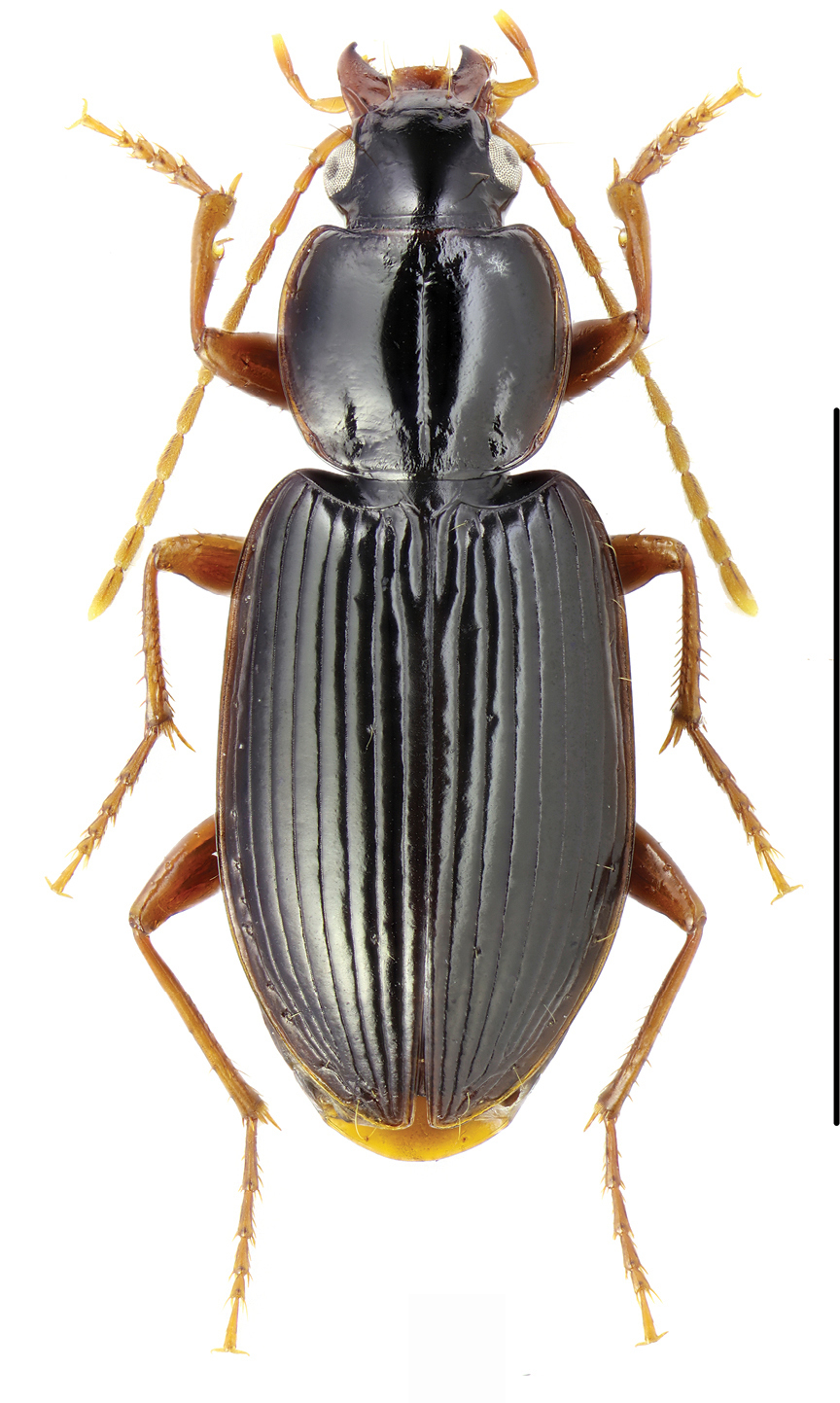
Synuchus congruus

Synuchus congruus is a species of ground beetle in the subfamily Harpalinae. It was described by A. Morawitz in 1862.
