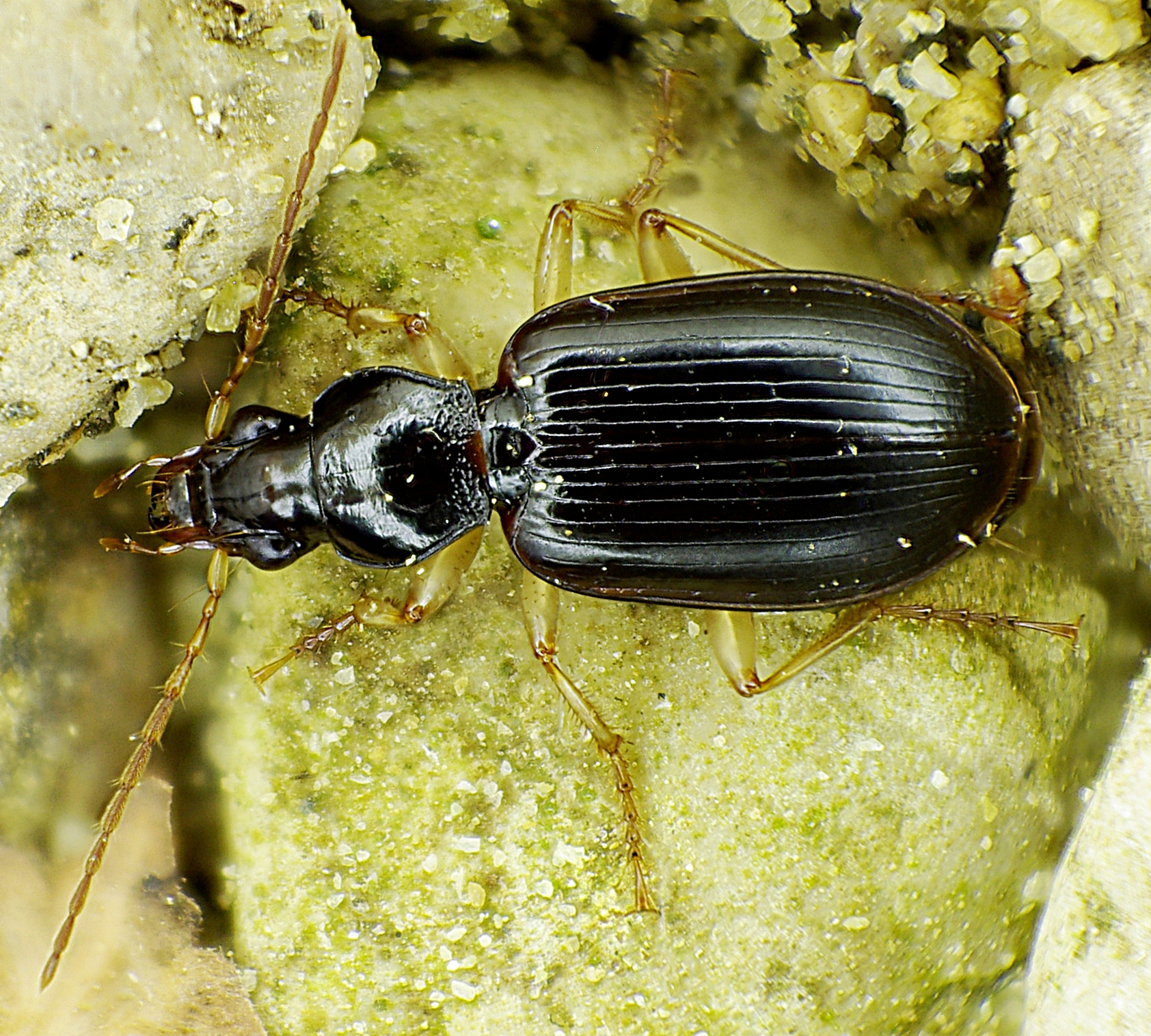

Scientific classification
- Kingdom: Animalia
- Phylum: Arthropoda
- Clade: Pancrustacea
- Class: Insecta
- Order: Coleoptera
- Suborder: Adephaga
- Family: Carabidae
- Genus: Paranchus
- Species: P. albipes

Binomial name
- Paranchus albipes (Fabricius, 1796)

Synonyms
- Agonum albipes Fabricius, 1796

= Paranchus albipes =

Species of beetle

Paranchus albipes is a species of ground beetles in the family Carabidae.

== Distribution ==
The species live near water in countries like: U.K, and continents like Europe, Asia, and North Africa.

Gallery
Fig. 1: Head from the front	Fig. 2: Head from the side
Fig. 3: Top view and side view	Fig. 4: Underside
Fig. 5: Head from below, partially coloured on the right; red: antennae; blue: jaw palpate; green: lip button; pink: pair of bristles on the penultimate limb of the lip probe
Fig. 6: Middle breast from obliquely below, partially coloured on the right; ochre: folded part of the wing coverts; orange: boundary of the midhip cavity; yellow: hip; pink: trochanter; blue:thigh; green: Epimer of the middle breast
