= Synuchus dubius =

Scientific classification
- Domain: Eukaryota
- Kingdom: Animalia
- Phylum: Arthropoda
- Class: Insecta
- Order: Coleoptera
- Suborder: Adephaga
- Family: Carabidae
- Subfamily: Harpalinae
- Genus: Synuchus
- Species: S. dubius

Binomial name
- Synuchus dubius (LeConte, 1854)

Species of beetle

Synuchus dubius is a species of ground beetle in the subfamily Harpalinae. It was described by John Lawrence LeConte in 1854.
