= Arne Semb-Johansson =

Norwegian zoologist (1919–2001)

- Born: 20 September 1919; Kristiania, Norway
- Died: 22 February 2001 (aged 81)
- Occupation: Zoologist
- Employer: University of Oslo
- Awards: Order of St. Olav (1987)

Arne Semb-Johansson (20 September 1919 – 22 February 2001) was a Norwegian zoologist. He was born in Kristiania. He chaired the Norwegian Entomological Society from 1950 to 1953. He was assigned as a professor of zoology at the University of Oslo from 1959. Among his early works were studies of the nervous system and endocrine system of insects. He edited the six volume encyclopedia Cappelens Dyreleksikon, published 1979–1981. He was decorated Knight, First Class of the Order of St. Olav in 1987.

During the occupation of Norway by Nazi Germany he was a central member of Milorg, being a courier for leader Jens Christian Hauge. He was a member of the board of Norway's Resistance Museum from 1973. In 1995, he published the book Fem år for fred og frihet med Milorg 1940–1945.
