= Synuchus nanpingensis =

Scientific classification
- Domain: Eukaryota
- Kingdom: Animalia
- Phylum: Arthropoda
- Class: Insecta
- Order: Coleoptera
- Suborder: Adephaga
- Family: Carabidae
- Subfamily: Harpalinae
- Genus: Synuchus
- Species: S. nanpingensis

Binomial name
- Synuchus nanpingensis Kirschenhofer, 1997

Species of beetle

Synuchus nanpingensis is a species of ground beetle in the subfamily Harpalinae. It was described by Kirschenhofer in 1997.
