= Thor Hiorth Schøyen =

Norwegian entomologist (1885–1961)

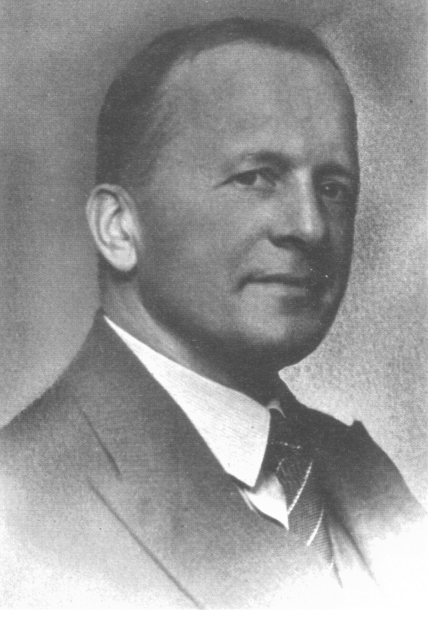
- Born: May 1, 1885; Aker, Norway
- Died: June 6, 1961 (aged 76); Oslo, Norway
- Occupation: Entomologist

Thor Hiorth Schøyen (May 1, 1885 – June 6, 1961) was a Norwegian entomologist.

He became the curator of the Oslo Zoological Museum in 1908. Later, in 1913, he became the government entomologist at the Norwegian Plant Protection Office (Statens plantevern), a position that he held for 42 years. Schøyen taught at the Norwegian College of Agriculture from 1910 to 1950. He was also a central figure in the Norwegian Entomological Society. He received the King's Medal of Merit in gold in recognition of his work.

Thor Hiorth Schøyen became interested in nature and insects at an early age, and he studied zoology at the University of Oslo. He was described as "... a quiet man, gracious and helpful, without prejudice. He had diverse interests and was a gentleman throughout his journey." He was the son of the entomologist Wilhelm Maribo Schøyen.

== Zoological Museum ==
Thor Hiorth Schøyen became the first curator of the Oslo Zoological Museum in 1908. He was involved in moving the insect collection to the new building in Tøyen. He also put part of the collection on display.

Schøyen served as the secretary of the fourth Nordic entomology conference in 1933.

=== Government entomologist ===
Following in his father's footsteps, in 1913 Thor Hiorth Schøyen assumed the position of Norway's government entomologist. In the first years, mycology was also included in this position, but in 1919 a separate position was created for a government mycologist, filled by Ivar Jørstad. Schøyen worked in an office with no assistants, and he responded to hundreds of pest and fungal disease requests annually. He also made many business trips in Norway. It was not until 1939 that he received a research assistant. He became head of the zoological department of the Norwegian Plant Protection Office in 1942 and the administrative head of the entire institute in 1955. After the Second World War, Schøyen was involved in monitoring the spread of the Colorado potato beetle. Altogether he served as the government entomologist for 42 years. As the government entomologist, he especially worked on issues related to insect pests.

== Norwegian Entomological Association ==
Schøyen was a central figure in the Norsk Norwegian Entomological Society. He became a member of the association in 1905, a year after it was established. He was the director of the association from 1921 to 1932. Schøyen was the editor of Norsk Entomologisk Tidsskrift (now the Norwegian Journal of Entomology) from 1933 to 1952.

== Awards and recognitions ==
In 1935, Schøyen was named a corresponding member of the Finnish Entomological Association (Finnish: Suomen Hyönteistieteellinen Seura) in Helsinki. In 1956 he was honored with the King's Medal of Merit in gold. He was named an honorary member of the Norwegian Garden Society in 1958.

== Author ==
Thor Hiorth Schøyen authored a number of publications, many of which were popular science articles about pests in agriculture and forestry. As the government entomologist, he published much research relating to his field of study. The most significant are his reports, which he compiled every two to three years. These contained much information about insects in Norway, including discoveries of new species and interesting biological observations.
