= Lauritz Sømme =

Norwegian entomologist

- Born: March 7, 1931 (age 94)
- Occupation: Entomologist
- Spouse: Randi Sømme
- Parents: Iacob Dybwad Sømme (father); Aslaug Sverdrup Sømme (mother)

Lauritz Sverdrup Sømme (born March 7, 1931) is a Norwegian entomologist. His work has focused on insects in houses and stored foods, and especially the wintering and cold tolerance of certain arthropods. Sømme has been on several expeditions to the Antarctic, participated in field trips to Svalbard, and visited various other extreme places on Earth in his research on arthropods and cold tolerance.

Sømme was the editor of the Norwegian Journal of Entomology from 1966 to 1978 and he has published several books. He is an honorary member of the Norwegian Entomological Society. Since 2011, Sømme has been responsible for invertebrates in the Great Norwegian Encyclopedia.

Sømme taught entomology at University of Oslo, from introductory courses upwards. Part of his teaching took place at the field station at Finse and in Ny-Ålesund. Sømme retired in 1998. He is a member of the Norwegian Academy of Science and Letters.

He was formerly married to the biochemist Randi Sømme.

== Research ==
Sømme received his candidatus realium degree from the University of Oslo in 1958 with a thesis on insecticide resistance (DDT) in houseflies (Musca domestica). Sømme found that there were not many houseflies in Norwegian barns. However, there were many other species of flies, such as cluster flies (Pollenia sp.) and blood-sucking parasitic stable flies (Stomoxys calcitrans), a biting fly related to the tsetse fly. Both of these and the houseflies were resistant to DDT.

After completing his degree, Sømme began working as a fellow at the Norwegian Plant Protection Office (Statens plantevern) in Ås. He remained there for 12 years, working especially with insects in houses and stored food, and insect resistance to insecticide.

In 1962, Sømme spent a year in Canada studying cold tolerance in insects at the Canada Agriculture Research Station in Lethbridge, Alberta. Sømme's 1967 dissertation was on cold tolerance in insects.

In 1970, Sømme changed his workplace from the Plant Protection Office to the University of Oslo, where he became a lecturer in entomology. Later, in 1985, he was appointed a professor of the subject. He continued his studies on the cold tolerance of beetles, springtails, and mites. Especially useful for him was the recently established research station at Finse. Cold tolerance was studied in mites and springtails on windblown and snowless ridges in the high mountains. It was determined that the leaf beetle Chrysomela collaris has a supercooling point (minimum lethal temperature) at −40 °C (−40 °F) before the body fluid freezes and the animal dies. At Finse, it was also discovered that the ground beetle Pelophila borealis can be completely frozen in ice over an extended period. The beetle's supercooling point is just −5 °C (23 °F), but this is probably enough because it winters under snow, which insulates it. The places it overwinters are sometimes damp and wet, and the beetle may risk freezing completely in ice. It was observed that it can survive in an environment without fresh oxygen (anoxia).

Since 1977, Sømme has participated in several research expeditions to the Antarctic, where he studied arthropods (mites and springtails) on Bouvet Island and in Queen Maud Land. The fauna there have the same survival mechanisms as Sømme had found earlier in Norway's high mountains at Finse. On Bouvet Island, there are eight to ten species of mites and springtails. The island lies 2,000 kilometers (1,200 mi) from the nearest continent. It lies east of the South Shetland Islands, and the wind in the area is often from the west. It is therefore natural to assume that both the flora and fauna on the island were brought by birds crossing the sea.

In the Antarctic only a few species of flies have been found in addition to springtails and mites. There are some small chironomids that live in favorable locations along the coast. The largest strictly terrestrial animal (if seals and birds are not considered terrestrial animals) is a springtail about 2 millimeters (0.079 in) long. Sømme also participated in expeditions to South Georgia Island and Signy Island.

In the Andes, Sømme found a grasshopper that was able to tolerate the large temperature fluctuation between day and night. During the night, the temperature was −5 °C (23 °F) and the insect froze. In the morning, it thawed out and lived normally. The daytime temperature could be over 20 °C (68 °F).

Lauritz Sømme has made shorter trips to several places in the world to study arthropods' cold tolerance, including the Atlas Mountains and Mount Kenya in Africa. He has also spent time on Svalbard since 1988, where he helped determine that some animals can become desiccated in the fall. When the cold weather comes, they have so little water in their bodies that they survive until the spring without frost damage, and then in the spring the body's fluid content increases again. This strategy is used by some potworms and the Arctic springtail Onychiurus arcticus.

== Author ==
Lauritz Sømme has translated several books and much research literature into Norwegian. He has written several books and many shorter articles about his subject area in Norwegian. As a researcher, he has contributed publications to a number of journals. Somme served as the editor of the journal Norwegian Journal of Entomology for several years and contributed articles to it.

His bibliography of research publications includes 143 articles published between 1958 and May 2007. He has written 94 popular science articles. Sømme has also authored many short articles and reports.

=== Books ===
- 1969: Sømme. L. Pesticider, mat og natur (Pesticides, Food, and Nature). Oslo: Landbruksforlaget.
- 1983: Sømme, L. Sommer i Antarktis. Blant sel, pingviner og hvalfangstminner (Summer in Antarctica. Among Seals, Penguins and Whaling Memories). Oslo: Universitetsforlaget.
- 1987: Sømme, L. Insektenes suksess. En vellykket dyregruppe og dens tilpasning til miljøet (Insect Success. A Successful Animal Group and Its Adaptation to the Environment). Oslo: Universitetsforlaget.
- 1988: Sømme, L., & Kalas, S. Das Pinguin-Kinder-Buch (The Children's Book of Penguins). Salzburg: Neugebauer Press.
- 1988: Sømme, L., & Kalas, S. The Penguin Family Book. (translated from German). London: Neugebauer Press.
- 1988: Sømme, L., & Kalas, S. Pingvinbogen (The Penguin Book; translated from German). Copenhagen: Centrum.
- 1988: Sømme, L., & Kalas, S. Pingvinungar (Penguin Babies; translated from German). Stockholm: Rabén & Sjögren.
- 1988: Sømme, L. Virvelløse dyr på land og i ferskvann (Land and Freshwater Invertebrates). Oslo: NKS-Forlaget.
- 1990: Sømme, L., & Kalas, S. Pingvinfamilien. (The Penguin Family; translated from German). Oslo: Cappelen.
- 1991: Sømme, L., & Kalas, S. V dezeli pingvinov. (In the Land of Penguins; translated from German). Ljubljana: Državna založba Slovenije.
- 1996: Sømme, L. Invertebrates in Hot and Cold Environments. Berlin: Springer-Verlag.
- 1997: Sømme, L., & Østbye, E. (ed). Finse – et senter for høyfjellsforskning (Finse: A Center for High Mountain Research). Finse: Høyfjellsøkologisk forskningsstasjon.
- 1998: Sømme, L. Insekter og andre virvelløse dyr. På land og i ferskvann (Insects and other Invertebrates. On Land and in Fresh Water). Oslo: NKS-Forlaget.
- 1999: Sømme, L. Hvirvelløse dyr (Invertebrates; translated from Norwegian by Ole Rasmussen). Copenhagen: Gads Forlag.
- 2000: Goodpasture, C., & Sømme, L. Blomster og bier (Flowers and Bees). Oslo: N.W. Damm.
- 2000: Goodpasture, C., & Sømme, L. Edderkoppenes hemmelige liv (The Secret Life of Spiders). Oslo: N.W. Damm.
- 2004: Sømme, L. Entomologiens historie i Norge. Norsk entomologisk forening 1904–2004 (The History of Entomology in Norway. The Norwegian Entomological Society 1904–2004). Oslo: Norwegian Entomological Society, Oslo Zoological Museum, University of Oslo.

=== Translated books ===
- 2001: McGavin, G. C. Insekter (Original: Insects: Spiders and Other Terrestrial Arthropods). Norwegian edition by Lauritz Sømme. Oslo: N.W. Damm.
- 2002: Byatt, A., Fothergill, A. & Holmes, M. Den blå planeten (Original: The Blue Planet: Seas of Life). Norwegian edition by Lauritz Sømme. Oslo: N.W. Damm.
- 2003: Lokki, J. (ed.) Dyr i verdens natur. Bind 5. Virvelløse dyr (Animals in the Natural World. Volume 5. Invertebrates). Adapted for the Norwegian market by Lauritz Sømme. Vestby: Bertmark Norge.
- 2004: Olsen, L.-H. & Sunesen, J. Små dyr i hus og hage (Small Creatures in the Home and Garden). Adapted for the Norwegian market by Lauritz Sømme. Oslo: N.W. Damm.

== Awards and distinctions ==
Sømme received the Fram Committee Nansen Award in 1992 for his work in polar areas.

Sømme joined the Norwegian Entomological Society in 1955, and he served on its board for several terms. In 2006, the board of the Norwegian Entomological Society unanimously recommended that Sømme be appointed an honorary member of the association, which took place at the society's annual meeting on February 13, 2007. He received honorary membership not for his professional career as an entomologist, but for his efforts on behalf of the society with the Norwegian Journal of Entomology, for which he served as editor from 1966 to 1978, and again from 1999 to 2007. Not least of all, he also wrote a history of Norwegian entomology and published it in a 326-page book when the Norwegian Entomological Society celebrated its centenary in 2004.
