= Synuchus satoi =

Scientific classification
- Domain: Eukaryota
- Kingdom: Animalia
- Phylum: Arthropoda
- Class: Insecta
- Order: Coleoptera
- Suborder: Adephaga
- Family: Carabidae
- Subfamily: Harpalinae
- Genus: Synuchus
- Species: S. satoi

Binomial name
- Synuchus satoi Morita & Toyoda, 2003

Species of beetle

Synuchus satoi is a species of ground beetle in the subfamily Harpalinae. It was described by Morita & Toyoda in 2003 and can be found in Japan.
