= Synuchus ishigakiensis =

Scientific classification
- Domain: Eukaryota
- Kingdom: Animalia
- Phylum: Arthropoda
- Class: Insecta
- Order: Coleoptera
- Suborder: Adephaga
- Family: Carabidae
- Subfamily: Harpalinae
- Genus: Synuchus
- Species: S. ishigakiensis

Binomial name
- Synuchus ishigakiensis Morita & Toyoda, 2003

Species of beetle

Synuchus ishigakiensis is a species of ground beetle in the subfamily Harpalinae. It was described by Morita & Toyoda in 2003.
