= Synuchus rjabuchini =

Scientific classification
- Domain: Eukaryota
- Kingdom: Animalia
- Phylum: Arthropoda
- Class: Insecta
- Order: Coleoptera
- Suborder: Adephaga
- Superfamily: Caraboidea
- Family: Carabidae
- Subfamily: Harpalinae
- Genus: Synuchus
- Species: S. rjabuchini

Binomial name
- Synuchus rjabuchini Lafer, 1989

Synonyms
- Synuchus rjabuchinii Lafer, 1989

Species of beetle

Synuchus rjabuchini is a species in the beetle family Carabidae. It is found in Russia.
