= Synuchus atricolor =

Scientific classification
- Domain: Eukaryota
- Kingdom: Animalia
- Phylum: Arthropoda
- Class: Insecta
- Order: Coleoptera
- Suborder: Adephaga
- Family: Carabidae
- Subfamily: Harpalinae
- Genus: Synuchus
- Species: S. atricolor

Binomial name
- Synuchus atricolor Bates, 1883

Species of beetle

Synuchus atricolor is a species of ground beetle in the subfamily Harpalinae. It was described by Henry Walter Bates in 1883.
