= Synuchus tanzawanus =

Scientific classification
- Kingdom: Animalia
- Phylum: Arthropoda
- Class: Insecta
- Order: Coleoptera
- Suborder: Adephaga
- Family: Carabidae
- Genus: Synuchus
- Species: S. tanzawanus

Binomial name
- Synuchus tanzawanus Habu, 1955

Species of beetle

Synuchus tanzawanus is a species of ground beetle in the subfamily Harpalinae. It was described by Habu in 1955.
