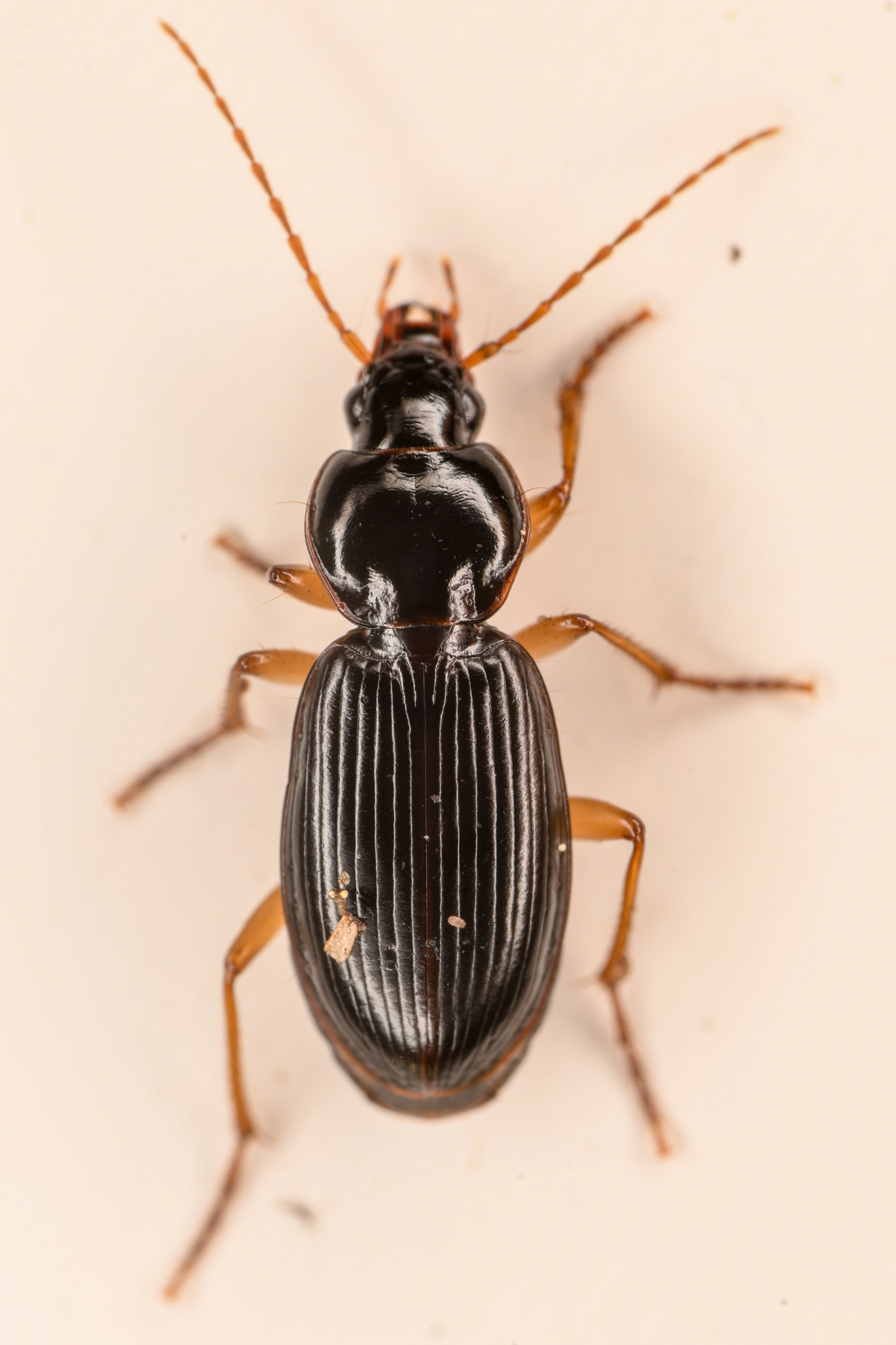
- Synuchus impunctatus, British Columbia, Canada

Scientific classification
- Kingdom: Animalia
- Phylum: Arthropoda
- Class: Insecta
- Order: Coleoptera
- Suborder: Adephaga
- Superfamily: Caraboidea
- Family: Carabidae
- Subfamily: Harpalinae
- Genus: Synuchus; Gyllenhal, 1810

= Synuchus =

Genus of beetles

Synuchus is a genus in the beetle family Carabidae. There are more than 80 described species in Synuchus.

== Species ==
These 86 species belong to the genus Synuchus:

- Synuchus adelosia (Andrewes, 1934) (India)
- Synuchus agonoides (Bates, 1889) (China)
- Synuchus agonus (Tschitscherine, 1895) (China, North Korea, South Korea, Japan, and Russia)
- Synuchus amamioshimae Habu, 1978 (Japan)
- Synuchus andrewesi Habu, 1955 (India)
- Synuchus angusticeps Tanaka, 1962 (Japan)
- Synuchus angustus Habu, 1978 (Taiwan)
- Synuchus arcuaticollis (Motschulsky, 1861) (China, Japan, and Russia)
- Synuchus assamensis Deuve, 1986 (Nepal and India)
- Synuchus atricolor (Bates, 1883) (North Korea, South Korea, and Japan)
- Synuchus bellus Habu, 1978 (Taiwan)
- Synuchus brevis Lindroth, 1956 (China)
- Synuchus breviusculus (Mannerheim, 1849) (Russia)
- Synuchus calathinus Lindroth, 1956 (China)
- Synuchus callitheres (Bates, 1873) (Japan)
- Synuchus cathaicus (Bates, 1873) (China)
- Synuchus chabo (Habu, 1955) (South Korea and Japan)
- Synuchus chinensis Lindroth, 1956 (China)
- Synuchus congruus (A.Morawitz, 1862) (China, South Korea, Japan, and Russia)
- Synuchus coreanus Kirschenhofer, 1990 (North Korea)
- Synuchus crocatus (Bates, 1883) (North Korea, South Korea, Japan, and Russia)
- Synuchus cycloderus (Bates, 1873) (China, North Korea, South Korea, and Japan)
- Synuchus dubius (LeConte, 1854) (United States)
- Synuchus dulcigradus (Bates, 1873) (Japan)
- Synuchus elburzensis Morvan, 1977 (Iran)
- Synuchus formosanus Lindroth, 1956 (Taiwan)
- Synuchus fukuharai (Habu, 1955) (Japan)
- Synuchus fulvus Habu, 1978 (Japan)
- Synuchus gigas Keyimu & Deuve, 1998 (China)
- Synuchus gravidus Lindroth, 1956 (China)
- Synuchus hikosanus (Habu, 1955) (Japan)
- Synuchus himalayicus (Jedlicka, 1935) (Pakistan and India)
- Synuchus hummeli (Jedlicka, 1935) (China)
- Synuchus impunctatus (Say, 1823) (United States and Canada)
- Synuchus inadai Morita & Arai, 2003 (Japan)
- Synuchus intermedius Lindroth, 1956 (China, North Korea, and Russia)
- Synuchus ishigakiensis Morita & Toyoda, 2003 (Japan)
- Synuchus jengi Morita, 2015 (Taiwan)
- Synuchus keinigus Morvan, 1994 (Nepal)
- Synuchus laticollis Lindroth, 1956 (Taiwan)
- Synuchus limbalis Lindroth, 1956 (China)
- Synuchus longipes Lindroth, 1956 (Japan)
- Synuchus longissimus Habu, 1978 (Taiwan)
- Synuchus macer Habu, 1978 (Taiwan)
- Synuchus major Lindroth, 1956 (China)
- Synuchus masumotoi Morita, 2010 (Taiwan)
- Synuchus melantho (Bates, 1883) (China, North Korea, South Korea, Japan, and Russia)
- Synuchus microtes Habu, 1978 (Taiwan)
- Synuchus minimus Lindroth, 1956 (Taiwan)
- Synuchus montanus Lindroth, 1956 (Japan)
- Synuchus nanpingensis Kirschenhofer, 1997 (China)
- Synuchus narae Lindroth, 1956 (Japan)
- Synuchus nitidus (Motschulsky, 1862) (China, North Korea, South Korea, Japan, Taiwan, and Russia)
- Synuchus nordmanni (A.Morawitz, 1862) (China, Japan, and Russia)
- Synuchus orbicollis (A.Morawitz, 1862) (China, North Korea, South Korea, Japan, and Russia)
- Synuchus pallidulus Habu, 1978 (Taiwan)
- Synuchus pallipes (Andrewes, 1934) (India)
- Synuchus patroboides Lindroth, 1956 (Japan)
- Synuchus picicolor Lindroth, 1956 (Japan)
- Synuchus pinguiusculus Habu, 1978 (Taiwan)
- Synuchus pseudomorphus (Semenov, 1889) (China)
- Synuchus pulcher Habu, 1978 (Taiwan)
- Synuchus rectangulus Lindroth, 1956 (Taiwan)
- Synuchus rjabuchini Lafer, 1989 (Russia)
- Synuchus robustus Habu, 1978 (Taiwan)
- Synuchus rufofuscus (Jedlicka, 1940) (Taiwan)
- Synuchus rufulus Habu, 1978 (Taiwan)
- Synuchus satoi Morita & Toyoda, 2003 (Japan)
- Synuchus semirufus (Casey, 1913) (Mexico)
- Synuchus shibatai Habu, 1978 (Japan)
- Synuchus sichuanensis Kirschenhofer, 1997 (China)
- Synuchus sikkimensis (Andrewes, 1934) (India)
- Synuchus sinomeridionalis Keyimu & Deuve, 1998 (China)
- Synuchus sinuaticollis Habu, 1978 (Taiwan)
- Synuchus suensoni Lindroth, 1956 (China)
- Synuchus taiwanus Habu, 1978 (Taiwan)
- Synuchus takeuchii (Habu, 1955) (Japan)
- Synuchus tanzawanus (Habu, 1955) (Japan)
- Synuchus testaceus (Jedlicka, 1940) (Taiwan)
- Synuchus tokararum Lindroth, 1956 (Japan)
- Synuchus truncatus Habu, 1978 (Taiwan)
- Synuchus uedai Morita, 2015 (Japan)
- Synuchus ventricosus Lindroth, 1956 (Japan)
- Synuchus vivalis (Illiger, 1798) (Palearctic)
- Synuchus yamashitai Morita, 2013 (Japan)
- Synuchus yasumatsui (Habu, 1955) (Japan)
