= Ragnhild Sundby =

Norwegian entomologist and professor (1922–2006)

Ragnhild Andrine Sundby (6 June 1922 – 29 November 2006) was a Norwegian zoologist who specialized in entomology. She was the first female professor at the Norwegian College of Agriculture, located in Ås.

== Early life and education ==
Sundby, the daughter of Halvor Sundby (a farmer) and Wilhelmine Stokke, grew up on a farm in Hof in Vestfold County in the south of Norway. After passing her school matriculation examination in 1944, she first attended the National Gymnastics School (Statens gymnastikkskole) and then studied zoology at the University of Oslo, graduating in 1951. She immediately received a scholarship from the Norwegian Research Council for Science and the Humanities in order to investigate the causes of violent fluctuations in miner moth populations. She was given a position as research assistant at the University of Oslo in 1955. In 1958, she earned a doctorate for a dissertation which concluded the fluctuations of miner moth populations were mainly a result of parasitic wasps.

== Career ==
Thanks to her doctorate, in 1958 she was appointed senior lecturer at the Norwegian College of Agriculture where she was charged with expanding the Department of Zoology. In 1969, she was promoted to full professor, the first woman to hold such a position at the college. In 1987, she became its first female Deputy Rector.

In 1959, Sundby spent 15 months at the University of California working with Paul DeBach, an expert on biological (rather than chemical) means of insect control. Together they studied the effects of parasitic wasps on various insect pests. Their work led to Competitive displacement between ecological homologues (1963) which concluded that two or more species with similar ecological requirements cannot live together. When Sundby returned to Norway in 1960, her interest in biological control increasingly turned from research to conservation, as she came up with proposals for alternatives to chemical control. Sundby chaired the Norwegian Entomological Society twice: from 1954 to 1959, and from 1964 to 1967. She also became involved in environmental issues. From 1972 to 1978 she chaired the Norwegian Society for the Conservation of Nature (Norges Naturvernforbund) and from 1974 to 1989 she was a member of Statens naturvernråd (Natural Protection Council).

== Selected publications ==
- Sundby, Ragnhild (1957). The parasites of Phyllocnistis labyrinthella Bjerk and their relation to the population dynamics of the leaf miner (PDF). John Griegs boktrykkeri.
- Sundby, Ragnhild; DeBach, Paul (1963). "Competitive displacement between ecological homologues". Hilgardia, Vol 34, No. 5: 105–166.
- Sundby, Ragnhild; Taksdal, Gudmund (1969). "Surveys of parasites of Hylomyia brassica, and H. floralis in Norway". Norsk entomologisk tidsskrift, No. 16: 97–106.
- Sundby, Ragnhild (1970). Insekter: Oversikt over norske insektgrupper (in Norwegian). Universitetsforlaget.
- Sundby, Ragnhild, ed. (1976). Rapport fra Nordisk Råds utvalg for biologisk bekjemping av skadedyr (NUBBS) (in Norwegian). Nordisk Råd.
