= Synuchus agonus =

Scientific classification
- Domain: Eukaryota
- Kingdom: Animalia
- Phylum: Arthropoda
- Class: Insecta
- Order: Coleoptera
- Suborder: Adephaga
- Family: Carabidae
- Subfamily: Harpalinae
- Genus: Synuchus
- Species: S. agonus

Binomial name
- Synuchus agonus Tschitscherine, 1895

Species of beetle

Synuchus agonus is a species of ground beetle in the subfamily Harpalinae. It was described by Tschitscherine in 1895.
