= Sigmund Hågvar =

Norwegian entomologist and environmentalist

Sigmund Hågvar (born 2 September 1944) is a Norwegian entomologist and environmentalist.

He finished his secondary education at Valler in 1963. He became a professor of nature conservation at the Norwegian University of Life Sciences.

Hågvar chaired the Norwegian Entomological Society from 1991 to 1995. In 2006 he became a fellow of the Royal Swedish Academy of Agriculture and Forestry. He has also had insects named after him, namely Syntemna haagvari and Vertagopus haagvari.

He resides at Nordstrand.
