= Synuchus semirufus =

Scientific classification
- Kingdom: Animalia
- Phylum: Arthropoda
- Class: Insecta
- Order: Coleoptera
- Suborder: Adephaga
- Family: Carabidae
- Genus: Synuchus
- Species: S. semirufus

Binomial name
- Synuchus semirufus (Casey, 1913)

Species of beetle

Synuchus semirufus is a species of ground beetle in the subfamily Harpalinae. It was described by Casey in 1913.
