= Synuchus rectangulus =

Scientific classification
- Domain: Eukaryota
- Kingdom: Animalia
- Phylum: Arthropoda
- Class: Insecta
- Order: Coleoptera
- Suborder: Adephaga
- Family: Carabidae
- Subfamily: Harpalinae
- Genus: Synuchus
- Species: S. rectangulus

Binomial name
- Synuchus rectangulus Lindroth, 1956

Species of beetle

Synuchus rectangulus is a species of ground beetle in the subfamily Harpalinae. It was described by Lindroth in 1956.
