= Thomas Georg Münster =

Norwegian politician and entomologist

- Born: March 1, 1855; Thomas Georg Münster
- Died: March 10, 1930 (aged 75); Oslo, Norway
- Occupation: Entomologist

Thomas Georg Münster (March 1, 1855 – March 10, 1938) was a mine manager. He was also a diligent entomologist with a particular interest in beetles.

== Family and education ==
Münster was born in Christiania (now Oslo). He was the son of Emil Bertrand Münster (1816–1888), a professor of metallurgy, and Andrea Sophie With (1829–1918). Münster married Betzy Marie Lund (1857 – c. 1946) on December 6, 1881. They had two children, Emma (1882–1918) and Ragnhild (1888–?). He graduated with a degree in mining in 1878 and passed a practical exam in 1879.

== Mine manager and mint administrator ==
Münster was associated with the Royal Norwegian Mint at Kongsberg and the Norwegian Directorate of Mining for most of his working life. He worked as an assistant at the Geological Survey of Norway from 1882 to 1897, mostly in the Oslo Graben. He was the mint administrator from 1899 to 1906, the mine manager for the Finnmark Mining District from 1906 to 1911, and the mine manager for the Eastern Mining District from 1911 to 1918.

== Member of parliament ==
He was elected as a deputy representative to the Parliament of Norway for the 1889–1891 term, and then served as a member of parliament from 1892 to 1894 and from 1895 to 1897 for the constituency of Kongsberg.

== Entomologist ==
Münster was one of the founders and initiators of the Norwegian Entomological Society in 1904. He served as chair of the society for 29 years. He was named an honorary member of the society in 1937. He also conceived of the journal Norsk Entomologisk Tidsskrift, and he served as its first editor from 1921 to 1932.

When he retired as a mine manager in 1918, he was given a government scholarship to continue his research on entomology. He worked at the Oslo Zoological Museum. He also contributed a well-organized insect collection of over 80,000 beetles, containing 12,000 different species, to the Oslo Zoological Museum and the University Museum of Bergen. He described 65 species of beetles new to science.

Münster donated an extensive private collection of entomology books to the University of Oslo Library. He also produced a manuscript of twelve large volumes, in which he summarized all known finds of Norwegian beetle species. He authored more than 70 entomology articles.

== Zoogeography ==
Münster was also engaged in zoogeography. Together with Knut Dahl and Johannes Lid, in 1924 he coauthored the work A Division of Norway into Bio-Geographical Sectional Areas Agreed Upon by Botanists and Zoologists.
