= Astrid Løken =

Norwegian entomologist (1911–2008)

- Born: 14 April 1911; Kristiania
- Died: 19 January 2008 (aged 96)
- Education: University of Oslo
- Known for: Member of XU 1941–1945
- Scientific career
- Fields: Entomology
- Workplaces: Research assistant, NLH; Curator, Bergen Museum (1949–1979); Senior research fellow, UiO

Astrid Løken (14 April 1911 – 19 January 2008) was a Norwegian entomologist and member of the Norwegian resistance movement during World War II. Spending most of her career at Bergen Museum, from 1949 to 1979, she was the first female member of the Norwegian Entomological Society, and specialized in the bumblebee genus Bombus.

== Early career ==
Astrid Løken was born in 1911 in Kristiania, which was renamed Oslo in 1925. She enrolled at the University of Oslo, and graduated as cand.real. in 1942. In 1941 she became the first female member of the Norwegian Entomological Society.

=== Occupation of Norway ===
On 9 April 1940, Norway was invaded by Nazi Germany and occupied after a two-month campaign. In the spring of 1941, Løken was recruited to XU, a clandestine intelligence organization which answered to the Norwegian High Command-in-exile in the United Kingdom. She bore the nom de guerre "Eva".

According to one historian, students of natural sciences were well-suited for intelligence work, as they were practically oriented and used to working in the field. In addition, their photography in the field was often regarded as inconspicuous. In 1943, Løken was granted access to Hardangervidda, a military restricted area. Under the cover of studying the genus Bombus, she had been cleared by Reichskommissar Josef Terboven, the highest Nazi leader in Norway. Travelling freely in the area, Løken managed to photograph roads, bridges and other installments. At Hardangervidda, she had access to a darkroom where she developed pictures for both entomological and military use. Since 1941 Løken used a laboratory at the Department of Biology during the night for illegal photography.

In addition to contributing her own material, she coordinated the sorting of intelligence material which was sent to the XU headquarters in Oslo. She would typically transport material by bicycle in the middle of the night. Number four in the organization, she was among the few who actually knew the location of these headquarters.

In the case of her cover being blown, she carried a cyanide suicide pill at all times. In addition, she kept a pistol, incendiary bombs and hand grenades in her bedroom. She notably escaped apprehension on 16 December 1943.

== Academic career ==
Hospitalized near the end of World War II due to general exhaustion, she travelled to the United States shortly after the May 1945 liberation of Norway, where she studied horticulture and entomology at Michigan State College. She described the Department of Entomology at Michigan State College as "impressing", in contrast to the "miserable" conditions in Norway at the time. She also spent two months in 1947 at a research station in Logan, Utah. However, in Michigan, the unmarried Løken was barred from conducting field research together with married men, as this could "spoil their reputation".

She returned to Norway, and was given her first academic position as a research assistant at the Norwegian College of Agriculture. In 1949 she was hired as associate curator at the department of zoology, Bergen Museum. She mainly worked on building the entomological collection there, as well as conducting field studies. She later became chief curator, and took the dr.philos. degree in 1973 with her thesis Studies on Scandinavian Bumble Bees. Retiring in 1979, she entered a new position as senior research fellow at the University of Oslo, where she stayed until 1990.

Løken published more than fifty scientific papers. Among others, she studied the species Bombus consobrinus and the subgenus Psithyrus.

Løken served as deputy chairman of the Norwegian Entomological Society from 1960 to 1965. She was responsible for the Nordic Entomological Convention in 1977, the first of its kind to be held in Norway outside of Oslo. She was given honorary membership in 1991.
