= Arthropodology =

Study of arthropods

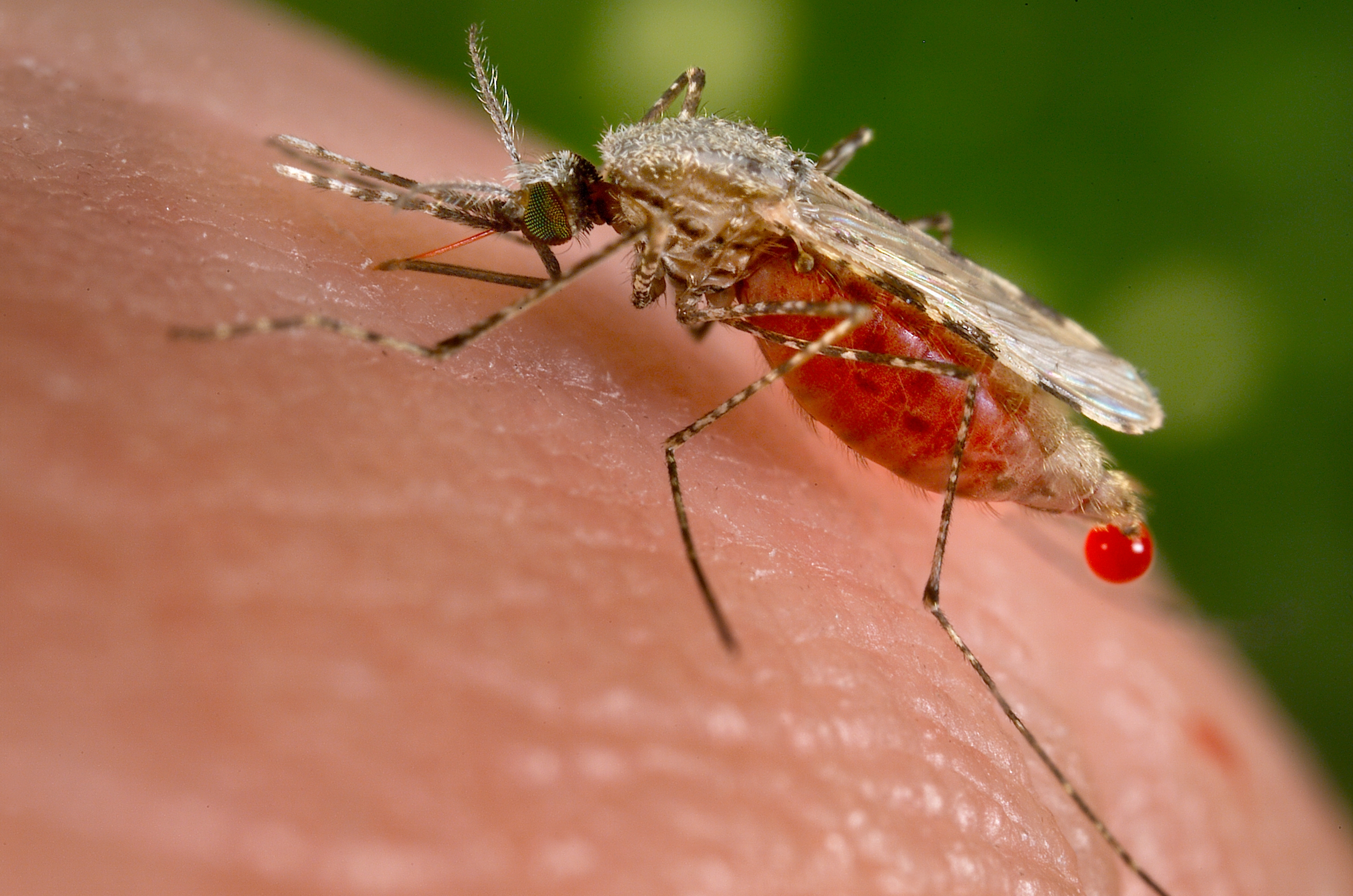
Anopheles stephensi

Arthropodology (from Greek ἄρθρον - arthron, "joint", and πούς, gen.: ποδός - pous, podos, "foot", which together mean "jointed feet") is a biological discipline concerned with the study of arthropods, a phylum of animals that include the insects, arachnids, crustaceans and others that are characterized by the possession of jointed limbs.

This field is very important in medicine, studied together with parasitology. Medical arthropodology is the study of the parasitic effect of arthropods, not only as parasites but also as vectors. The first annual Conference on Medical Arthropodology was held in Madurai (Tamil Nadu) in 2007.

== Subfields ==
Subfields of arthropodology are

- Arachnology - the study of spiders and other arachnids
- Entomology - the study of insects (until the 19th century this term was used for the study of all arthropods)
- Carcinology - the study of crustaceans
- Myriapodology - the study of centipedes, millipedes, and other myriapods

== Journals ==
- Journal of Arthropodology

== Bibliography ==
- Vargas, V M. 1976. Notas sobre Artropodología Médica. Oficina de Publicaciones Universidad de Costa Rica.
