= Tor Helliesen =

Norwegian entomologist (1855 – 1914)

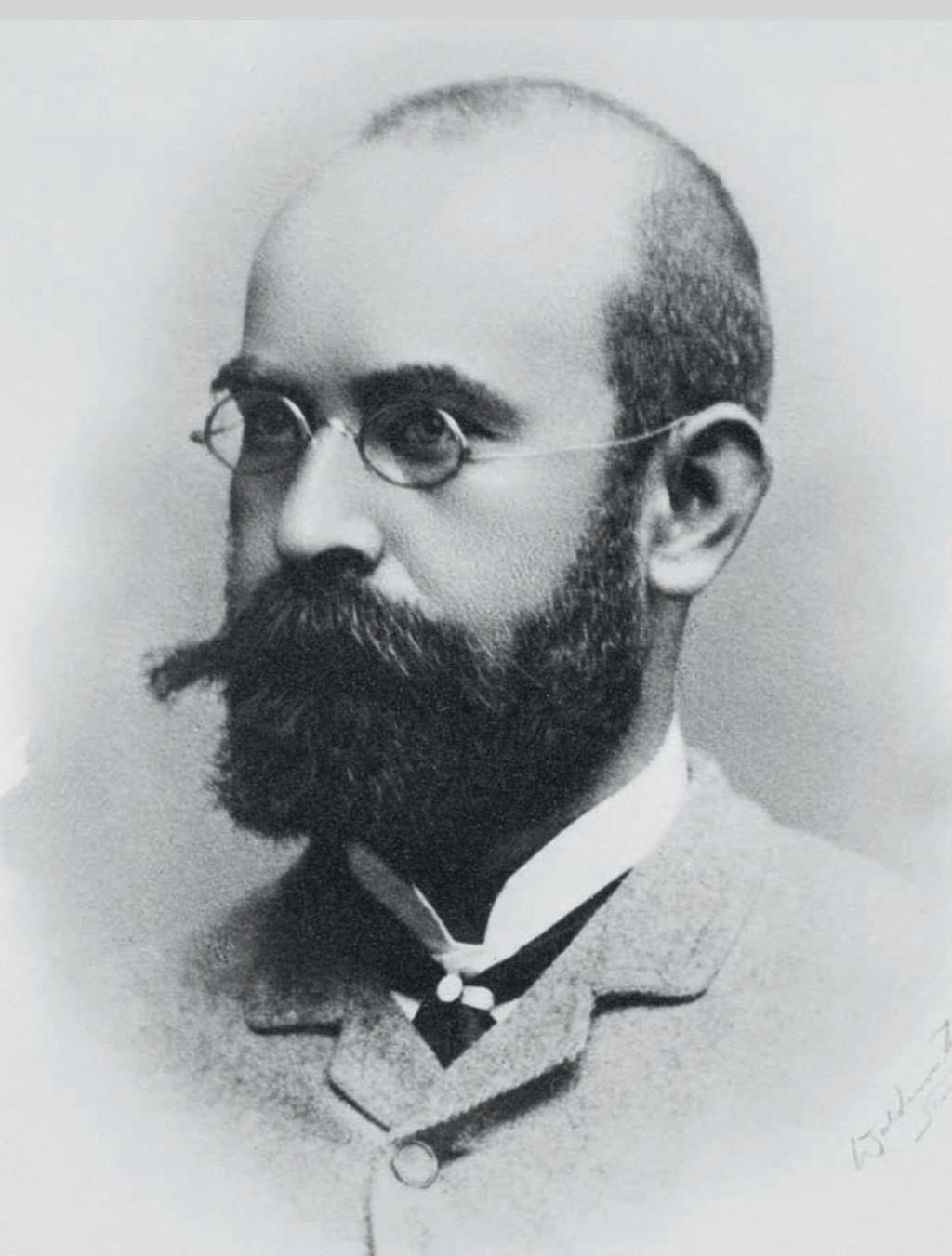

Tor Ambrosius Helliesen (24 January 1855 – 16 July 1914) was a Norwegian entomologist who worked as the first curator of Stavanger Museum from 1882 to 1914. He helped develop the museum, particularly its natural history sections, taking a special interest in entomology and also in archaeology.

== Life and work ==
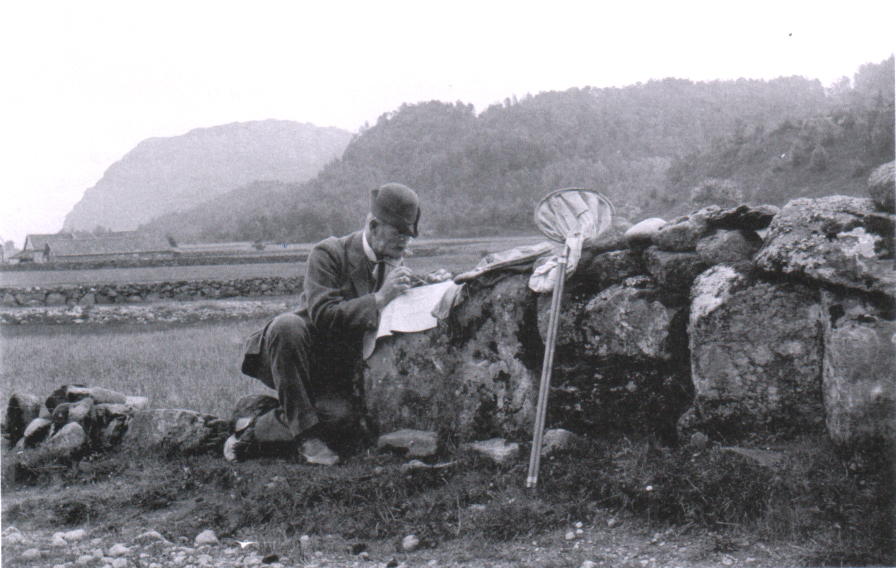
Collecting insects in the field

Helliesen was born in Fredrikshald, the son of customs official Henrich and his second wife Anne Mathilde née Hansen. He was the fourth of six children and there were also six older six half siblings. His father died when he was six and his mother moved to Oslo where he completed school at the Maribogadens Skole (1873). He went to the University of Oslo in 1876 and qualified as a teacher in 1881. He then taught at the Frøken Falsens Girls' School and at Kristiania Private Borgerskole. He then joined the Stavanger Museum in 1882. His paternal grandparents were from Stavanger and a position had opened following the resignation of Sophus A. Buch. The museum had been founded in 1877 and included natural history and ethnographic objects. Helliesen was involved in developing the museum and in 1890 the museum had 11000 visitors. He took a special interest in the natural history collections and began to collect insect specimens. He also took an interest in archaeology and encouraged donations from the public. He was involved in the development of a new legislation on antiquities in 1905. In 1908 the work of archaeology was taken up by Anton Wilhelm Brøgger, allowing Helliesen to focus on natural history. After Brøgger left in 1913, the position was taken by Helge Gjessing. Fritz Jensen became an assistant to Helliesen. He also encouraged local amateur entomologists such as Andreas Strand.

Helliesen was a good illustrator and he began to document archaeological sites. He noticed that many sites were slowly being destroyed, so he began to document their locations and describe them systematically establishing registries of sites. An Act for the preservation of antiquities was passed in 1905 and in the next year Stavanger and Bergen museums were given rights to the antiquities of the county.

Helliesen married Alvilde Christine Pedersen in 1890. They had a daughter Herdis, but the couple separated in 1896 and were granted a divorce only in 1899, at a time when divorces were rare. Herdis lived with her father and trained in music and dance. Helliesen was interested in gymnastics, music, the outdoors, and the Esperanto language. He wrote some entomological articles in Esperanto. In 1893 he had tried to establish a poultry industry along with two other businesspeople but the business was hit by a chicken disease. In 1914 he was admitted to Stavanger hospital for a stomach ulcer surgery and died shortly after.
