= Norwegian Journal of Entomology =

- Discipline: Entomology, arthropodology
- Language: English
- Edited by: Øivind Gammelmo

Publication details
- Former names: Norsk Entomologisk Tidsskrift, Fauna Norvegica Serie B
- History: 1921–present
- Publisher: Norwegian Entomological Society (Norway)
- Frequency: Biannually
- Open access: Delayed, after 3 years

Standard abbreviations
- ISO 4: Nor. J. Entomol.

Indexing
- ISSN: 1501-8415
- LCCN: 00252503
- OCLC no.: 693644428

Links
- Journal homepage

The Norwegian Journal of Entomology is a biannual peer-reviewed scientific journal covering entomology, and arthropodology more in general, with an emphasis on Norway. It was established in 1920 as the Norsk Entomologisk Tidsskrift, obtaining its current title in 1974. From 1979 to 1998 it was published under the name Fauna Norvegica Serie B. The journal is published by the Norwegian Entomological Society and the editor-in-chief is Øivind Gammelmo.

== History ==
The first issue of the journal appeared in 1921 under the name Norsk Entomologisk Tidsskrift. The first issue bore the year 1920 as the year of publication, but it was not printed until May 1921. From 1921 to 1975, 21 volumes of the journal were published; some volumes were released over several years, whereas others came out at shorter intervals.

In 1975 the journal's name was changed to Norwegian Journal of Entomology in order to attract a broader international readership. The journal was published with one volume per year and consisted of two issues. Eventually there was difficulty financing the journal. The Norwegian Research Council for Science and the Humanities (NAVF) withdrew its support for the journal in 1979.

An application for support for a new combined national zoology journal was sent to the NAVF. The new journal was a collaboration between the Norwegian Zoological Society and the Norwegian Ornithological Society. The first issue appeared in 1979 and the name of the journal was Fauna Norvegica Serie B (Series B was for arthropods, Series A was for zoology, and Series C was for ornithology). In 1993, the NAVF withdrew its support for the journal, but the Norwegian Institute for Nature Research (NINA) took over responsibility. However, for financial reasons, NINA also terminated the agreement in 1998, and the journal's further existence was jeopardized.

The journal was able to continue publication in 1999, now under the aegis of the Norwegian Entomological Society, thanks to support from the Norwegian Ministry of the Environment. The journal's name was changed once more, back to its previously English name, Norwegian Journal of Entomology.

== Editors ==
- Thomas Georg Münster, Karl Haanshus, and Leif Reinhardt Natvig (1920–1930)
- Thor Hiorth Schøyen (1933–1952)
- Leif Reinhardt Natvig (1953–1955)
- Nils Knaben (1956–1965)
- Lauritz Sømme (1966–1978)
- Ole Anton Sæther (1979–1984)
- John O. Solem (1985–1998)
- Lauritz Sømme (1999–2007)
- Øivind Gammelmo (2008–present)

== Abstracting and indexing ==
The journal is abstracted and indexed in:

- Aquatic Sciences and Fisheries Abstracts
- Biological Abstracts
- BIOSIS Previews
- CAB Abstracts
- GEOBASE
- Scopus
- The Zoological Record
