= Norwegian Entomological Society =

Organization

The Norwegian Entomological Society (Norwegian: Norsk entomologisk forening, NEF) was established in 1904. The purpose of the society is to promote an interest in and the study of entomology in Norway and to establish contact between the interested parties. The society is open to both amateurs and experts. Anyone with an interest in insects or other arthropod groups can become a member.

Local branches of the society are located in the largest Norwegian cities, and they organize excursions to particularly interesting sites and guides who offer advice on identifying species and preparing collected material.

== History ==
The society was founded by ten enthusiasts; none of them were entomologists by profession, but two were biologists. All of them shared an interest in insects. Thomas Georg Münster originally came up with the initiative, and he served as the society's first chairman. The following year, two more members joined the society and it received its first charter. Work with butterflies and beetles occupied the society's members during its early years.

Institutions were allowed to become members of the society in 1921, the first one being the Norwegian College of Agricultural in Ås. In 1922, the society started admitting individual members from abroad. Membership of the society gradually grew, and in 1930 there were about 40 individual members. The society had about 400 members in 2008. The society is open to anyone that would like to be a member.

This has not always been the case; previously, another member had to recommend individuals for membership in the society, and membership was approved after assessment by the board. For example, Arne Semb-Johansson became a member in 1939 at the recommendation of Fridthjof Økland. In the process, he received a letter from Leif Reinhardt Natvig, stating: "Through Dr. Økland I have been informed that you would like to become a member of the Norwegian Entomological Society. To that end, I am bound to obtain some information from you: date of birth, place of birth, position, and which insect group you collect or are especially interested in. I will then present the matter at the society's next board meeting. Yours, Leif Reinhardt Natvig." Later Semb-Johansson received a second letter: "I have the honor to inform you that you have been admitted as a member of the Norwegian Entomological Society."

== Surveying insects in Norway ==
In order to be able to survey the prevalence of Norwegian insects, a simple geographical system for locating sightings was needed. In 1924, Thomas Georg Münster and others created a system that divided Norway into bio-geographical sectional areas for botanists and zoologists using number codes. Eventually it turned out that this was little used.

In 1943, Andreas Strand came up with a new system called Inndeling av Norge til bruk ved faunistiske oppgaver (Division of Norway for Use in Fauna Tasks), popularly known as the Strand System. In it, Norway was divided into 37 regions based on municipal and county boundaries, and it took into account that the fauna in the interior parts of the country differed from the fauna on the coast. Therefore, most Norwegian counties are divided into smaller areas (e.g., inner, outer, north, or south). Strand chose letter codes instead of numbers; for example, HOY is the code for outer Hordaland (Hordaland, ytre).

The system was revised in 1981 by Karen Anna Økland because the municipal boundaries had also been revised. This system is recommended by the society and is used in all publications.

Since the 1960s, UTM coordinates have routinely been used for mapping species.

Since 1978, the European Invertebrate Survey (EIS) system has been recommended. In this system, Europe is divided into squares of 50 by 50 kilometers (31 mi × 31 mi). In a separate limited system for Norway, the squares are adapted to the Norwegian map and numbered from 1 to 189. For example, Oslo is in the square designated EIS 28. This gives the Norwegian map a grid that is well-suited for demarcating a species' distribution.

In May 2008, the Norwegian Species Observation System (Artsobservasjoner) was launched; this is an internet-based service where sightings can be published. The Norwegian Entomological Society is one of five organizations working with the Norwegian Biodiversity Information Centre (Artsdatabanken) to operate the website.

== Journal and other publications ==
There were no Norwegian entomological journals in the early years. The first publications by Norwegian entomologists appeared in the Swedish Entomologisk Tidskrift (Entomological Journal), which was not unexpected because Norway was in a union with Sweden. Other articles also appeared in series published by the Royal Norwegian Society of Sciences and Letters and in Nyt Magazin for Naturvidenskaberne (New Journal for the Natural Sciences). This situation was not satisfactory, and the first issue of Norsk Entomologisk Tidsskrift (now Norwegian Journal of Entomology) appeared in May 1921.

- Norwegian Journal of Entomology is the association's research journal, and it is sent to all members. It is issued twice a year. The journal has been published since 1921; it was originally called Norsk Entomologisk Tidsskrift and it has changed its name several times. Back issues are posted online and can be read at the Norwegian Entomological Society's website.
- Catalogus Coleopterorum Daniae et Fennoscandiae (Register of Beetles of Denmark and Fennoscandia) inventoried beetles and was published in 1939. It was the first complete register of the distribution of a group of insects in Norway.
- Atalanta norvegica (The Norwegian Atalanta) was published from 1967 to 1983, and it was a companion publication to the Norwegian Journal of Entomology. It was dedicated to the study of Norwegian butterflies. The journal is no longer published, but it can be read on the Norwegian Entomological Society's website.
- Insekt-Nytt (Insect News) is written in a popular science style and is the society's members' magazine. It was first published in 1976, and it appears four times a year. It contains material on collection and preparation, literature on Norwegian insects, brief presentations of insects or insect groups, and new discoveries. Other arthropod groups such as arachnids are also covered in the magazine. Issues of the magazine over five years old can be read on the Norwegian Entomological Society's website.
- Insecta norvegiae (Insects of Norway) is a journal that publishes major works such as individual volumes, checklists, bibliographies, and so on. It is published at irregular intervals.
- Norske Insekttabeller (Norwegian Insect Tables) is a series of inexpensive Norwegian-language booklets with identification tables for smaller groups of Norway's insect fauna. All the booklets are available on the Norwegian Entomological Society's website.
- Catalogus Lepidopterorum Norvegiae (Register of Norwegian Butterflies) appeared in 2002, and it is based on about 125,000 sightings of butterflies in Norway. Its information is available in a searchable database.

== Chairs of the society ==
- Thomas Georg Münster, 1904–1937
- Leif Reinhardt Natvig, 1937–1949
- Arne Semb-Johansson, 1950–1953
- Ragnhild Sundby, 1954–1959 and 1964–1967
- Alf Bakke, 1960–1963 and 1971–1974
- Hans Kauri, 1968–1970
- Reidar Mehl, 1975–1976
- Karl Erik Zachariassen, 1977–1990
- Sigmund Hågvar, 1991–1995
- Preben S. Ottesen, 1996–2000
- Leif Aarvik, 2003–2007
- Geir E. E. Søli, 2008–

== Honorary members ==
- Thomas Georg Münster
- Andreas Strand
- Magne Opheim
- Carl Fredrik Lühr
- Eivind Sundt
- Astrid Løken
- Tore Randulff Nielsen
- Lauritz Sømme
