= Carl H. Lindroth =

Swedish entomologist

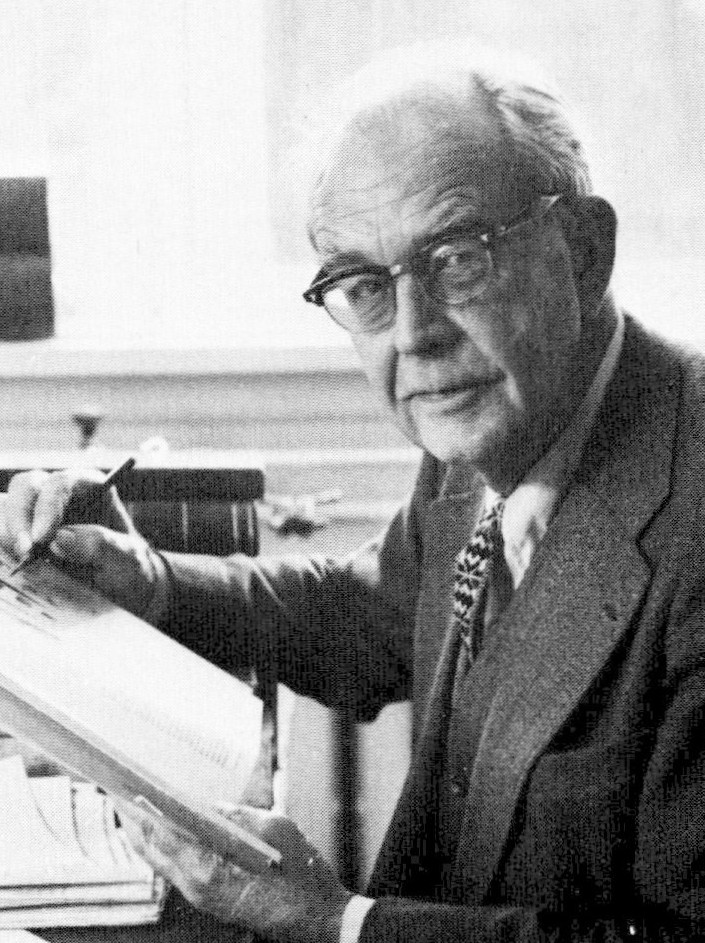
Carl H. Lindroth.

Carl Hildebrand Lindroth (8 September 1905 – 23 February 1979) was a Swedish entomologist and a professor at Lund University. He was a specialist in carabidology (the study of ground beetles), with a special interest in biogeography. He was a strong proponent of the glacial refugium hypothesis and made use of the framework to explain the distribution patterns of Scandinavian beetles.

== Life and work ==
Lindroth was born on 8 September 1905 in Lund, Sweden, to Professor Hjalmar Lindroth and Stina Hildebrand. His brother Arne became an ecologist while brother Sten became a historian. The Lund home on Magnus Stenbock Street was close to the noted Cathedral School. The family moved to Gothenburg where he went to school, and graduated from Göteborgs Högre Latinläroverk in 1923. His natural history interests were developed at the Gothenburg natural history museum and he was influenced by A. L. Jägerskiöld and Emil Sandin.

He moved to Stockholm University for his undergraduate studies in 1923, and in 1926 he enrolled at Uppsala University to continue his graduate studies. Uppsala University was known for work in biogeography, especially for the work of Sven Ekman. Lindroth's dissertation from 1931 was titled Die Insektenfauna Islands und ihre Probleme ("The insect fauna of Iceland and its problems"), in which he examined the insect fauna of Iceland and the biogeographical puzzles they posed. He became a professor of entomology at Lund University in 1951 and gained a reputation for his lectures and as a teacher. He continued to work extensively on the Carabidae ground beetle and examined its distribution in the light of past climatic changes.

== Research ==
Lindroth examined wing polymorphisms in ground beetles and supported the view that wingless or brachypterous forms tended to be in greater number within the centres of origin of a species, while areas with a preponderance of winged forms tended to be areas that were recently colonized. He also examined the distribution of ground beetles across the North Atlantic and found that the distribution of more than 40 species of North American beetle could not be accounted for except by inadvertent transport by humans from Europe. According to Lindroth, many of the species may have been transferred in ship ballast prior to World War I, with Newfoundland being the earliest region for establishment of many species.

Lindroth also examined cuticular microsculpture patterns on the elytra of beetles and introduced their use, especially for the identification of fossil species.

== Other activities ==
Lindroth was a member of the Royal Swedish Academy of Sciences from 1964 and was well known for his popular science lectures, appearing on the television program Fråga Lund. He wrote a book for children, Myran Emma, in 1948, which was made into a short animated film by Jaromir Wesely in 1989. The book follows the life of a red wood ant called Emma, from egg to adulthood.

== Personal life ==
Lindroth married Gun Bodman in 1931. After her death in 1972, he married the textile artist Marianne Richter in 1974. He died on 23 February 1979 and is buried at the cemetery of Norra kyrkogården in Lund. In 2007, the Society for Applied Carabidology instituted the Carl H. Lindroth Prize to honor the work of present-day carabidologists.
