= Fastest animals =

This is a list of the fastest animals in the world, by types of animal. The peregrine falcon is the fastest bird, and the fastest member of the animal kingdom, with a diving speed of over 300 km/h (190 mph). The fastest land animal is the cheetah, capable of running at speeds of up to 93–104 km/h (58–65 mph). Among the fastest animals in the sea is the black marlin, with uncertain and conflicting reports of recorded speeds.

When drawing comparisons between different classes of animals, an alternative unit is sometimes used for organisms: body length per second. On this basis the 'fastest' organism on earth, relative to its body length, is the Southern Californian mite, Paratarsotomus macropalpis, which has a speed of 322 body lengths per second. The equivalent speed for a human, running as fast as this mite, would be 1,300 mph (2,092 km/h), or approximately Mach 1.7. The speed of the P. macropalpis is far in excess of the previous record holder, the Australian tiger beetle Rivacindela eburneola, which is the fastest insect in the world relative to body size, with a recorded speed of 1.86 metres per second (6.7 km/h; 4.2 mph), or 171 body lengths per second. The cheetah, the fastest land mammal, scores at only 16 body lengths per second. Body mass can also be used to compare speed between species on a relative basis. Under this parameter the fastest animal for its body mass is the cheetah, followed by the pronghorn.

Through studies of pronghorn running on treadmills, it has been estimated that the maximum speed that could be achieved aerobically would be 72 km/h (45 mph) for about 10 minutes, so higher speeds such as those reported in Thomson's gazelles, springboks, pronghorn and cheetahs require adaptations for principal use of anaerobic energy sources such as glycogen and creatine phosphate, and could therefore be maintained for only 30–45 seconds when these energy sources are depleted. High acceleration also requires the use of anaerobic energy sources.

== Fastest organism ==
List of animals by speed
Rank	Animal	Maximum speed	Class	Notes
1	Peregrine falcon	389 km/h (242 mph); 108 m/s (354 ft/s)	Flight-diving	The peregrine falcon is the fastest aerial animal, fastest animal in flight, fastest bird, and the overall fastest member of the animal kingdom. The peregrine achieves its highest velocity not in horizontal level flight, but during its characteristic hunting stoop (vertical flight). While stooping, the peregrine falcon soars to a great height, then dives steeply at speed of over 320 km/h (200 mph). Assuming the maximum size at 58 cm (23 in), its relative speed clocks at 186 body lengths per second during its hunting swoop, the equivalent of a human running at 170 m/s (560 ft/s).
2	Golden eagle	240–320 km/h (150–200 mph); 67–89 m/s (220–293 ft/s)	Flight-diving	Assuming the maximum size at 1.02 m (3 ft 4 in), its relative speed clocks at 66–87 body lengths per second, the equivalent of a human running at 60–80 m/s (197–262 ft/s).
3	Gyrfalcon	209 km/h (130 mph)	Flight-diving	
4	White-throated needletail swift	169 km/h (105 mph)	Flight	The fastest flying bird in flapping flight.
5	Eurasian hobby	160 km/h (100 mph)	Flight	Can sometimes outfly the swift.
6	Mexican free-tailed bat	160 km/h (100 mph)	Flight	It has been claimed to have the fastest horizontal speed (as opposed to stoop diving speed) of any animal.
7	Frigatebird	153 km/h (95 mph)	Flight	The frigatebird's high speed is helped by its having the largest wing-area-to-body-weight ratio of any bird.
8	Rock dove (pigeon)	148.9 km/h (92.5 mph)	Flight	Pigeons have been clocked flying 92.5 mph (148.9 km/h) and normally average 50 to 60 mph(80 to 96 km/h)
9	Spur-winged goose	142 km/h (88 mph)	Flight	
10	Black marlin	129 km/h (80 mph)	Swimming	A hooked black marlin has been recorded stripping line off a fishing reel at 118 feet per second (80 mph; 129 km/h).
11	Grey-headed albatross	127 km/h (79 mph) (Note: Sustained ground speed for approximately nine hours with no rest on high tailwinds during an Antarctic storm.)	Flight	
12	Cheetah	109.4–120.7 km/h (68.0–75.0 mph) (Note: Different sources cite different speeds; estimates include 96–120 km/h (60–75 mph), 98 km/h (61 mph), 100 km/h (62 mph), 104 km/h (65 mph), and 104.4 km/h (64.9 mph). There is a tendency to overestimate the speed of fast animals, and claims of the cheetah running 114 km/h (71 mph) or faster have been discredited.)	Land	Fastest land animal, fastest feline, the cheetah can accelerate from 0 to 97 km/h (60 mph) in less than three seconds, "faster than a Ferrari", though endurance is limited. The highest speed reliably recorded for the species is 104 km/h (65 mph).
13	Sailfish	109.19 km/h (67.85 mph)	Flight-swimming	In a series of tests carried out in a fishing cam at Long Key, Florida, United States, sailfish swam and leapt 91 meters (300 ft) in 3 seconds, equivalent to a speed of 109 km/h (68 mph), although this speed includes leaps out of the water, which do not strictly qualify as swimming speed.
14	Anna's hummingbird	98.27 km/h (61.06 mph)	Flight	The stated speed equals 276 body lengths per second, the highest known length-specific velocity attained by any vertebrate.
15	Swordfish	97 km/h (60 mph)	Swimming	The 60 mph (97 km/h) figure listed for the swordfish is based on a corrupted version of calculations made by Sir James Gray to estimate the impact speed necessary for a hypothetical 600-pound (270 kg) swordfish to embed its sword 3 feet in the timbers of ships, as has been known to occur; the figure seems to have entered the literature without question as though someone had actually timed a swordfish at that speed.
16	Ostrich	61–97 km/h (38–60 mph)	Land	The ostrich is the fastest bird on land, as well as the fastest running animal on two legs. The highest reliably measured running speed for ostriches is 61 km/h (38 mph), obtained by speedometer reading when a car was chasing an ostrich in a straight line chase to force it to move as fast as it could. Although there are reports of speeds of 72–97 km/h (45–60 mph) for ostriches, none are confirmed.
17	Pronghorn	88.5 km/h (55.0 mph) (Note: Estimates include "over 53 miles (86 kilometers) per hour", 88.5 km/h (55.0 mph), an "alleged top speed of 60 miles an hour [96.6 km/h]" (emphasis added), 98 km/h (61 mph), and "a top speed of about 100 km/h [62 mph]" (emphasis added).)	Land	The pronghorn (American antelope) is the fastest animal over long distances; it can run at 56 km/h (35 mph) for 6 km (3.7 mi), and 67 km/h (42 mph) for 1.6 km (0.99 mi). Pronghorns can reach a top speed of 60 mph (97 km/h) in favorable conditions (flat dry lake beds), and a top speed of 50 mph (80 km/h) normally. These speeds can only be achieved for short periods of time. They can reach speeds of 72 km/h (45 mph) in a 2–3 km course. Estimated by observing the odometer when the animal ran at its maximum speed, alongside a vehicle.
18	Springbok	88 km/h (55 mph)	Land	The springbok, an antelope of the gazelle tribe in southern Africa, can make long jumps and sharp turns while running.
19	Quarter Horse	88.5 km/h (55.0 mph)	Land	The American Quarter Horse, or Quarter Horse, is an American breed of horse that excels at sprinting short distances. Its name came from its ability to outdistance other horse breeds in races of a quarter mile or less; some have been clocked at speeds up to 88.5 km/h (55.0 mph).
20	Blue wildebeest	80.5 km/h (50.0 mph) (Note: Estimates include 70 km/h (43 mph) (specifically the black wildebeest), "approximately 80 km/h or 50 mph", and "over 50 miles per hour [80.5 km/h]" (specifically the blue wildebeest).)	Land	The wildebeest, an antelope, exists as two species: the blue wildebeest and the black wildebeest. Both are extremely fast runners, which allows them to flee from predators. They are better at maintaining endurance for long distances than at sprinting. Estimated by observing the odometer when an animal ran at its maximum speed, alongside a vehicle on a road.
21	Thomson's gazelle	80.5 km/h (50.0 mph)	Land	Thomson's gazelles, being long-distance runners, can escape cheetahs by sheer endurance. Their speed is partially due to their "stotting", or bounding leaps. Estimated by observing the odometer when an animal ran at its maximum speed, alongside a vehicle on a road.

== Invertebrates ==
Animal	Maximum recorded speed	Class	Notes
Austrophlebia costalis	98.6 km/h (61.3 mph)	Flight	Fastest verified insect flight.
Members of Loliginidae and Ommastrephidae	36 km/h (22 mph)	Flight-swimming	Many of these species "fly" out of the water to escape danger. The Japanese flying squid can glide for 3 seconds over 30 metres.
Tiger beetle	6.8 km/h (4.2 mph)	Land	The Australian tiger beetle, Rivacindela eburneola, is one of the fastest running insects in the world relative to body size, which has been recorded at 6.8 km/h (4.2 mph) or 171 body lengths per second. It can fly at 43 km/h (27 mph).
Paratarsotomus macropalpis	22 cm/s (8.7 in/s); 0.8 km/h (0.5 mph)	Land	0.7 mm long mite endemic to Southern California, tracked running up to 322 body lengths per second, equivalent to a human running at around 2,092 km/h (1,300 mph). Because of this feat, it is ranked the fastest animal on the planet relative to its body size. It can also achieve this speed across a concrete surface at a temperature of 60 °C (140 °F), which is lethal to many animals.

== Fish ==
Due to physical constraints, fish may be incapable of exceeding swim speeds of 36 km/h (22 mph). The larger reported figures below are therefore highly questionable:

Animal	Maximum recorded speed	Class	Notes
Black marlin	129 km/h (80 mph)	Swimming	A hooked black marlin has been recorded stripping line off a fishing reel at 118 feet per second (80 mph; 129 km/h).
Sailfish	109.19 km/h (67.85 mph)	Swimming	In a series of tests carried out in a fishing cam at Long Key, Florida, United States, sailfish swam and leapt 91 meters (300 ft) in 3 seconds, equivalent to a speed of 109 km/h (68 mph), although this speed includes leaps out of the water, which do not strictly qualify as swimming speed.
Swordfish	97 km/h (60 mph)	Swimming	The 60 mph (97 km/h) figure listed for the swordfish is based on a corrupted version of calculations made by Sir James Gray to estimate the impact speed necessary for a hypothetical 600-pound (270 kg) swordfish to embed its sword 3 feet in the timbers of ships, as has been known to occur; the figure seems to have entered the literature without question as though someone had actually timed a swordfish at that speed.
Yellowfin tuna	76 km/h (47 mph)	Swimming	Many tuna species are capable of swimming at fast speeds colloquially cited at around 80 km/h (50 mph). The tails of tuna move fast enough to cause cavitation, which slows them down as vapour accumulates. Tuna have bony fins without nerve endings, which prevents the fish from feeling the pain of cavitation but does not fully protect them from the implosive damage.
Shortfin mako shark	72 km/h (45 mph)	Swimming	Underwater and unimpeded by a fishing line, the Shortfin mako has been reliably clocked at 50 km/h (31 mph), and there is a claim that one individual of this species achieved a burst speed of 74 km/h (46 mph). But it is extremely difficult if not outright impossible to get a fish in the wild to swim in a straight line over a measured course. Laboratory measurements of numerous kinds of fishes – representing a wide range of body sizes – swimming against an artificial current have revealed a surprisingly uniform maximum burst speed of about 10 times the body length per second. Thus, for an average-sized, 2 m (6.5 ft) shortfin, its theoretical maximum speed might be something on the order of 72 km/h (45 mph). Yet some estimates of the top-speed of a shortfin mako are considerably higher.
Great white shark	24.12 km/h (14.99 mph)	Swimming	White sharks are estimated to swim 2.88–4.86 km/h (1.79–3.02 mph) but can sprint up to 6.7 m/s (24.12 km/h; 14.99 mph).

== Amphibians ==
Animal	Maximum recorded speed	Class	Notes
Nauta salamander	24.14 km/h (15.00 mph)	Land	Also known as the Andean Salamander, it is the fastest amphibian recorded.

== Reptiles ==
Animal	Maximum recorded speed	Class	Notes
Perentie	40.23 km/h (25.00 mph)	Land	Generally considered the fastest recorded reptile.
Green Iguana	35.41 km/h (22.00 mph)	Land	Green Iguanas are large arboreal lizards capable of running at high speed on the ground.
Leatherback sea turtle	35.28 km/h (21.92 mph)	Swimming	These turtles have the most hydrodynamic body design of any sea turtle, with a large, teardrop-shaped body.
Costa Rican spiny-tailed iguana	34.6 km/h (21.5 mph)	Land	Often cited as the world's fastest lizard in older sources.
Six-lined racerunner	28.97 km/h (18.00 mph)	Land	A small lizard found throughout the Southern United States and Mexico.
Black mamba	22.53 km/h (14.00 mph)	Land	
Komodo dragon	20 km/h (12 mph)	Land	Komodo dragons can run briefly up to 20 km/h (12 mph) but prefer to hunt by stealth.

== Birds ==
Animal	Maximum recorded speed	Class	Notes
Peregrine falcon	389 km/h (242 mph)	Flight-diving	The peregrine falcon is the fastest bird, and the fastest member of the animal kingdom. While not the fastest bird at level (horizontal) flight, its great speed is achieved in its hunting dive (vertical flight), the stoop, wherein it soars to a great height, then dives steeply at speeds of over 200 mph (320 km/h).
Golden eagle	240–320 km/h (150–200 mph)	Flight-diving	In full stoop, a golden eagle can reach spectacular speeds of up to 240 to 320 km/h (150 to 200 mph) when diving after prey. Although less agile and maneuverable, the golden eagle is apparently quite the equal and possibly even the superior of the peregrine falcon's stooping and gliding speed.
Gyrfalcon	187–209 km/h (116–130 mph)	Flight-diving	
White-throated needletail swift	169 km/h (105 mph)	Flight	The fastest flying bird in flapping flight.
Eurasian hobby	160 km/h (100 mph)	Flight	It can sometimes even outfly birds such as the swift when hunting.
Frigatebird	153 km/h (95 mph)	Flight	The frigatebird's high speed is helped by its having the largest wing-area-to-body-weight ratio of any bird.
Rock dove (pigeon)	148.9 km/h (92.5 mph)	Flight	Pigeons have been clocked flying 92.5 mph (148.9 km/h) average speed on a 400-mile (640 km) race.
Spur-winged goose	142 km/h (88 mph)	Flight	
Red-breasted merganser	129 km/h (80 mph)	Flight	
Grey-headed albatross	127 km/h (79 mph)	Flight	
Anna's hummingbird	98.27 km/h (61.06 mph)	Flight	The stated speed equals 276 body lengths per second, the highest known length-specific velocity attained by any vertebrate.
Ostrich	80–97 km/h (50–60 mph)	Land	The ostrich is the fastest bird on land, as well as the fastest running animal on two legs. The highest reliably measured running speed for ostriches is 61 km/h (38 mph), obtained by speedometer reading when a car was chasing an ostrich in a straight line chase to force it to move as fast as it could. Although there are reports of speeds of 72–97 km/h (45–60 mph) for ostriches, none are confirmed.
Emu	46–50 km/h (29–31 mph)	Land	
Cassowary	46–50 km/h (29–31 mph)	Land	
Roadrunner	32–43 km/h (20–27 mph)	Land	

== Mammals ==
Animal	Maximum speed	Class	Notes
Mexican free-tailed bat	160 km/h (99 mph)	Flight	It is the fastest mammal in the world and one of the fastest flying animals on level flight.
Cheetah	109.4–120.7 km/h (68.0–75.0 mph) (Note: Different sources cite different speeds; estimates include 96–120 km/h (60–75 mph), 98 km/h (61 mph), 100 km/h (62 mph), 104 km/h (65 mph), and 104.4 km/h (64.9 mph). There is a tendency to overestimate the speed of fast animals, and claims of the cheetah running 114 km/h (71 mph) or faster have been discredited.)	Land	The cheetah can accelerate from 0 to 97 km/h (60 mph) in under three seconds, though endurance is limited: most specimens run for only 60 seconds at a time. When sprinting, they spend more time in the air than on the ground. See Sarah, the fastest cheetah. A widely quoted top speed figure of 71 mph (114 km/h) has been discredited due to lax and questionable methodology. The highest speed reliably and rigorously measured in cheetahs in a straight line is 29 m/s (104 km/h), as an average of 3 runs over a 201.2-meter (220 yards) course (starting from start line already running). Top speed data is result of dividing distance by time spent.
Pronghorn	80–96 km/h (50–60 mph)	Land	The pronghorn (American antelope) is the fastest animal over long distances; it can run at 56 km/h (35 mph) for 6 km (3.7 mi), and 67 km/h (42 mph) for 1.6 km (0.99 mi). Pronghorns can reach a top speed of 60 mph (97 km/h) in favorable conditions (flat dry lake beds), and a top speed of 50 mph (80 km/h) normally. These speeds can only be achieved for short periods of time. They can reach speeds of 72 km/h (45 mph) in a 2–3 km course. Speeds of 85 km/h (53 mph) in a 274 m (300 yards) course has been reported. Estimated by observing the odometer when the animal ran at its maximum speed, alongside a vehicle.
Springbok	88 km/h (55 mph)	Land	The springbok, an antelope of the gazelle tribe in southern Africa, can make long jumps and sharp turns while running.
Tsessebe	70–90 km/h (43–56 mph)	Land	Estimated by observing the odometer when an animal ran at its maximum speed, alongside a vehicle on a road.
Domestic Horse	70.76–88.5 km/h (43.97–54.99 mph)	Land	The fastest horse speed was achieved by a Thoroughbred. Polo horses can go from 0 to 36 km/h in 3.6 seconds. Equids are noted for their extraordinary running endurance. An 1853 report mentions that a horse covered 160 km (100 miles) at an average speed of 18 km/h (11.2 mph).
Thomson's gazelle	65.16–90 km/h (40.49–55.92 mph) (Note: Estimates include 64 km/h (40 mph) and 70 km/h (43 mph).)	Land	Thomson's gazelles, being long-distance runners, can escape cheetahs by sheer endurance. Their speed is partially due to their "stotting", or bounding leaps. 80 km/h estimated by observing the odometer when an animal ran at its maximum speed, alongside a vehicle on a road. A top speed of 65.2 km/h is obtained by calculating the distance and time it takes a gazelle to escape from an approaching human. Film analysis of lion hunts gives maximum speeds of 90–97 km/h.
Wildebeest	80.5 km/h (50.0 mph) (Note: Estimates include 70 km/h (43 mph) (specifically the black wildebeest), "approximately 80 km/h or 50 mph", and "over 50 miles per hour [80.5 km/h]" (specifically the blue wildebeest).)	Land	The wildebeest, an antelope, exists as two species: the blue wildebeest and the black wildebeest. Both are extremely fast runners, which allows them to flee from predators. They are better at maintaining endurance for long distances than at sprinting. Estimated by observing the odometer when an animal ran at its maximum speed, alongside a vehicle on a road.
Blackbuck	80 km/h (50 mph)	Land	The blackbuck antelope can sustain speeds of 80 km/h (50 mph) for over 1.5 km (0.93 mi) at a time. Each of its strides (i.e., the distance between its hoofprints) is 5.8–6.7 m (19–22 ft).
Grant's gazelle	64–80 km/h (40–50 mph)	Land	Estimated by observing the odometer when an animal ran at its maximum speed, alongside a vehicle on a road.
Hartebeest	70–80 km/h (43–50 mph)	Land	Estimated by observing the odometer when an animal ran at its maximum speed, alongside a vehicle on a road.
Impala	60–80 km/h (37–50 mph)	Land	Estimated by observing the odometer when an animal ran at its maximum speed, alongside a vehicle on a road.
Hare	57–80 km/h (35–50 mph)	Land	Hares can reach maximum speeds of 35 mph (56 km/h) in short distances of approximately 90 meters, and a top speed of 50 mph (80 km/h) for about 20 meters.
Lion	48–59 km/h (30–37 mph)	Land	Schaller (1972) estimated the lion's speed at 48–59 km/h, rejecting an earlier figure of 80 km/h as "too high". Film analysis of a hunting lioness by Sorkin (2008) recorded a running speed of 10.4 m/s (~37 km/h), and cites Elliott et al. (1977) for multiple lion hunts at 13.5 m/s (~49 km/h). GPS-IMU collar data from nine wild lions in Botswana (Wilson et al. 2018) show a commonly-used speed of 50 km/h (31 mph), with a maximum of 74 km/h (46 mph) recorded in only three individuals during a hunt.
Jackrabbit	58–72 km/h (36–45 mph) (Note: Estimates include 64 km/h (40 mph), 70 km/h (43 mph), and 72 km/h (45 mph) (some attribute this to the antelope jackrabbit, others to the white-tailed jackrabbit, and still others to jackrabbits in general.))	Land	The jackrabbit's strong hind legs allow it to leap 3 m (9.8 ft) in one bound; some can even reach 6 m (20 ft). Jackrabbits use a combination of leaps and zig-zags to outrun predators.
African wild dog	60–71 km/h (37–44 mph) (Note: Estimates include 66 km/h (41 mph) and 71 km/h (44 mph))	Land	When hunting, African wild dogs can sprint at 66 km/h (41 mph) in bursts, and they can maintain speeds of 56–60 km/h (35–37 mph) for up to 4.8 km (3 mi). Their targeted prey rarely escapes.
Kangaroo	50–71 km/h (31–44 mph) (Note: Estimates include "more than 30 miles per hour (48 kilometers per hour)" and 71 km/h (44 mph).)	Land	The comfortable hopping speed for a kangaroo is about 21–26 km/h (13–16 mph), but speeds of up to 71 km/h (44 mph) can be attained over short distances, while it can sustain a speed of 40 km/h (25 mph) for nearly 2 km (1.2 mi). The faster a kangaroo hops, the less energy it consumes (up to its cruising speed).
Greyhound (domestic dog)	60–70 km/h (37–43 mph) (Note: Estimates include 67 km/h (42 mph), 68.4 km/h (42.5 mph), and 69 km/h (43 mph).)	Land	Greyhounds are the fastest dogs, and have primarily been bred for coursing game and racing.
Onager	60–70 km/h (37–43 mph) (Note: Estimates include 64 km/h (40 mph), 69 km/h (43 mph) (specifically for the kulan subspecies), and 70 km/h (43 mph) (specifically for the Persian subspecies).)	Land	The onager consists of several subspecies, which most likely share the same ability to run at high speeds. Equids are noted for their extraordinary running endurance. An automobile first travelled 26 km (16 miles) at 48 km/h (30 mph) and then 6 km (4 miles) at 32 km/h (20 mph) following an onager, while the latter made changes in direction and speed during the chase. The onager covered a total of 47 km (29 miles).
Zebra	56–70 km/h (35–43 mph) (Note: Estimates include 35 mph (56 km/h) and 40 mph (64 km/h) for both the Grévy's zebra and Burchell's zebra.)	Land	Zebras have a home range anywhere between 11 and 232 sq mi (28 and 601 km^{2}) and they can travel 10 mi (16 km) a day while grazing. Estimated by observing the odometer when an animal ran at its maximum speed, alongside a vehicle on a road.
Eland	55–70 km/h (34–43 mph)	Land	Estimated by observing the odometer when an animal ran at its maximum speed, alongside a vehicle on a road.
Coyote	60–69 km/h (37–43 mph) (Note: Estimates include 64 km/h (39.8 mph), 64.4 km/h (40 mph), and 65 km/h (40 mph))	Land	Coyotes can easily reach 48 km/h (30 mph), and can sprint at 65 km/h (40 mph) when hunting. Even without a front foot, a coyote can still run at around 32 km/h (20 mph). Coyotes have reached 69 km/h (43 mph) over short distances as measured by observing the speedometer when a coyote ran alongside a vehicle.
Big brown bat	56–64 km/h (35–40 mph)	Flight	Big brown bats are reported to be one of the fastest bats reaching speeds of up to 40 mph.
Tiger	56–64 km/h (35–40 mph) (Note: Estimates include 40 mph (64 km/h))	Land	Tigers live in jungles, and have been recorded going anywhere from 30 mph (48 km/h) to 40 mph (64 km/h); much like the cheetah and lion, however, they only maintain this for a short burst.
Hyena	50–60 km/h (31–37 mph) (Note: Estimates include 30 mph (48 km/h), 25–31 mph (40–50 km/h) (specifically for the brown hyena) and 37 mph (60 km/h))	Land	The hyena can run up to 60 km/h (37 mph); some attribute this performance specifically to the spotted hyena. They use their speed to chase their prey, sometimes traveling 15 mi (24 km) in a single chase.
Giraffe	50–60 km/h (31–37 mph)	Land	Estimated by observing the odometer when an animal ran at its maximum speed, alongside a vehicle on a road.
African buffalo	50–56 km/h (31–35 mph)	Land	Estimated by observing the odometer when an animal ran at its maximum speed, alongside a vehicle on a road.
Orca	56 km/h (35 mph)	Swimming	Orcas are the fastest marine mammals. They can also reach speeds of up to 15.5 m/s (56 km/h; 35 mph).
Brown bear (Grizzly bear) American black bear	48–56 km/h (30–35 mph)	Land	Although it has been said anecdotally that grizzly bears (Ursus arctos horribilis) can run at 56 km/h, the maximum speed reliably recorded at Yellowstone is 48 km/h. It has been speculated that American black bears (Ursus americanus) can run at the same speed.
Black rhinoceros Indian rhinoceros	55 km/h (34 mph)	Land	They are very fast and can get up to speeds of 55 km/h running on their toes. Anecdotal reports suggest that it takes a very good horse to overtake a black rhinoceros. It has been suggested that a black rhinoceros can keep up with a horse for 1.6 km (1 mile). Indian rhinoceroses can also run at the same speed.
Sei whale	50–55 km/h (31–34 mph)	Swimming	It is among the fastest of all baleen whale, and can reach speeds of up to 50–55 km/h (31–34 mph) over short distances.
Warthog	48–55 km/h (30–34 mph)	Land	Estimated by observing the odometer when an animal ran at its maximum speed, alongside a vehicle on a road.
Fin whale	40–50 km/h (25–31 mph)	Swimming	Bursts up to 46–50 km/h (29–31 mph) have been recorded, earning the fin whale the nickname "the greyhound of the sea". The maximum speed measured by methods such as satellite tracking or GPS was 40 km/h (25 mph).
Blue whale	27–48 km/h (17–30 mph)	Swimming	Typically swims at 2–8 km/h (1.2–5.0 mph) but may swim faster at 32–48 km/h (20–30 mph) during encounters with boats, predators, or other individuals. In 2020, Paolo and his colleagues noted that if a large blue whale were to breach along a trajectory similar to that of a humpback whale, it would need to swim at a speed of 10.9 m/s (39 km/h; 24 mph) to achieve the same rate of surfacing; however, they argued that this would require approximately four times the energy and a higher power-to-mass ratio, making it unclear whether the blue whale could actually reach such speeds. They also noted that a blue whale in 'Racing' mode can momentarily reach speeds of approximately 7.5 m/s (27 km/h; 17 mph), which they considered the most accurate estimate of the maximum swimming speed a blue whale can achieve. The maximum speed derived from satellite tracking data was 5.3 m/s (19 km/h; 12 mph).
Human	Instantaneous: 44.35 km/h (27.56 mph) Sprinting (100 m): 37.58 km/h (23.35 mph) Long distance (marathon): 20.99 km/h (13.04 mph)	Land	Usain Bolt holds the 100 metre world record at 9.58 seconds. His absolute fastest speed during that sprint was 12.32 m/s (44.35 km/h; 27.56 mph) at 52.51 metres. The average speed of this race, including the brief reaction time immediately after the commencement of the race, was 10.44 m/s (37.58 km/h; 23.35 mph). At distances greater than 400 metres, the human body requires oxygen to sustain such paces, and speed significantly tapers at this point. The mile run world record is held by Josh Kerr with a time of 3:42.66, corresponding to 26.02 km/h (16.17 mph). The marathon world record is held by Sabastian Sawe with a time of 1:59:30, corresponding to 21.18 km/h (13.16 mph). In the absence of significant external factors, non-athletic humans tend to walk at about 1.4 m/s (5.0 km/h; 3.1 mph) and run at about 5.1 m/s (18 km/h; 11 mph). Although humans are capable of walking at speeds from nearly 0 m/s to upwards of 2.5 m/s (9.0 km/h; 5.6 mph) and running one mile (1.6 kilometers) in anywhere between 4–15 minutes, humans typically choose to use only a small range within these speeds. Compared to other land animals, humans are exceptionally capable of endurance—over very long distances, able to outrun almost every other species on land except certain dogs.
Pilot whale	41 km/h (25 mph)	Swimming	Pilot whale recorded a top speed of 11.3 m/s (41 km/h; 25 mph).
Pantropical spotted dolphin	40 km/h (25 mph)	Swimming	Pantropical spotted dolphin recorded a top speed of 11.1 m/s (40 km/h; 25 mph).
Wombat	40 km/h (25 mph)	Land	Wombats can maintain that speed for 150 metres (490 ft).
Common dolphin	33–37 km/h (21–23 mph)	Swimming	Common dolphins are the fastest marine mammals. When reaching their top speed, they take very short breaths. As an example, fin whales, which are much larger, can empty and refill their lungs in 2 seconds. Common dolphin recorded a top speed of 9.3–10.3 m/s (33–37 km/h; 21–23 mph).
Bottlenose dolphin	30–35 km/h (19–22 mph)	Swimming	Bottlenose dolphins typically swim at 5 to 11 km/h (1.4 to 3.1 m/s), but are capable of bursts of up to 30 to 35 km/h (8.3 to 9.7 m/s). The higher speeds can only be sustained for a short time.
Sperm whale	25–35 km/h (16–22 mph)	Swimming	Sperm whales can swim at speeds of up to 7.0–9.6 meters per second (25–35 km/h; 16–21 mph).
Antarctic minke whale	30 km/h (19 mph)	Swimming	In a 2019 collaborative study involving scholars from around the world, various types of whales, including humpback whales, blue whales, fin whales, Bryde's whales, and Antarctic minke whales, were tracked for four years to investigate changes in migration patterns based on size. When all results were finalized, most whales swam at an average speed of 1.9 m/s (6.8 km/h; 4.3 mph), but one Antarctic minke whale recorded a top speed of 8.3 m/s (30 km/h; 19 mph).
Hippopotamus	30 km/h (19 mph)	Land	Hippos are reported to reach 30 km/h (19 mph) but this has not been confirmed.
False killer whale	26.9–30 km/h (16.7–18.6 mph)	Swimming	A pod near Chile had a 15 km/h (9.3 mph) cruising speed, and false killer whales in captivity were recorded to have a maximum speed of 7.46 m/s (26.9 km/h; 16.7 mph), similar to a bottlenose dolphin. The speed of a pod of false killer whales was reported to be about 30 km/h (19 mph).
Common minke whale	20–30 km/h (12–19 mph)	Swimming	The maximum speed measured by methods such as satellite tracking or GPS was 20–30 km/h (12–19 mph).
Humpback whale	27 km/h (17 mph)	Swimming	The species is a slower swimmer than other rorquals, cruising at 7.9–15.1 km/h (4.9–9.4 mph). When threatened, a humpback may speed up to 27 km/h (17 mph).
Asian elephant	25 km/h (16 mph)	Land	Fast-moving elephants appear to 'run' with their front legs, but 'walk' with their hind legs and can reach a top speed of 25 km/h (16 mph).
Raccoon	16–24 km/h (9.9–14.9 mph)	Land	Their top speed over short distances is 16 to 24 km/h (9.9 to 14.9 mph).
Bowhead whale	10–22.7 km/h (6.2–14.1 mph)	Swimming	It is a slow swimmer, normally travelling around 2–5 km/h (0.56–1.39 m/s; 1.2–3.1 mph). When fleeing from danger, it can travel at a speed of 10 km/h (2.8 m/s; 6.2 mph). The maximum speed measured by methods such as satellite tracking or GPS was 22.7 km/h (14.1 mph).
African elephant	21 km/h (13 mph)	Land	One elephant, being chased by another, reached a speed of 5.9 meters per second (21 km/h; 13 mph). Anecdotal reports of elephants outpacing humans in sprint races may stem from humans who were taken by surprise by an attacking animal and did not have time to react appropriately, not the fact that the elephants truly overtook a human running at top speed.
Right whale	9.3 km/h (5.8 mph)	Swimming	Right whales swim slowly, reaching only 5 kn (9.3 km/h) at top speed.

== See also ==
- Speed record
