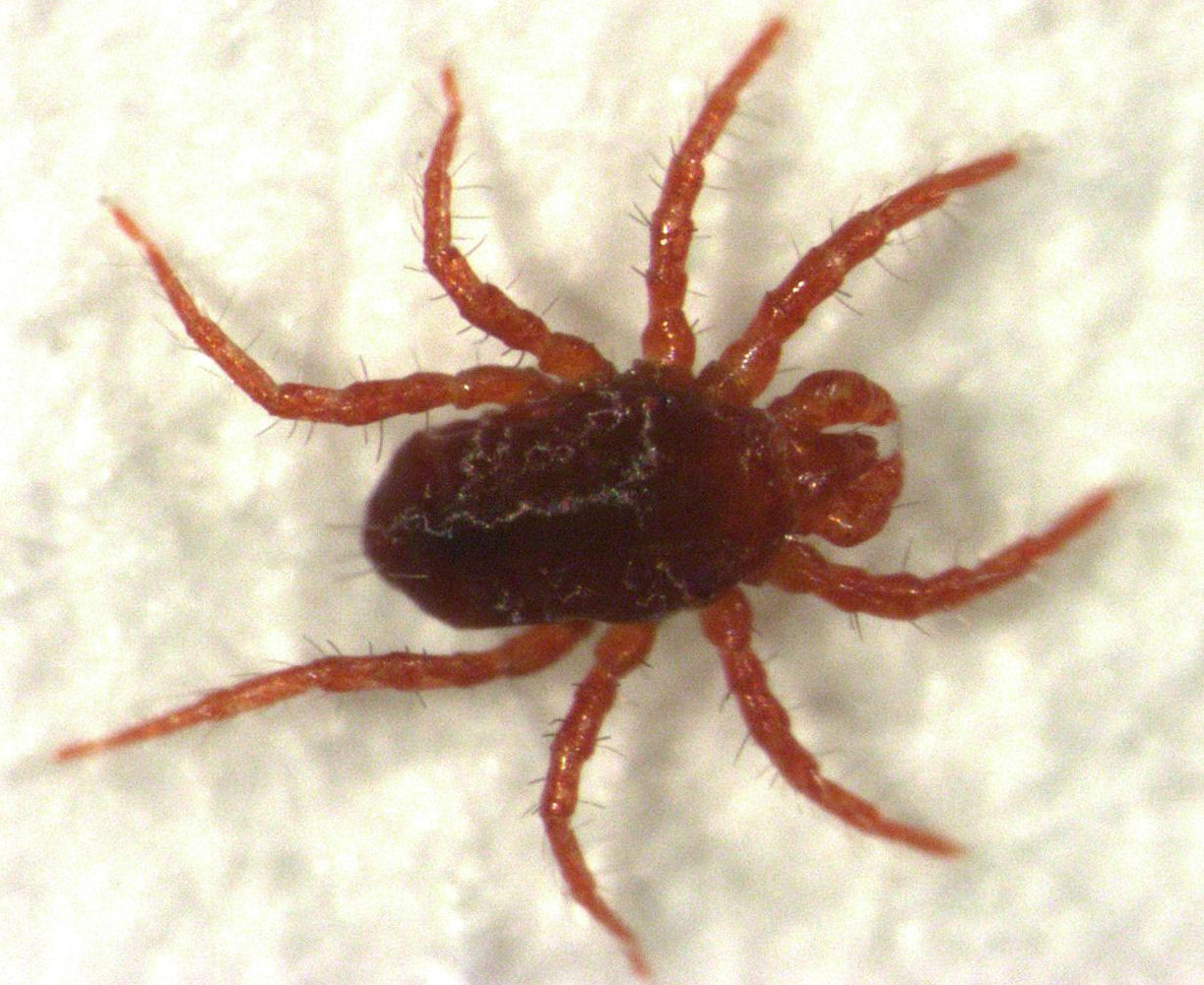

Scientific classification
- Kingdom: Animalia
- Phylum: Arthropoda
- Subphylum: Chelicerata
- Class: Arachnida
- Order: Trombidiformes
- Suborder: Prostigmata
- Infraorder: Anystina
- Superfamily: Anystoidea
- Family: Teneriffiidae; Thor, 1911

= Teneriffiidae =

Teneriffiidae Temporal range: Palaeogene–present

Family of mites

Teneriffiidae is a family of mites in the order Trombidiformes. There are at least four genera in Teneriffiidae.

== Genera ==
These four genera belong to the family Teneriffiidae:

- Austroteneriffia Womersley, 1935
- Chulacarus
- Mesoteneriffia Irk, 1939
- Teneriffia Thor, 1911
