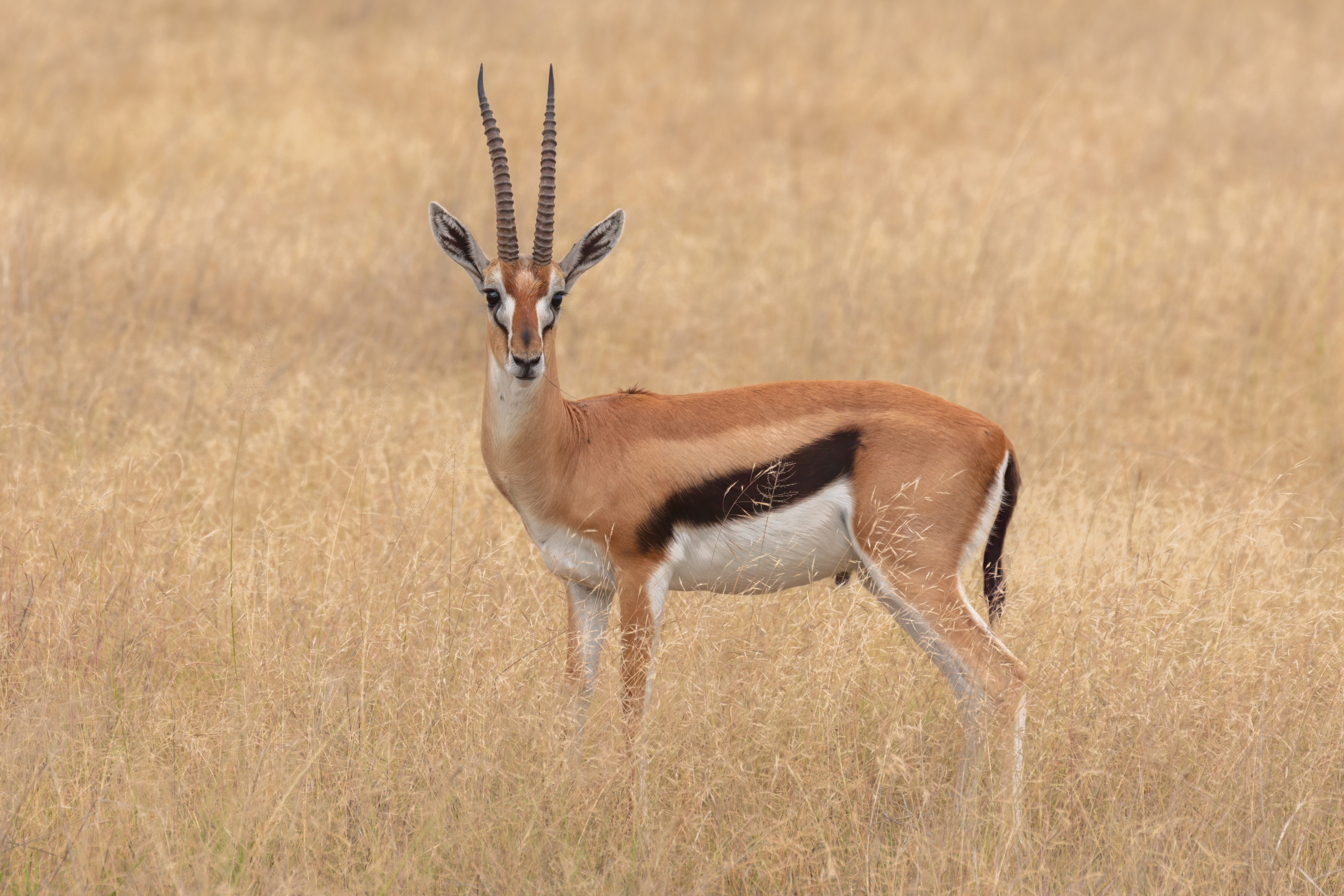
- Male E. t. thomsonii Amboseli National Park, Kenya
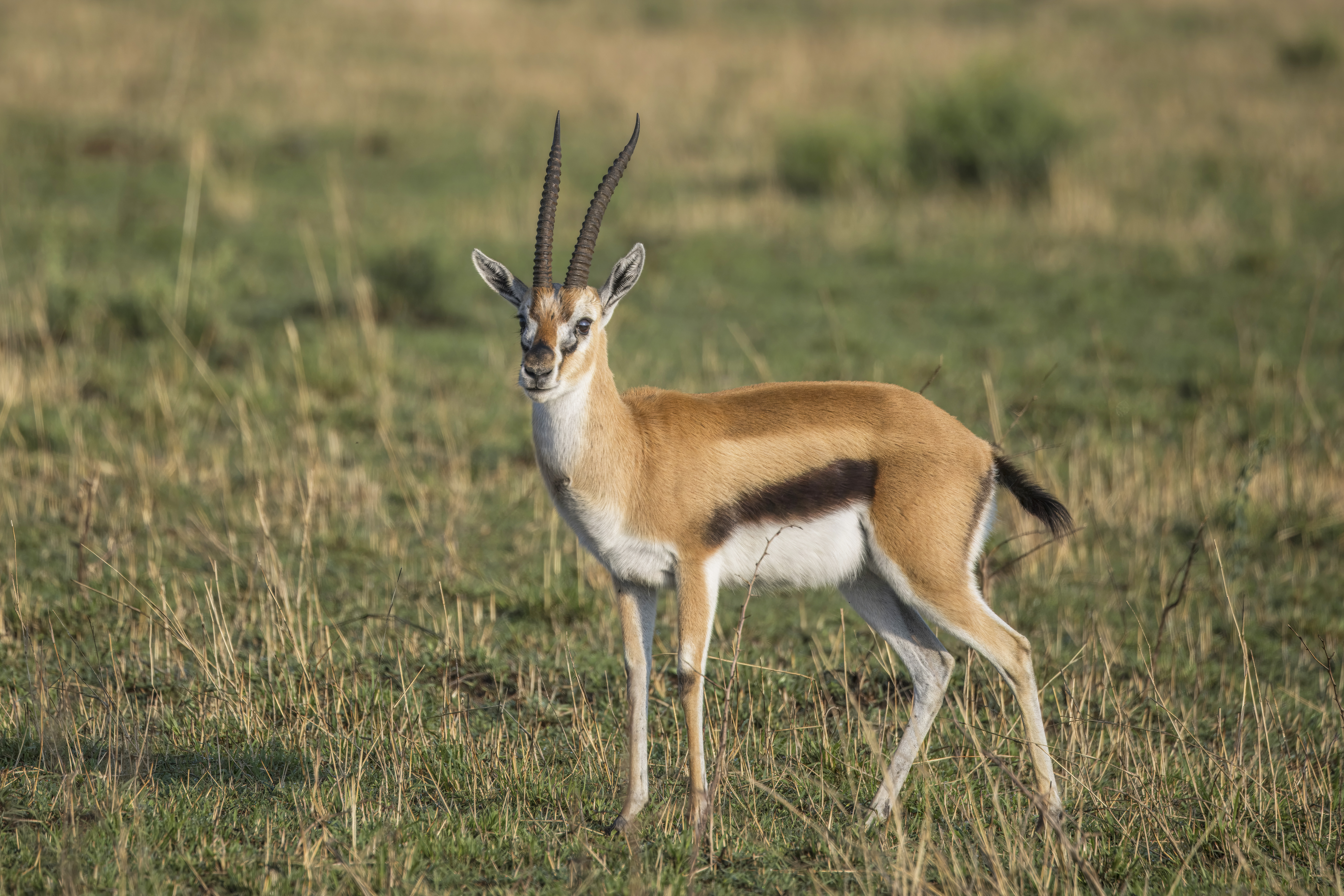
- Male E. t. nasalis Serengeti National Park, Tanzania

Conservation status
- Least Concern (IUCN 3.1)

Scientific classification
- Kingdom: Animalia
- Phylum: Chordata
- Class: Mammalia
- Order: Artiodactyla
- Family: Bovidae
- Subfamily: Antilopinae
- Genus: Eudorcas
- Species: E. thomsonii

Binomial name
- Eudorcas thomsonii (Günther, 1884)
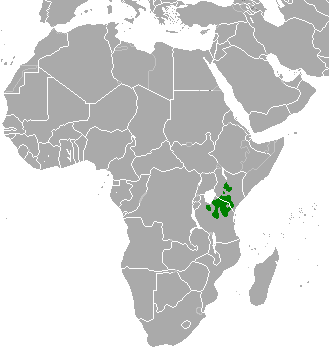
- Distribution range

= Thomson's gazelle =

Thomson gazelle

Species of gazelle

Thomson's gazelle (Eudorcas thomsonii) is one of the best known species of gazelles. It is named after explorer Joseph Thomson and is sometimes referred to as a "tommie". It is considered by some to be a subspecies of the red-fronted gazelle and was formerly considered a member of the genus Gazella within the subgenus Eudorcas, before Eudorcas was elevated to genus status.

Thomson's gazelles can be found in numbers exceeding 200,000 in Africa and are recognized as the most common type of gazelle in East Africa. A small antelope, the Thomson's gazelle is one of the fastest land animals, with estimated speeds up to 80 km/h (50 mph). Its main predator is the cheetah.

== Taxonomy and etymology ==
The current scientific name of Thomson's gazelle is Eudorcas thomsonii. It is a member of the genus Eudorcas and is classified under the family Bovidae. Thomson's gazelle was first described by British zoologist Albert Günther in 1884. The relationships between Thomson's gazelle and the congeneric Mongalla gazelle (E. albonotata) remain disputed; while some authors such as Alan W. Gentry of the (Natural History Museum, London) consider the Mongalla gazelle to be a subspecies of Thomson's gazelle, others (such as Colin Groves) consider the Mongalla gazelle to be a full species. Zoologist Jonathan Kingdon treated Heuglin's gazelle, sometimes considered a species of Eudorcas (E. tilonura) or a subspecies of the red-fronted gazelle (E. r. tilonura), as a subspecies of Thomson's gazelle. Thomson's gazelle is named after the Scottish explorer Joseph Thomson; the first recorded use of the name dates to 1897. Another common name for the gazelle is "tommy".

- - - - Gazella
      - Blackbuck (Antilope cervicapra)
    - - Eudorcas
        - Red-fronted gazelle (Eudorcas rufifrons)
        - Thomson's gazelle (E. thomsonii)
      - Nanger
        - - Soemmerring's gazelle (Nanger soemmerringii)
          - Grant's gazelle (N. granti)
        - Dama gazelle (N. dama)
  - - Gerenuk (Litocranius walleri)
    - Springbok (Antidorcas marsupialis)

Antilope, Eudorcas, Gazella, and Nanger form a clade within their tribe Antilopini. A 1999 phylogenetic analysis showed that Antilope is the closest sister taxon to Gazella, although the earliest phylogeny, proposed in 1976, placed Antilope as sister to Nanger. In a more recent revision of the phylogeny of the Antilopini on the basis of nuclear and mitochondrial data in 2013, Eva Verena Bärmann (of the University of Cambridge) and colleagues constructed a cladogram that clearly depicted the close relationship between Nanger and Eudorcas. Antilope and Gazella were found to have a similar relationship.

Two subspecies are identified:

- E. t. nasalis (Lönnberg, 1908) – Serengeti Thomson's gazelle ranges from the Serengeti to the Kenya Rift Valley.
- E. t. thomsonii (Günther, 1884) – eastern Thomson's gazelle ranges from east of the Rift Valley in Kenya and Tanzania, southward to Arusha District (Tanzania) and then southwestward to Lake Eyasi, Wembere River, and Shinyanga.

== Description ==
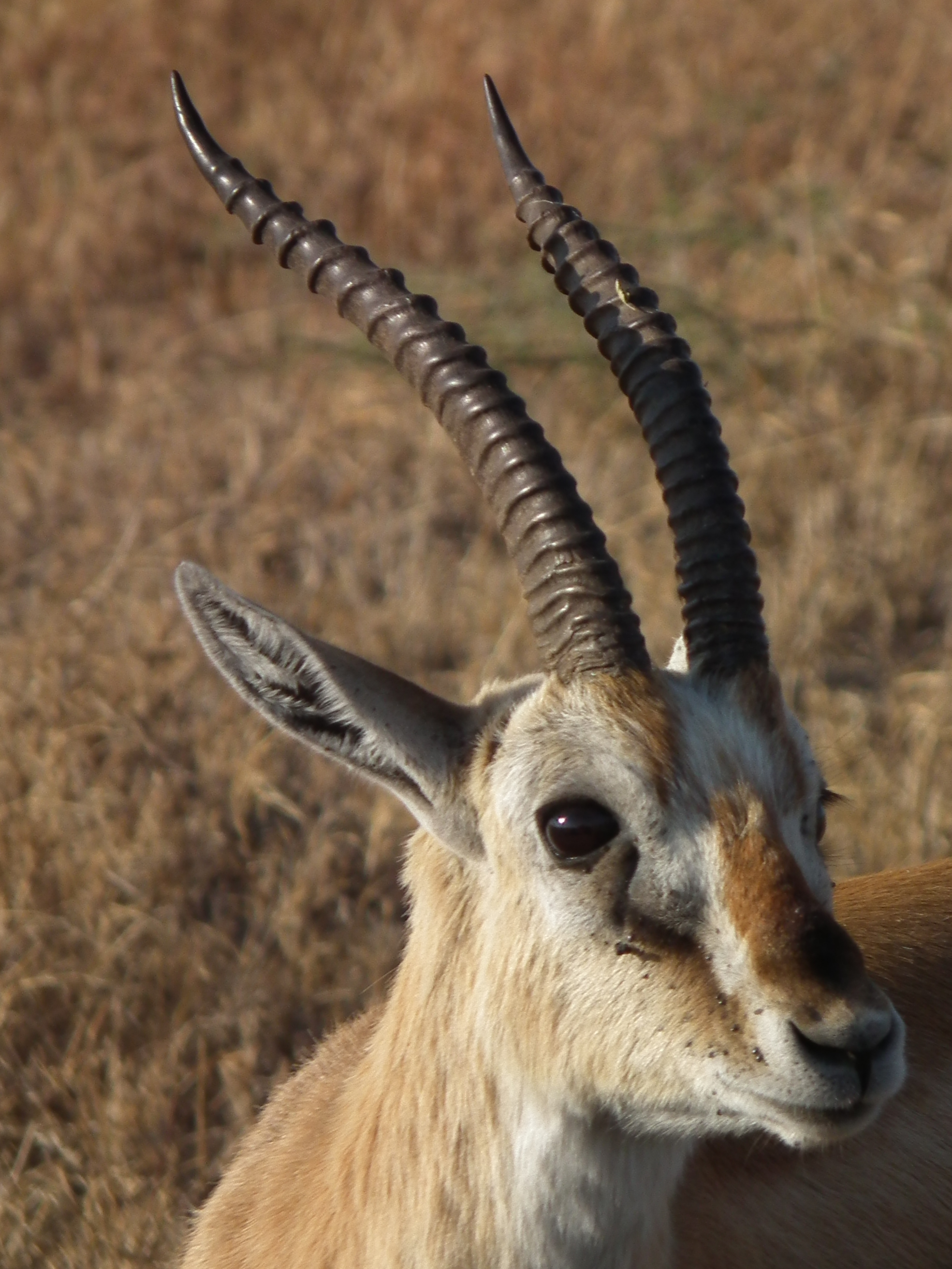
Males' horns are thicker and longer than females.

Thomson's gazelle is a relatively small gazelle; it stands 60–70 cm (24–28 in) at the shoulder. Males weigh 20–35 kg (44–77 lb), while the slightly lighter females weigh 15–25 kg (33–55 lb). Facial characteristics of the gazelle include white rings around the eyes, black stripes running from a corner of the eye to the nose, rufous stripes running from the horns to the nose, a dark patch on the nose, and a light forehead.

The coat is sandy brown to rufous; a black band runs across the flanks, from the upper foreleg to just above the upper hind leg. A buff band occurs above the black stripe. Short, black streaks mark the white rump. The black tail measures 15–27 cm (5.9–10.6 in). Males have well-developed preorbital glands near the eyes, which are used for scent-marking territories. Both sexes possess horns that curve slightly backward with the tips facing forward. The horns, highly ringed, measure 25–43 cm (9.8–16.9 in) in males and 7–15 cm (2.8–5.9 in) in females. However, females have more fragile horns; some are even hornless. Grant's gazelle is very similar to Thomson's gazelle, but can be differentiated by its larger size and the white patch on the rump extending top over the tail.

The two subspecies differ in their appearance. The eastern Thomson's gazelle is the larger of the two, with fainter facial markings. The Serengeti Thomson's gazelle has a whiter face with more conspicuous markings. The horns of females are shorter than those of males to a greater degree in the eastern Thomson's gazelle and the horns are more divergent in the eastern Thomson gazelle.

== Ecology ==
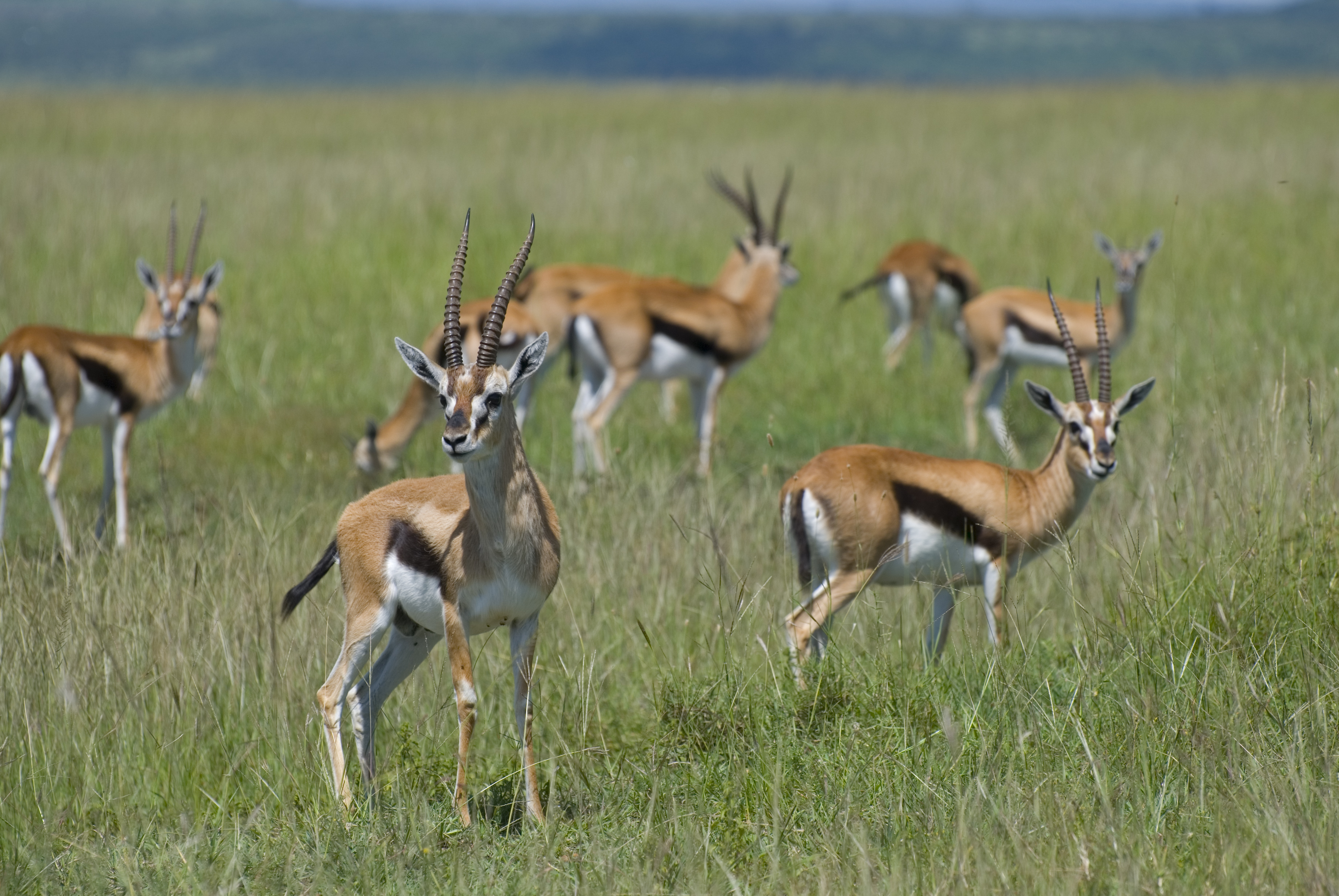
Gazelle herd

Thomson's gazelle lives in East Africa, in the savannas and grassland habitats of Kenya and Tanzania. It is particularly prevalent in the Serengeti region. It has narrow habitat preferences, preferring short grassland with dry, sturdy foundation. It does, however, migrate into tall grassland and dense woodland. Gazelles are mixed feeders. In the wet seasons, they eat mainly fresh grasses, but during the dry seasons, they eat more browse, particularly foliage and seeds from woody plants, bushes and herbaceous forbs in the genera Acacia, Balanites, Boscia, Sida and Solanum.

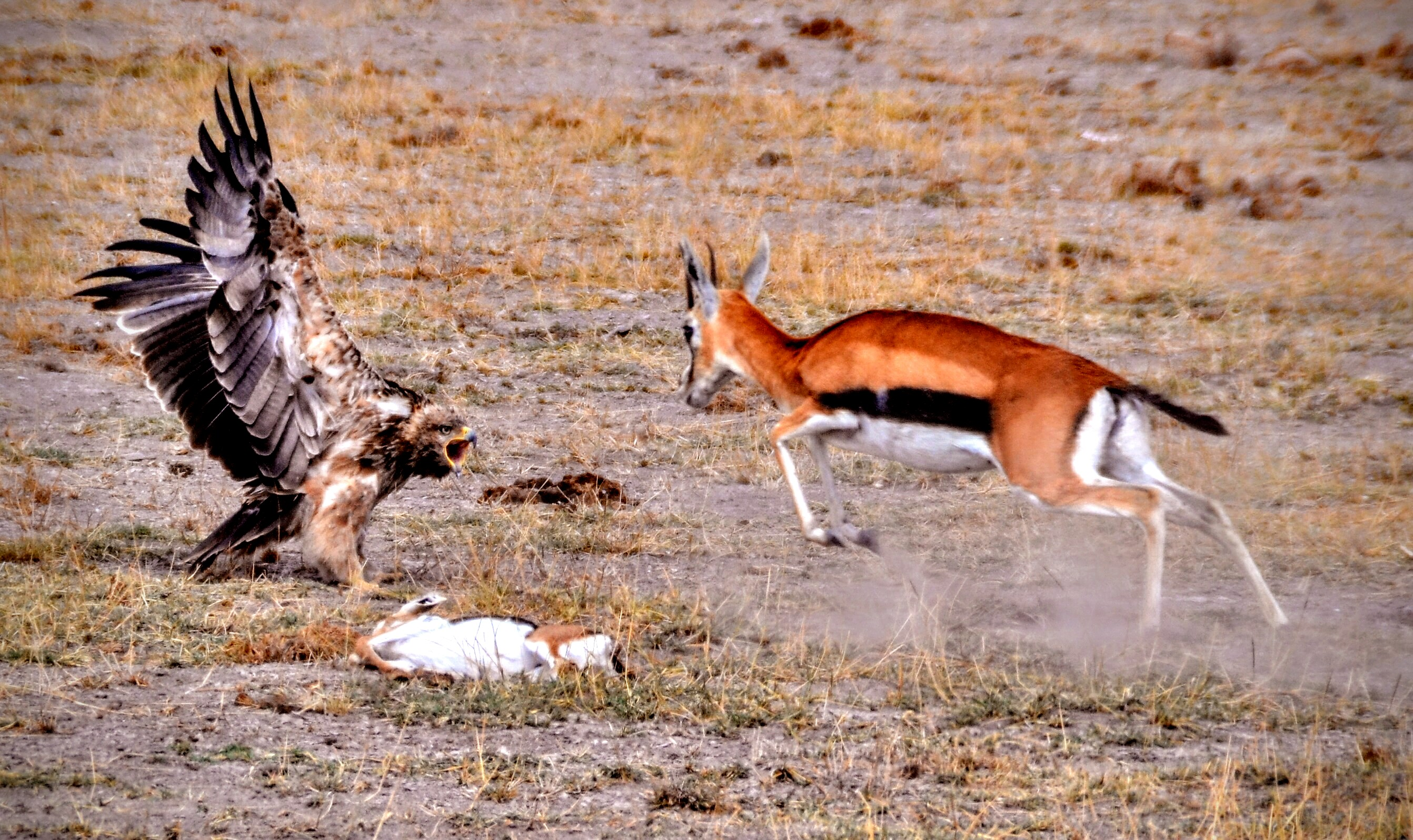
Doe defending dead fawn from eastern imperial eagle

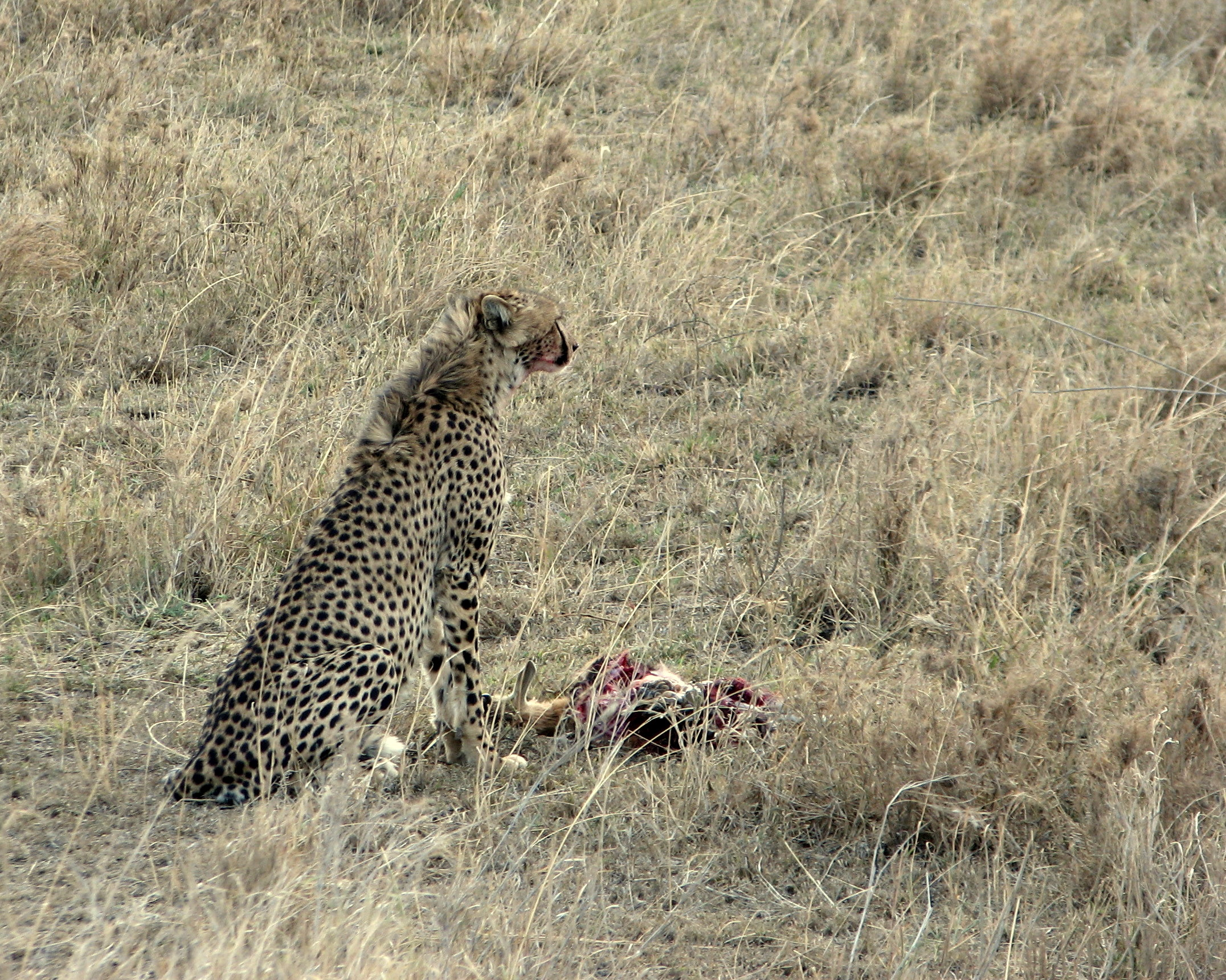
A cheetah with a Thomson's gazelle carcass. Cheetahs are the main predators of Thomson's gazelle.

Thomson's gazelles are dependent on short grass, preferring Cynodon, Harpachne and Themeda species. Their numbers can be highly concentrated at the beginning of the rains when the grass grows quickly. In the Serengeti, they follow the larger herbivores, such as plains zebras and blue wildebeests as they mow down the taller grasses. In the wild, Thomson's gazelles can live 10–15 years. Their major predators are cheetahs, which are able to attain higher speeds, but gazelles can outlast them in long chases and are able to make turns more quickly. This small antelope can run extremely fast, up to 80 km/h (50 mph), and zigzag, an adaptation which often saves it from predators. Sometimes, they are also taken by leopards, lions, African wild dogs, hyenas, Nile crocodiles and African rock pythons, and their fawns are sometimes the prey of eagles, jackals, and baboons. A noticeable behaviour of Thomson's gazelles is their bounding leap, known as stotting or pronking, used to startle predators and display strength.

== Social behavior ==
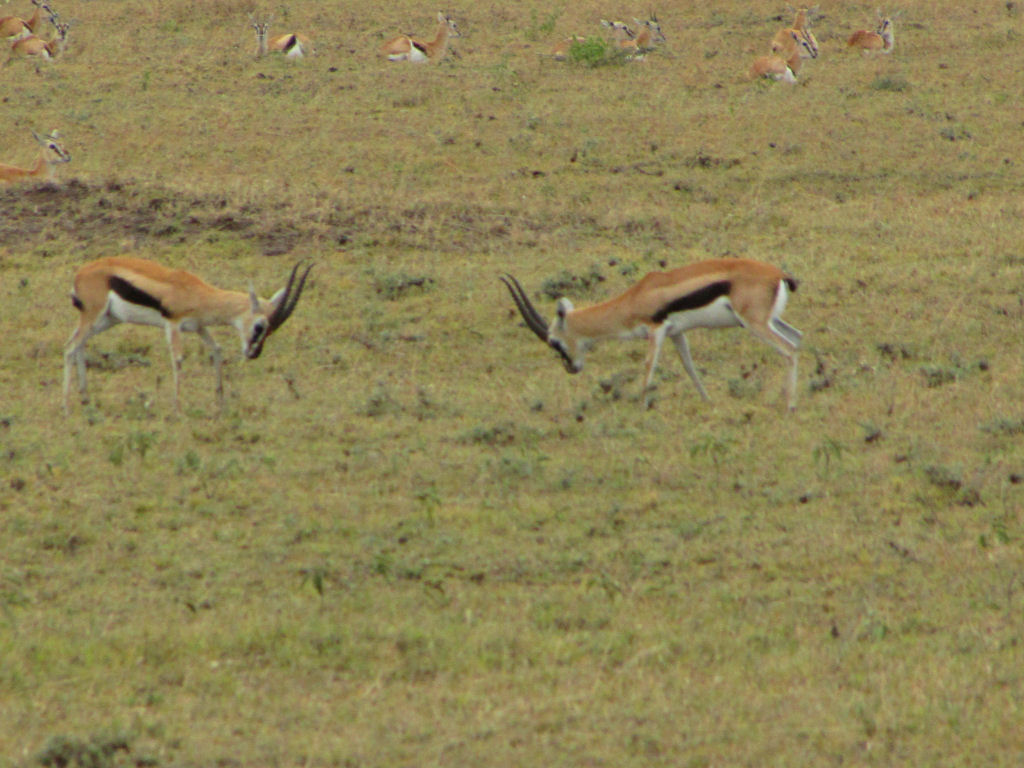
Two male gazelles in an agonistic display with females nearby

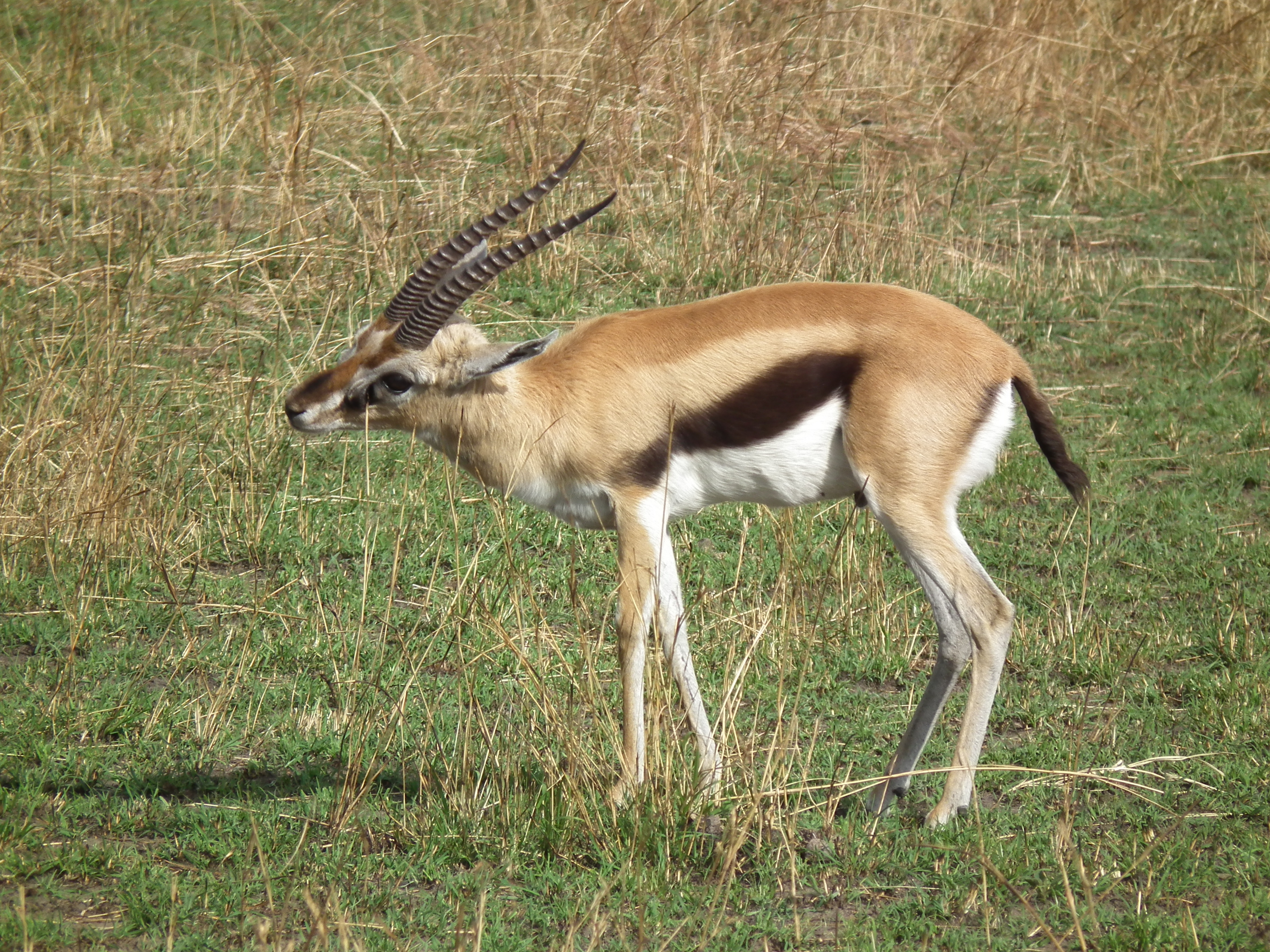
Gazelle marking grass with its preorbital gland

During the wet season, a time when grass is abundant, adult male gazelles graze extensively. They spread out more and establish breeding territories. Younger males usually spend their time in bachelor groups, and are prevented from entering the territories. Females form migratory groups that enter the males' territories, mostly the ones with the highest-quality resources. As the female groups pass through and forage, the territorial males may try to herd them, and are usually successful in preventing single females from leaving, but not whole groups. Subadult males usually establish dominance through actual combat, while adults are more likely to do rituals. If a bachelor male should be passing through a territorial male's region, the male will chase the offender out of his territory.

When patrolling his territory, a male may use his horns to gore the grass, soil, or a bush. Males also mark grass stems with their preorbital glands, which emit a dark secretion. Territories of different males may share a boundary. When territorial males meet at the border of their territories, they engage in mock fights in which they rush towards each other as if they are about to clash, but without touching. After this, they graze in a frontal position, then in parallel and then in reverse, and move away from each other while constantly grazing. These rituals have no victor, but merely maintain the boundaries of the territories. Territorial males usually do not enter another male's territory. If a male is chasing an escaping female, he will stop the chase if she runs into another territory, but the neighboring male will continue the chase.

== Reproduction and parental care ==
A male gazelle follows a female and sniffs her urine to find out if she is in estrus, a process known as the Flehmen response. If so, he continues to court and mount her. Females leave the herd to give birth to single fawns after a five- to six-month gestation period. Breeding takes place year-round, with a peak in births around January/February, and in some populations a second peak around June/July. Newborn fawns weigh 2 to 3 kg (4.4 to 6.6 lb). Mother gazelles give birth twice yearly with one or two fawns. When giving birth, a female gazelle crouches as the newborn fawn drops to the ground, tearing the umbilical cord. The mother then licks the fawn clean of amniotic fluid and tissues. In addition, licking possibly also serves to stimulate the fawn's blood circulation, or to "label" it so its mother can recognize it by scent.

In the first six hours of the fawn's life, it moves and rests with its mother, but eventually spends more time away from its mother or hides in the grass. The mother stays in the vicinity of the fawn and returns to nurse it daily. Mother and fawn may spend an hour together before the fawn goes and lies back down to wait for the next nursing. Mother gazelles may associate with other gazelle mothers, but the fawns do not gather into "kindergartens". Mothers defend their young against jackals and baboons, but not against larger predators. Sometimes, a female can fend off a male baboon by headbutting him with her horns to defend her fawn.

Females exhibit pre-retrieval peaks in maternal vigilance. This behavior is conspicuous. Females all but cease other activities in favor of vigilance. They move slowly in the direction of the fawn's hiding spot, stopping frequently to scan the environment. Several females in our observations engaged in "sham" feeding behavior, in which they lowered their heads to the ground as if to feed before quickly raising them back up to scan. In one instance, a female appeared to actively search for predators by climbing to the top of a slight hill to scan prior to approaching her fawn's hiding spot.

As the fawn approaches two months of age, it spends more time with its mother and less time hiding. Eventually, it stops hiding. Around this time, the fawn starts eating solid food, but continues to nurse from its mother. The pair also joins a herd. Young female gazelles may associate with their mothers as yearlings. Young males may also follow their mothers, but as they reach adolescence, they are noticed by territorial males, so cannot follow their mothers into territories. The mother may follow and stay with him, but eventually stops following him when he is driven away; the male will then join a bachelor group.

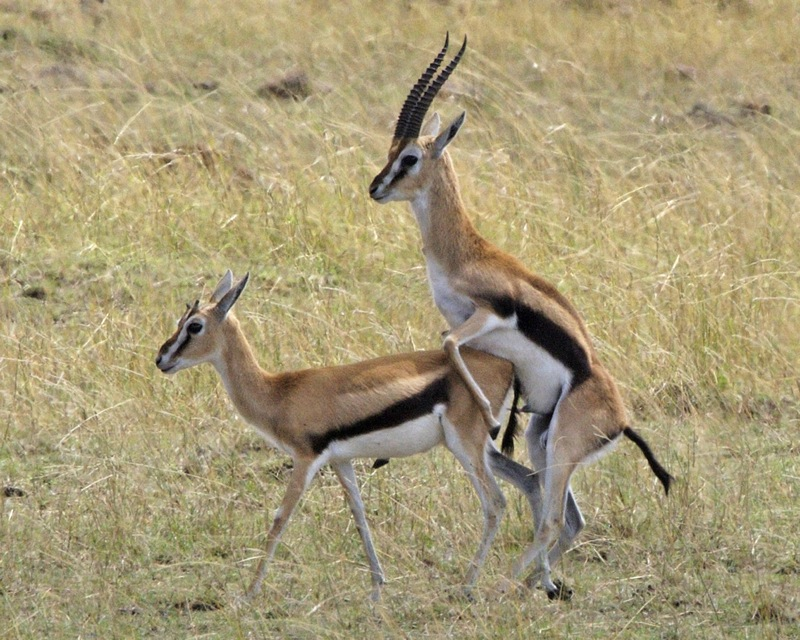
Male gazelle mounting a female

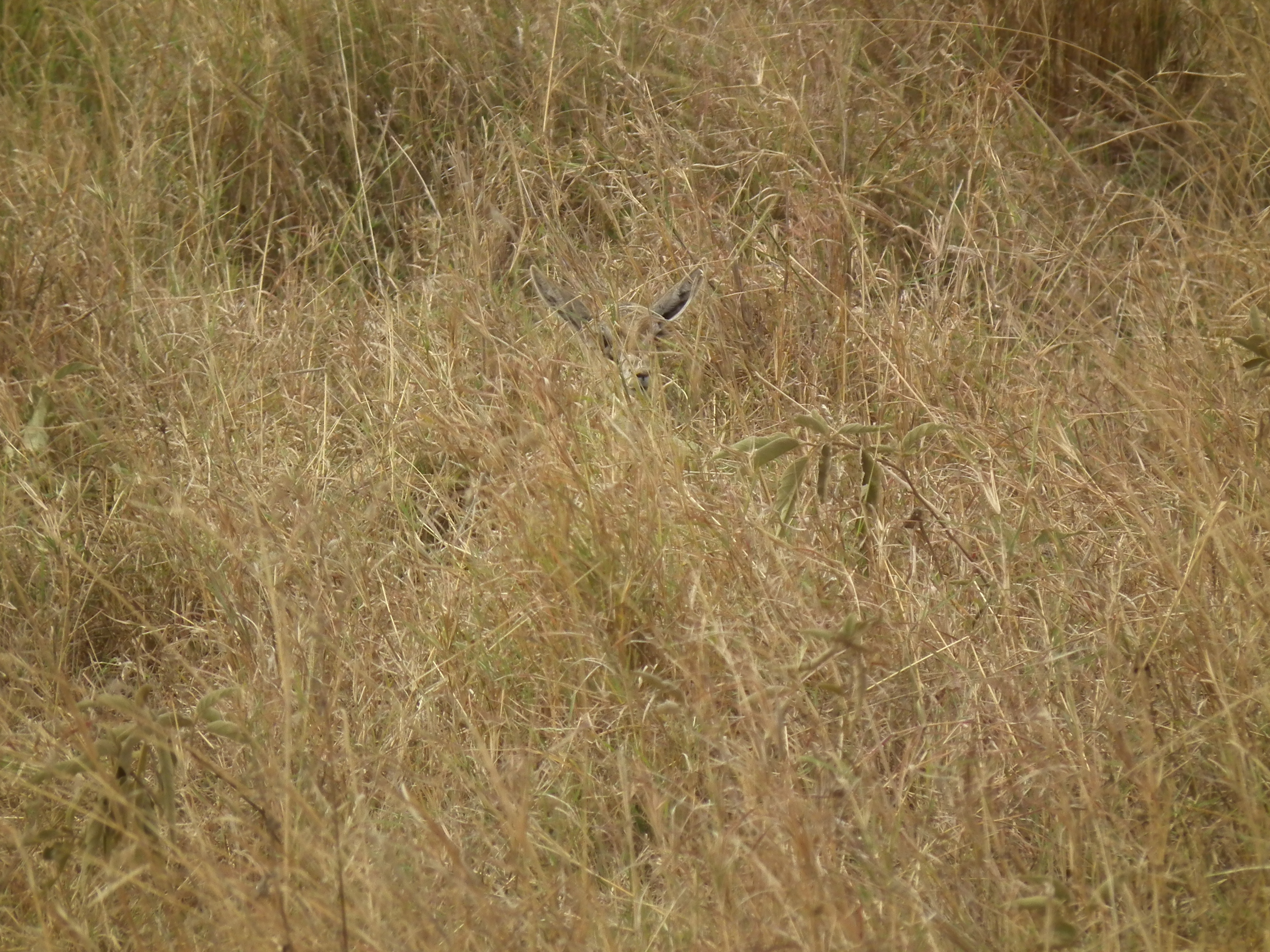
Fawn hiding in the grass

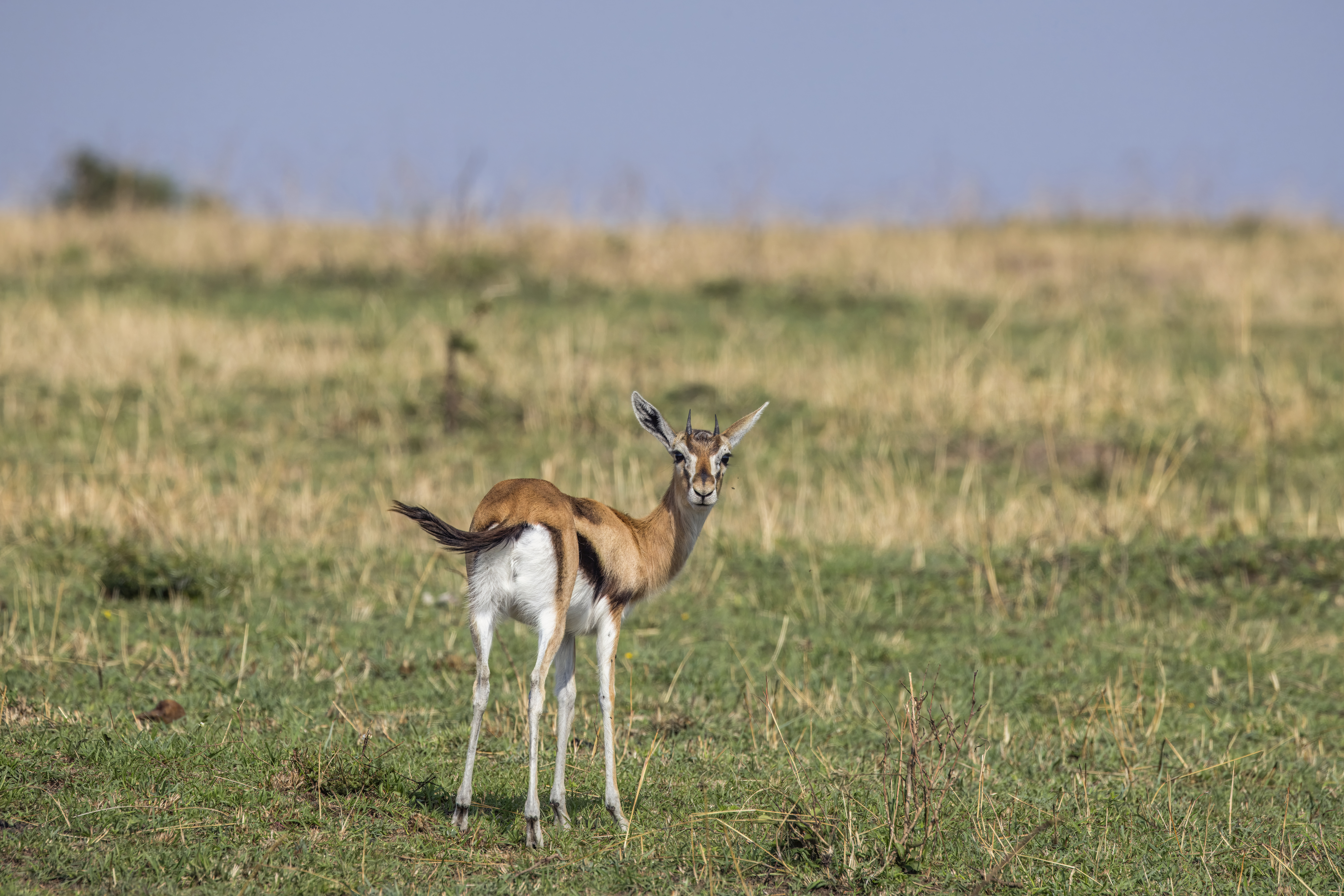
Juvenile male

== Physiological adaptations ==
In an experiment studying the effects of dehydration and heat stress on food intake and dry matter digestibility, Thomson's gazelle exhibited metabolic adaptations for desert environments. When exposed to heat stress alone, neither the food intake nor digestion of Thomson's gazelle was affected. Compared to some other East African ruminant species that did change their food intake and digestion in response to heat stress, Thomson's gazelle appears relatively well-adapted to periodic heat stress. However, Thomson's gazelle is a water-dependent species, and when exposed to dehydration, its food intake decreased. Food intake was further depressed when gazelles were exposed to dehydration in addition to heat stress. Some of this reduction can be attributed to decreased metabolism, which can help the animals conserve water. In another study comparing Thomson's gazelles and Grant's gazelles in foraging and behaviors to avoid predators, it was found that Thomson's gazelle adjusted its diet during drought to eat more trees and shrubs of Acacia species rather than undigestible dried grasses. Acacia species are high in tannins, anti-nutritional factors that can decrease metabolic performance. However, gazelles appear to have the ability to detoxify and metabolize some tannins and moderate levels of condensed tannins may even be beneficial to ruminants by increasing amino acid absorption in the gut.

== Status ==
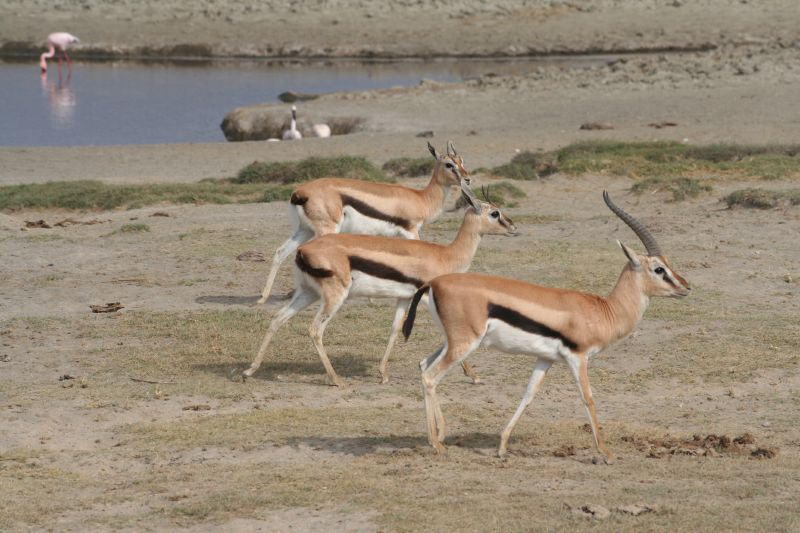
Male gazelle with females

The population estimate is around 550,000. The population had declined 60% from 1978 to 2005. Threats to Thomson's gazelles are habitat modification, fire management, and road development. Surveys have reported steep declines (60–70%) over periods of about 20 years dating from the late 1970s in several places, including the main strongholds for the species: Serengeti, Masai Mara, and Ngorongoro.

== Cultural references ==
References to the Thomson's gazelle were an occasional running gag in Monty Python's Flying Circus.

The 2016 Disney film Zootopia features an anthropomorphic Thomson's gazelle pop star, voiced by Shakira.

The Thomson's gazelle served as the inspiration for Alexander McQueen's 1997 Autumn/Winter collection, "It's a Jungle Out There".

== See also ==
- Grant's gazelle
- Red-fronted gazelle
- Springbok, a visibly similar species
- Impala
