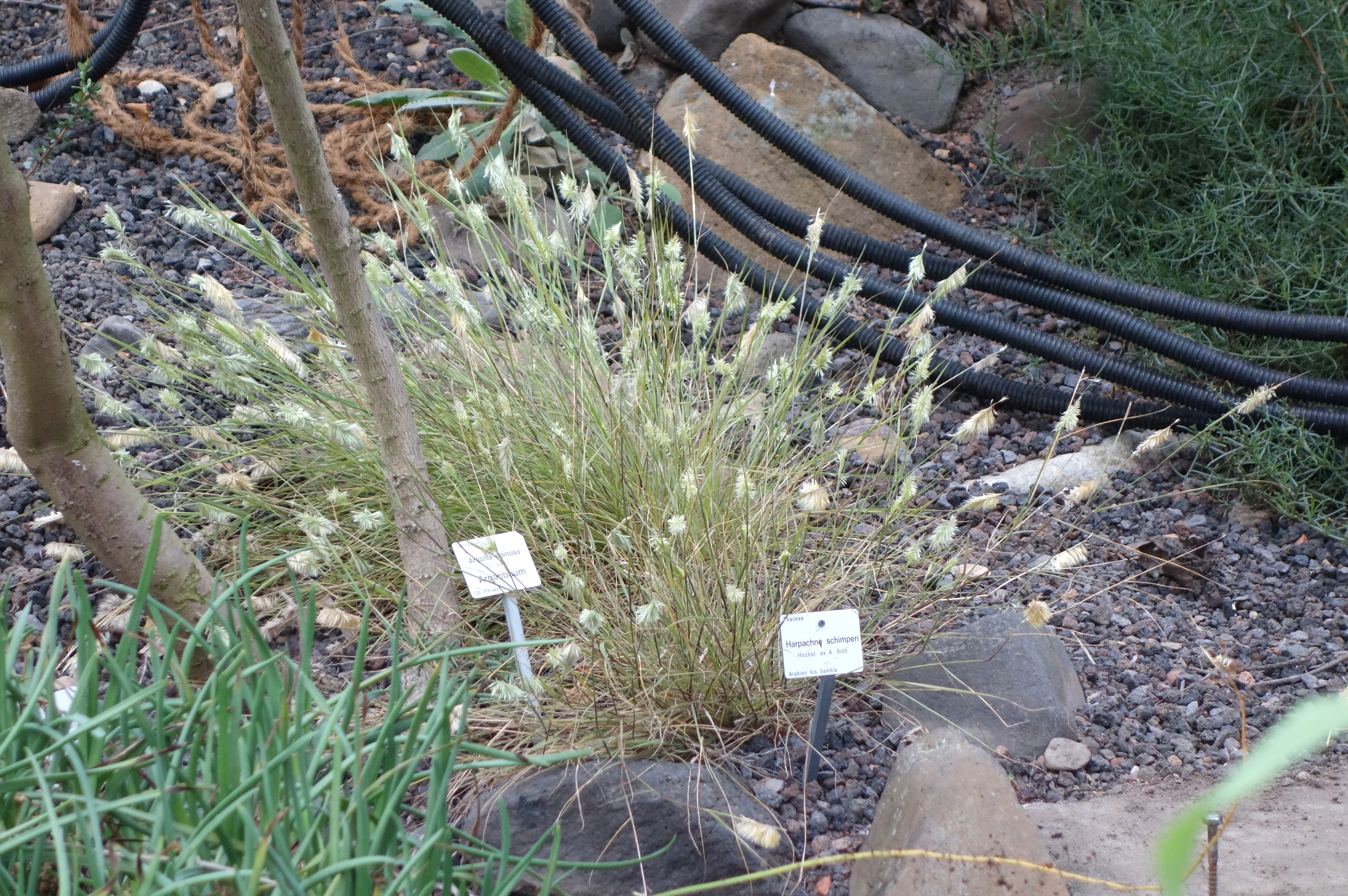

Scientific classification
- Kingdom: Plantae
- Clade: Tracheophytes
- Clade: Angiosperms
- Clade: Monocots
- Clade: Commelinids
- Order: Poales
- Family: Poaceae
- Subfamily: Chloridoideae
- Genus: Harpachne
- Species: H. schimperi

Binomial name
- Harpachne schimperi Hochst. ex A. Rich.

= Harpachne schimperi =

Species of grass

Harpachne schimperi is a species of grass in the true grass family (Poaceae), found from Ethiopia and Sudan south to Zambia. It grows in dense tufts up to 40 cm high, with oblong panicles 4–7.5 cm long and dense spikelets.

== Habitat ==
The grass grows in open woodlands, dry grassland, disturbed regions, and waste grounds, frequently form large colonies.
