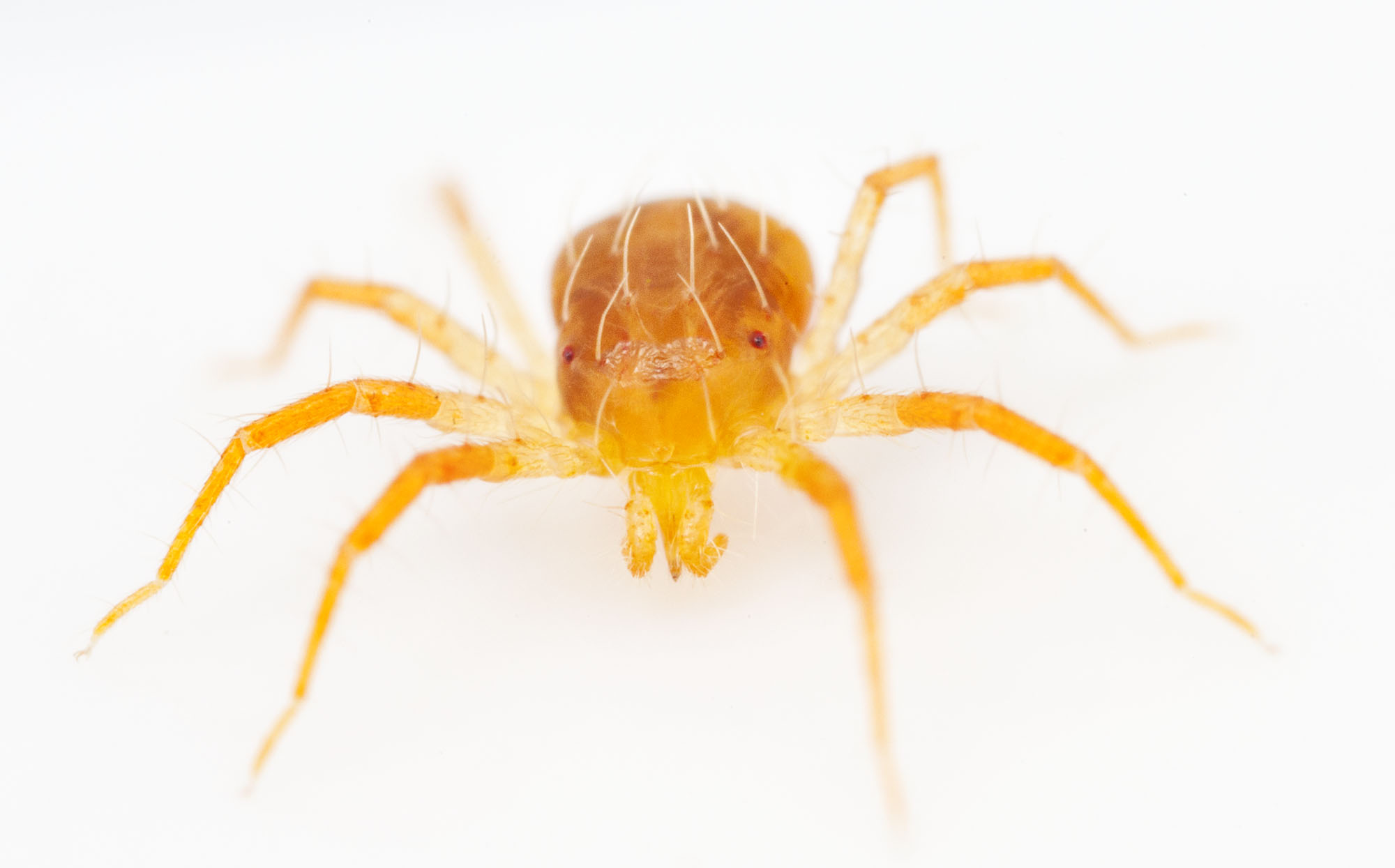
- Anystis baccarum

Scientific classification
- Kingdom: Animalia
- Phylum: Arthropoda
- Subphylum: Chelicerata
- Class: Arachnida
- Order: Trombidiformes
- Family: Anystidae
- Genus: Anystis von Heyden, 1826

= Anystis =

Anystis Temporal range: Cretaceous–present

Genus of mites

Anystis (whirligig mites) is a genus of mites. They are predatory on other mites and small insects. Species in this genus are often red, long-legged, and range in size from 500μm – 1500μm. Both the genus and the family Anystidae are referred to as whirligig mites.

== Identification ==
Members of the genus have broad and short bodies (almost trapezoidal) with two pairs of eyes. They have a prodorsal shield – the large covering on the anterior of the body – which is indented posteriorly (kidney-shaped). Two pairs of eyes are located posteriorly and laterally to the prodorsal shield. From the shield arise two long pairs of hair-like setae and a pair of similarly shaped sensory organs (sensilla). Another pair of sensilla are found on the anterior portion of the mite's main body, the idiosoma. The chelicerae, specialized mouthparts, each have a pair of hook-shaped chela on the distal portion and a pair of setae as well. The tarsus, the last segment of the leg, ends in two claws (which may be (combed, toothed or pilose) and has a claw- or bell-like empodium (a structure between the claws).

== Agricultural use ==
The species Anystis baccarum has been used as a form of biological pest control in apple orchards due to their predation of Panonychus ulmi, a mite species that causes massive economic loss in apple trees. Though A. baccarum is the most well known and exemplary member of the genus, it is unknown if other species may be able to fill a similar role to it in terms of pest control.

== Species ==
Species include:

- Anystis agilis
- Anystis andrei
- Anystis baccarum
- Anystis berlesi
- Anystis borussica
- Anystis coccinea
- Anystis cornigerum
- Anystis cursorium
- Anystis germanica
- Anystis pallescens
- Anystis pini
- Anystis rabuscula
- Anystis salicinus
- Anystis sellnicki
- Anystis triangularis
- Anystis vitis
- Anystis voigtsi
- Anystis wallacei
