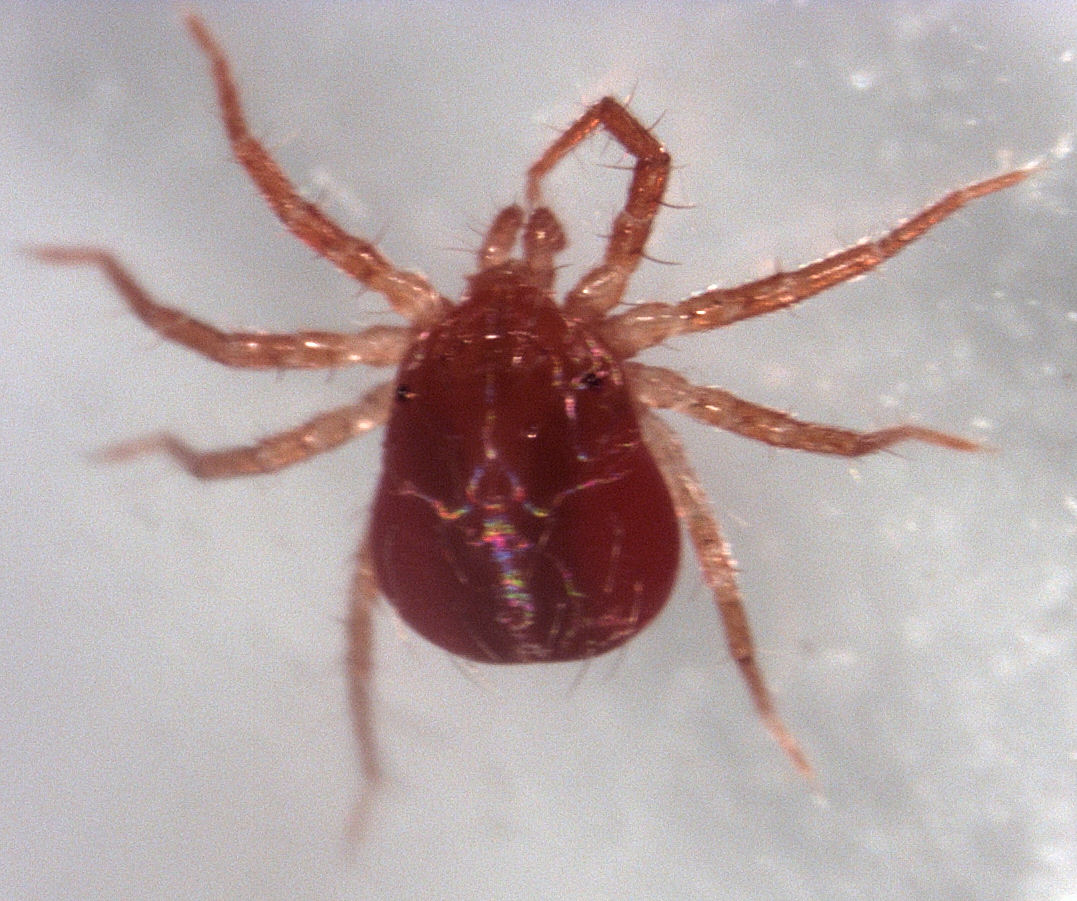

Scientific classification
- Kingdom: Animalia
- Phylum: Arthropoda
- Subphylum: Chelicerata
- Class: Arachnida
- Order: Trombidiformes
- Suborder: Prostigmata
- Infraorder: Anystina
- Superfamily: Anystoidea
- Family: Anystidae; Oudemans, 1936

= Anystidae =

Anystidae Temporal range: Cretaceous–present

Family of mites

Anystidae is a family of mites, based on the genus Anystis. The family has a cosmopolitan distribution, and contains "generalist predators found on a variety of habitats".
