= Pseudocheylidae =

Scientific classification
- Kingdom: Animalia
- Phylum: Arthropoda
- Subphylum: Chelicerata
- Class: Arachnida
- Order: Trombidiformes
- Suborder: Prostigmata
- Infraorder: Anystina
- Superfamily: Anystoidea
- Family: Pseudocheylidae

Family of mites

Pseudocheylidae is a family of mites in the order Trombidiformes. There are at least two genera in Pseudocheylidae.

== Genera ==
These two genera belong to the family Pseudocheylidae:

- Anoplocheylus Berlese, 1910
- Pseudocheylus Berlese, 1888
