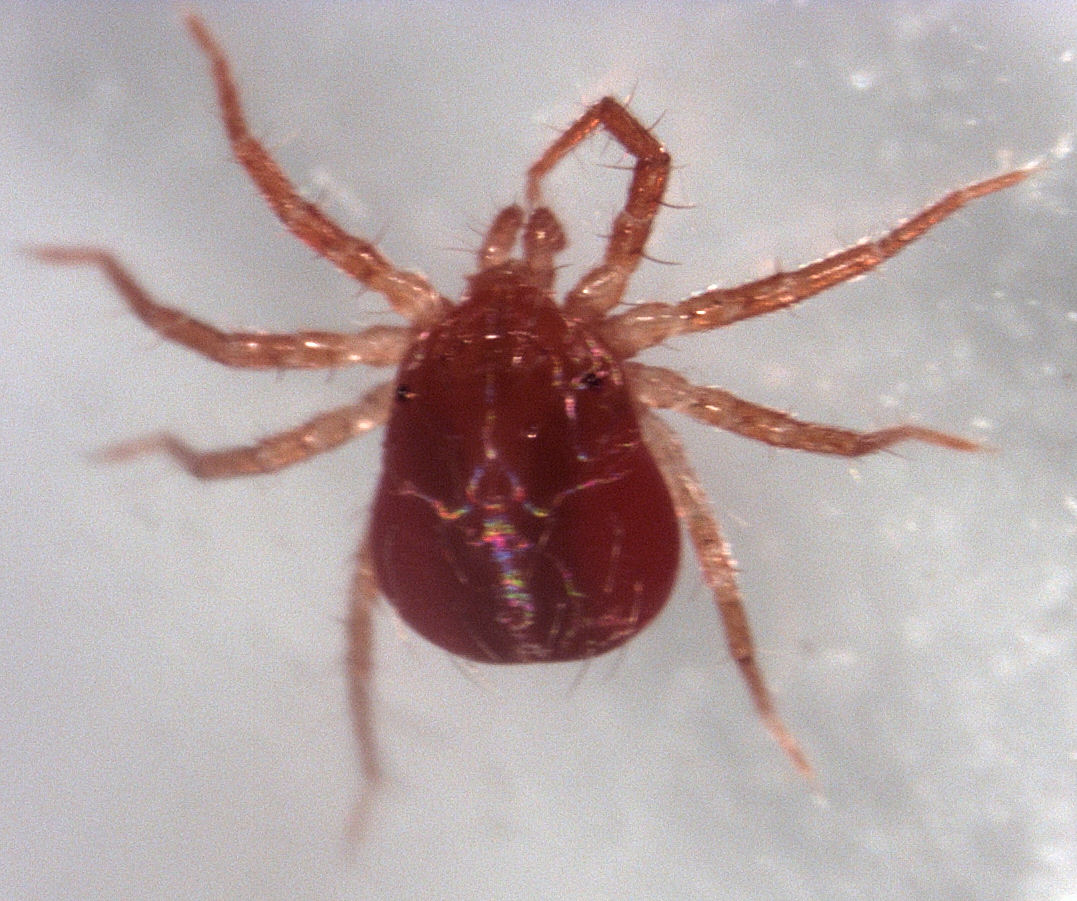
- Anystis

Scientific classification
- Kingdom: Animalia
- Phylum: Arthropoda
- Subphylum: Chelicerata
- Class: Arachnida
- Order: Trombidiformes
- Suborder: Prostigmata
- Infraorder: Anystina
- Superfamily: Anystoidea

Families
- Anystidae; Chulacaridae; Erythracaridae; Pseudocheylidae; Teneriffiidae

= Anystoidea =

Superfamily of mites

Anystoidea is a superfamily of mites in the order Trombidiformes.
