= Erythracaridae =

Scientific classification
- Kingdom: Animalia
- Phylum: Arthropoda
- Subphylum: Chelicerata
- Class: Arachnida
- Order: Trombidiformes
- Suborder: Prostigmata
- Infraorder: Anystina
- Superfamily: Anystoidea
- Family: Erythracaridae

Family of mites

Erythracaridae is a family of mites in the order Trombidiformes. There are seven genera accepted within Erythracaridae.

== Genera ==
These seven genera belong to the family Erythracaridae:

- Chaussieria Oudemans, 1937
- Erythracarus Berlese, 1903
- Lacteoscythis Pogrebnyak, 1995
- Namadia Smith Meyer & Ueckermann, 1987
- Paratarsotomus Kuznetsov, 1983
- Pedidromus Otto, 2000
- Syblia Oudemans, 1936
- Tarsolarkus Thor, 1912
- Tarsotomus Berlese, 1882
