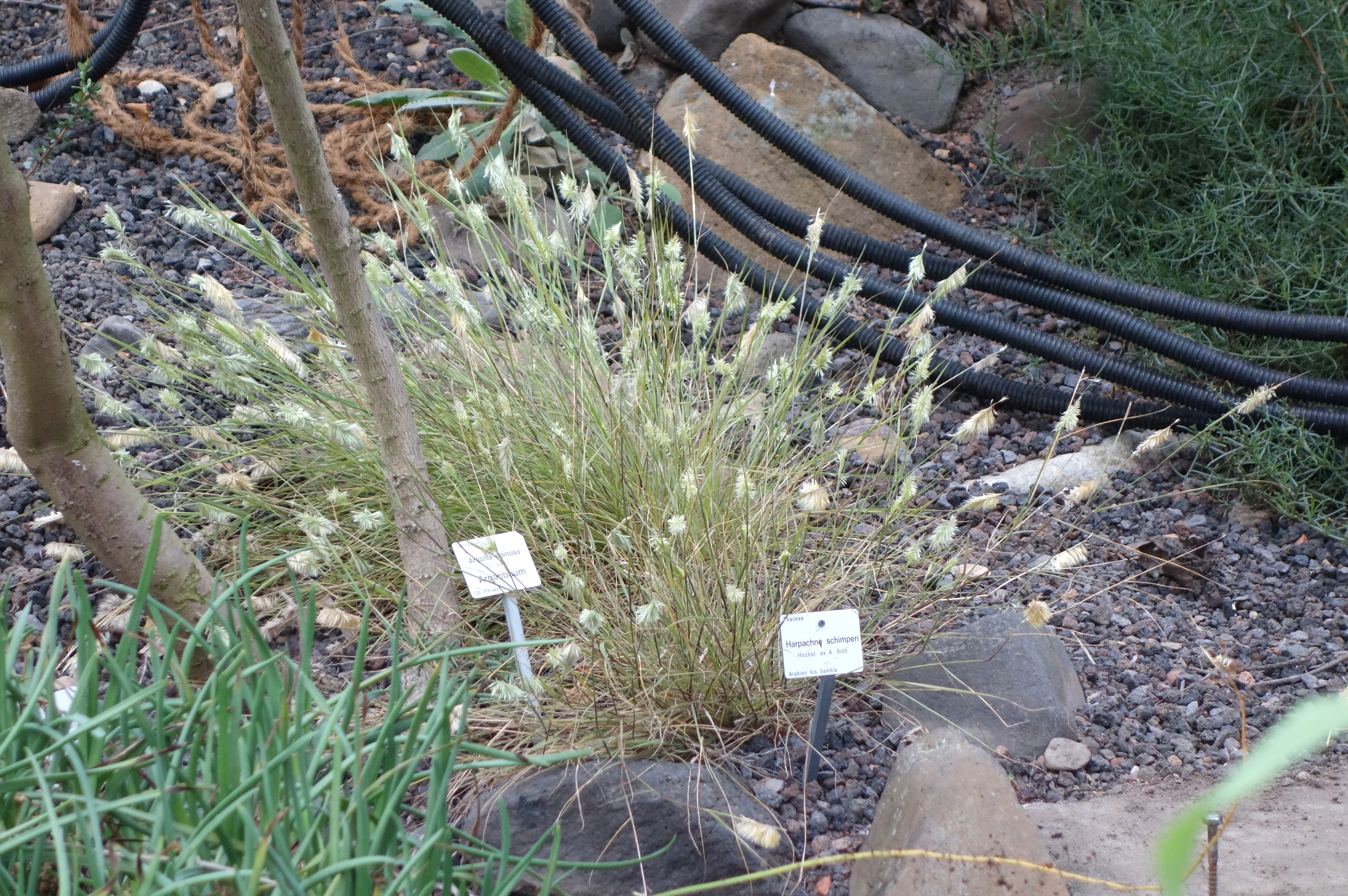
- Harpachne schimperi

Scientific classification
- Kingdom: Plantae
- Clade: Tracheophytes
- Clade: Angiosperms
- Clade: Monocots
- Clade: Commelinids
- Order: Poales
- Family: Poaceae
- Subfamily: Chloridoideae
- Tribe: Eragrostideae
- Subtribe: Eragrostidinae
- Genus: Harpachne; Hochst. ex A.Rich.

Type species
- Harpachne schimperi Hochst. ex A.Rich.

= Harpachne =

Genus of grasses

Harpachne is a genus of Asian and African plants in the grass family.

Species

- Harpachne bogdanii Kenn.-O'Byrne – Kenya
- Harpachne harpachnoides (Hack.) B.S.Sun & S.Wang – China (Sichuan, Yunnan)
- Harpachne schimperi A.Rich. – Yemen, Saudi Arabia, Ethiopia, Eritrea, Somalia, Sudan, South Sudan, Kenya, Uganda, Rwanda, Burundi, Tanzania, Republic of the Congo, Zambia, Zimbabwe
