= Sig Thor =

Norwegian school teacher and biologist

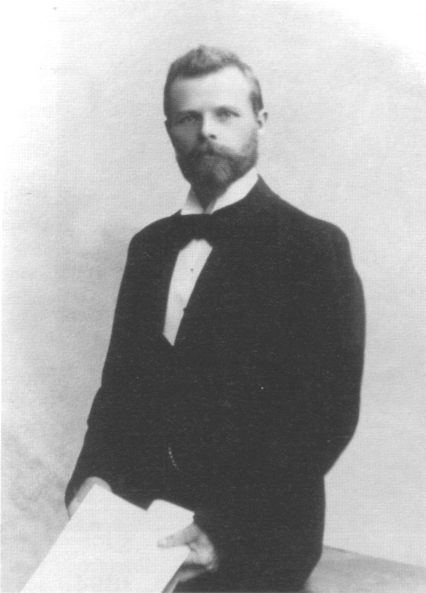

Sig Thor born Sigvart Thorkelsen (15 October 1856 – 18 October 1937) was a Norwegian school teacher, acarologist, arachnologist, and entomologist. He was a founding member of the Norwegian Entomological Society. He was a specialist on the Norwegian water mites (Hydrachnidia) but he also collected other taxa including beetles.

== Life and work ==
Thorkelsen was born in Asker and he later shorted his name to Sig Thor. He studied theology and took his examen artium in 1875. He then studied mathematics and natural science in 1889 and received a doctorate in 1905 with a thesis on the anatomy of the prostigma of acari. He became a teacher and then worked as a headmaster for a girls school in Oslo from 1882 to 1905. He served as a conservator at the Oslo zoological museum (then located on Karl Johans gate) from 1896 to 1905. He became an assistant professor of public schools in Skien and Drammen from 1905 to 1926. He was married to Helene Theodora Mork from 1891. He studied the freshwater mites of Norway and described several species. Along with Wilhelm Maribo Schøyen he was one of the two leading founders of the Norwegian entomological society in 1904. he retired to live in Oslo. He however suffered from depression and in his will he asked for all his specimens (including types) to be destroyed. His widow however saved some of his collections and donated it to the Oslo museum. Another collection of his beetles was discovered in Stabekk Secondary School in Baerum. His obituary by Lundblad described him as a stubborn person with insufficient knowledge of taxonomic practice.
