= Resvoll =

Resvoll is a surname. Notable people with the surname include:

- The Resvoll sisters, Norwegian botanists:

- Hanna Resvoll-Holmsen (1873–1943)
- Thekla Resvoll (1871–1948)
