= Blytt =

Blytt is a Norwegian surname, it may refer to:

- Axel Gudbrand Blytt (1843–1898), Norwegian botanist and geologist (standard botanist abbreviation: A.Blytt) (son of Matthias Numsen Blytt)
- Matthias Numsen Blytt (1789–1862), Norwegian botanist (standard botanist abbreviation: Blytt) (father of Axel Gudbrand Blytt)
