= Finn Wischmann =

Finn Wischmann (28 October 1918 – 8 May 2011) was a Norwegian botanist.

Graduating with a cand.mag. degree, Wischmann spent his entire professional life at the Botanical Museum and the Natural History Museum at the University of Oslo. He edited and translated a Swedish-language Flora entitled Norsk fargeflora, which was published in five editions before Wischmann's death in 2011. He also translated the German language encyclopedia Grosse Bilderlexikon der Pflanzen, which was published under the title Tanums store blomsterbok og botaniske billedleksikon by the publishing house Tanum in 1970.

In 1972, Wischmann wrote the book Verneverdige myrer i Oslo, Asker og Bærum together with Asbjørn Moen, on the conservation of swamps in the Greater Oslo Region. In 1986, he published a book together with Hedvig Wright Østern and Hermod Karlsen. It was titled Ville planter i Norge ("Wild Plants in Norway"), and was reprinted in 1993. Although he preferred copyediting over writing, Wischmann wrote more than 60 articles for botanical journals in Scandinavia. He was also an honorary member of the Norwegian Botanical Society and editorial staff member of its journal Blyttia. Wischmann wrote more than 45,000 herbarium sheets and 21,000 checklists, which record more than half a million plant discoveries.

On 7 November 2003, he was decorated as a Knight, First Class of the Order of St. Olav for his work within Norwegian botanics. He died on 8 May 2011, aged 92. He was buried at Vestre gravlund on 16 May.
