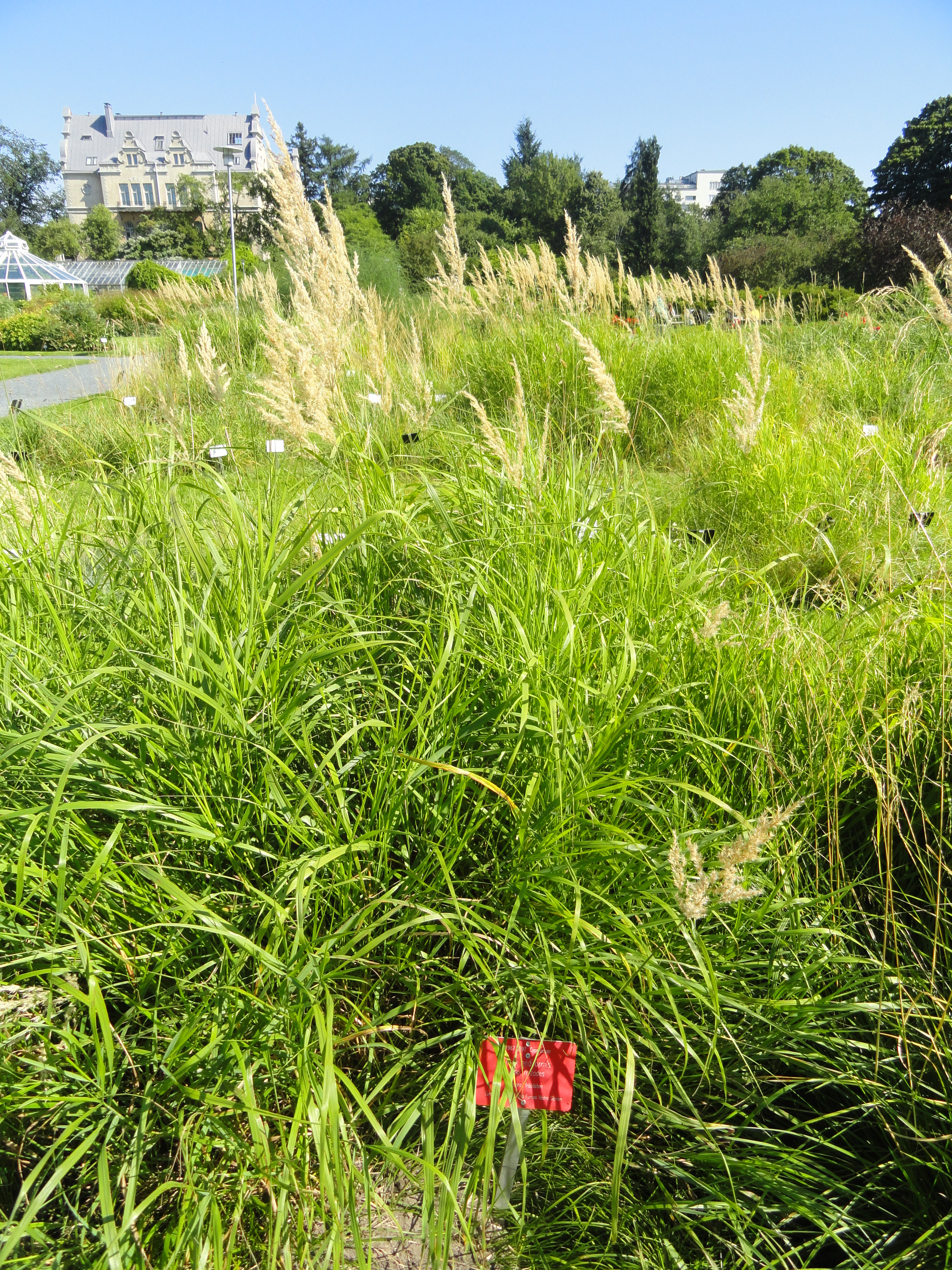

Scientific classification
- Kingdom: Plantae
- Clade: Tracheophytes
- Clade: Angiosperms
- Clade: Monocots
- Clade: Commelinids
- Order: Poales
- Family: Cyperaceae
- Genus: Carex
- Species: C. rhizina

Binomial name
- Carex rhizina Blytt ex Lindblom

= Carex rhizina =

Species of grass-like plant

Carex rhizina is a species of Carex.

It is native to temperate Eurasia.
