= Norwegian Botanical Association =

The Norwegian Botanical Association (Norwegian: Norsk Botanisk Forening) is an association for botany founded in 1935. Its members are qualified botanists, self-taught botanists and other people interested in Norwegian flora. It has approximately 1,500 members in Norway and twelve regional associations which together cover the entire country. It publishes the botanical journal Blyttia four times a year which members can choose to subscribe to. Most of the regional organisations also have their own publications. Most of the association's activities happen locally. It arranges excursions and trips in summer and meetings with slide shows in the winter. Several regional organisations also have their own flora mapping projects. The association also maintains an online plant photo archive.

Together with twelve other associations, the NBA is a member of SABIMA, an umbrella organisation which works to protect biodiversity. It also contributes to various national biodiversity databases.

Previous heads of the association include:

- Olav Gjærevoll (1989–90)
- Leif Ryvarden (1970–71)
- Eilif Dahl (1960–65)
- Ralph Tambs-Lyche (1957–59)
- Trygve Braarud (1947–51)
- Erling Christophersen (1941–45)
- Johannes Lid (1935- )

Honorary members include:

- Knut Fægri
- Ove Arbo Høeg
- Finn Wischmann
- Dagny Tande Lid
