= Johannes Lid =

Norwegian botanist

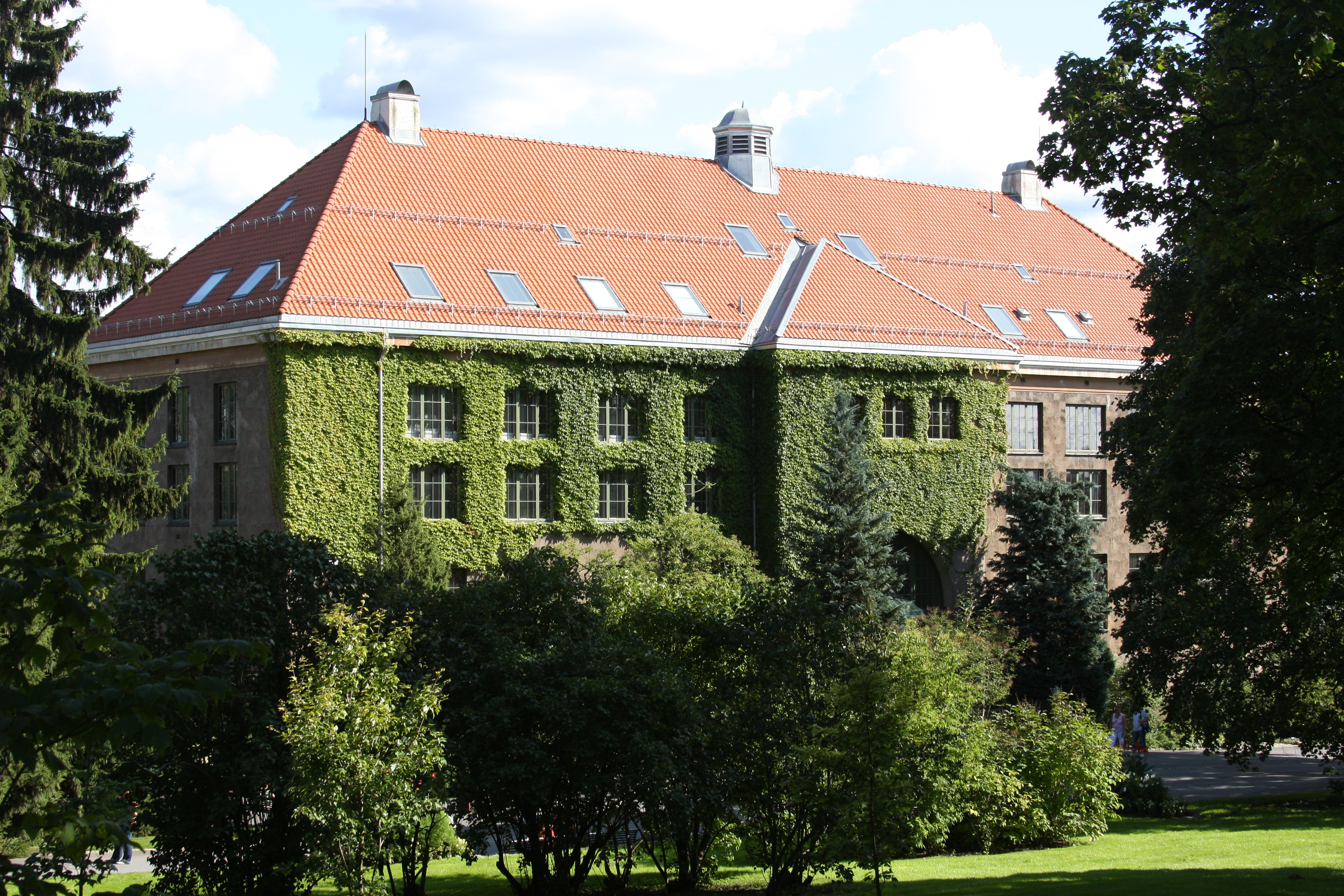
The Lid House (Lids hus) containing the botanical museum and located in the University Botanical Garden at Tøyen, Oslo.

Johannes Lid (11 January 1886 – 29 September 1971) was a Norwegian botanist. He was born in Voss Municipality, and he married the illustrator Dagny Tande Lid in 1936. He is particularly known for his works on Scandinavian flora, and for his widely used handbook to plants Norsk flora, with illustrations by his wife Dagny Tande Lid. He co-founded and chaired the Norwegian Botanical Association from 1935 to 1942. From 1948 onward he served as a curator at the Botanical Museum in Oslo. After his retirement in 1956, he carried out in-depth studies of the flora of the Canary Islands. He became a fellow of the Norwegian Academy of Science and Letters in 1945 and received the King's Medal of Merit in gold in 1956.

== Biography ==
Lid was born in Voss Municipality, Norway on 11 January 1886. In 1936, he married the illustrator Dagny Tande Lid, who would later provide botanical illustrations for many of his publications. He died on 27 September 1971 at the age of 85.

== Career and scientific contributions ==
Johannes Lid conducted botanical field studies ranging from Svalbard in the north to the Canary Islands in the south. His major publication was Norsk Flora ("Norwegian Flora"), first published in 1944 with illustrations by his wife Dagny Tande Lid. This was followed in 1963 by Norsk og svensk flora ("Norwegian and Swedish Flora"), also illustrated by Dagny Tande Lid.

From 1948, Lid served as the First Curator at the botanical museum at the University of Oslo. After his retirement in 1956, he conducted studies of the flora of the Canary Islands.

== Work with the Norwegian Mire Society ==
Lid maintained a professional relationship with Det norske myrselskap (The Norwegian Mire Society), becoming a lifetime member and being elected to its representative council in 1945. His work with the Society lasted approximately 30 years.

His research demonstrated correlations between mire vegetation (using Holmsen's classification of mire types) and chemical analysis results from soil samples. The botanical analyses of plant samples were conducted at the University Botanical Museum in Oslo under Lid's direction.

Following field surveys, Lid co-authored a publication titled Botaniske holdepunkter ved praktisk myrbedømmelse ("Botanical Guidelines for Practical Mire Assessment") in 1943, illustrated by Dagny Tande Lid. It was later republished as Myrtyper og myrplanter ("Mire Types and Mire Plants") in 1950.

Lid also participated in the Mire Society's cultivation experiments with cloudberry (Rubus chamaemorus), published in 1961. These studies documented hermaphroditic flowers in cloudberry plants, which in some cases produced fruit.

== Professional affiliations and recognition ==
Lid co-founded and chaired the Norwegian Botanical Association from 1935 to 1942. He became a fellow of the Norwegian Academy of Science and Letters in 1945. In 1955, Lid was awarded the King's Medal of Merit in gold for his scientific contributions. In 1964, he edited the exsiccata Flora exsiccata insulae Jan Mayen e Museo botanico Universitatis Osloensis distributa ("Dried flora of Jan Mayen Island distributed by the Botanical Museum of the University of Oslo").
