= Thekla Resvoll =

Norwegian botanist (1871–1948)

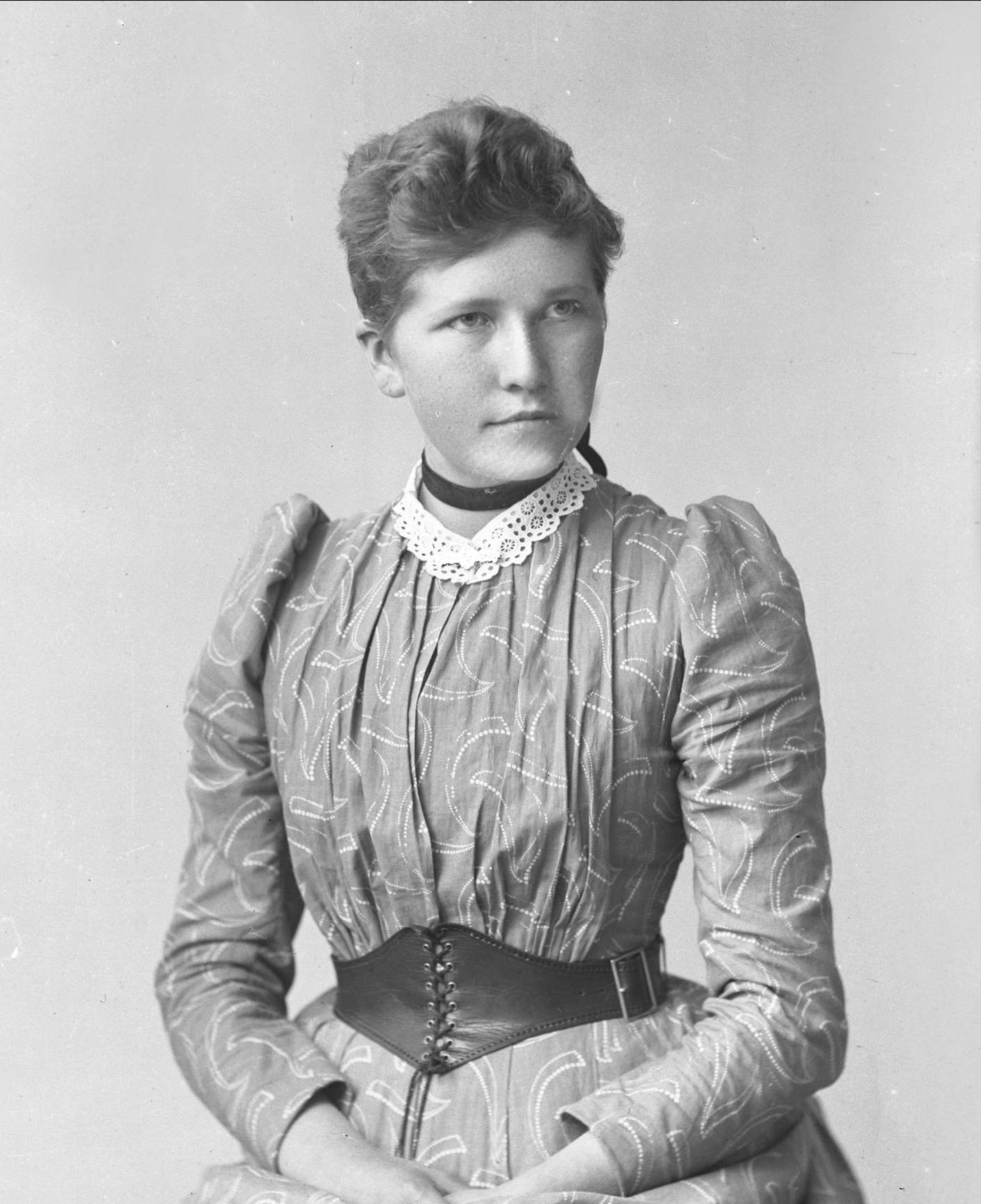
- Thekla Resvoll, photographed in 1891 by Gustav Borgen
- Born: 22 May 1871; Vaage, Norway
- Died: 14 June 1948 (aged 77); Oslo, Norway
- Education: University of Oslo
- Occupations: Botanist, Educator
- Spouse: Andreas Holmsen

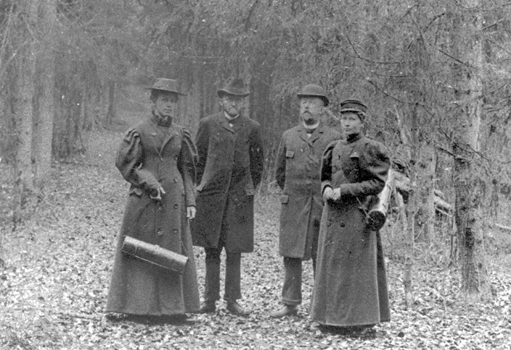
Thekla Resvoll (far right) during an excursion with Asta Lundell, Ove Dahl and Axel Blytt

Thekla Susanne Ragnhild Resvoll (22 May 1871 – 14 June 1948) was a Norwegian botanist and educator. She was a pioneer in Norwegian natural history education and nature conservation together with her sister, Hanna Resvoll-Holmsen.

== Biography ==
Resvoll was born at Vaage Municipality (now spelled Vågå) in Oppland, Norway. She was the daughter of Hans Resvoll (1823–1908) and Julie Martine Deichman (1831–1902). She worked as a nurse in an upper-class home in Stockholm before commencing studies of natural history at the Royal Frederick University (now University of Oslo) in Kristiania 1894. She became an adept of the professor of botany, Axel Blytt. After her graduation in 1899, she went to Copenhagen where she worked at the University of Copenhagen's botanical laboratory under Professor Eugen Warming. In 1900, she returned to the University of Oslo. She was made an associate professor at the University Botanical Garden in 1902.

She obtained her doctorate in 1918 on the basis of a thesis entitled On Plants Suited to a Cold and Short Summer, in which she presented studies on adaptations of alpine plants to the harsh environment. These studies were Warmingian of nature, that is they were based on meticulous observations of plant individuals—their clonal and sexual propagation, perennation etc. Thus, it was plant population ecology before that discipline was first conceived.

Thekla Resvoll made a visit to Java and the botanic garden in Buitenzorg in 1923-24. She studied Fagaceous trees in the Javan flora. She found that they had hibernation buds and interpreted it as an unnecessary trait – a rudiment from their temperate origin. She remained at the Botanical Laboratory until her retirement in 1936. Her botany classes made a lasting impact on generations of Norwegian students. She also wrote a textbook on botany for secondary school students.

== Women's rights ==
Alongside her academic career, Thekla Resvoll took part in the women's equality movement in Norway. She was a board member of the Norwegian Association for Women's Rights from 1901, was a head of the Norwegian Female Student’s Club and served on the board of the women's suffrage movement (Kvinnestemmeretsforeningen).

== Personal life ==
She was married to mining engineer Andreas Holmsen (1869-1955) whose brother Gunnar Holmsen (1880–1976) was married to her sister Hanna. She was the third woman to become a member of the Norwegian Academy of Science and Letters. She died in 1948 in Oslo.

== Selected scientific works ==
- Resvoll, T. R. (1900). "Nogle arktiske ranunklers morfologi og anatomi". Nyt Magazin for Naturvidenskaberne (in Norwegian). No. 38. pp. 343–367. "Proof of energy storage in the rhizome of Ranunculus glacialis"
- Resvoll, T. R. (1903). "Den nye Vegetation paa Lerfaldet i Værdalen". Nyt Magazin for Naturvidenskaberne (in Norwegian). No. 41. "Describes primary succession"
- Resvoll, T. R. (1906). "Pflanzenbiologische Beobachtungen aus dem Flugsandgebiet bei Röros im inneren Norwegen". Nyt Magazin for Naturvidenskaberne (in German). No. 44.
- Resvoll, T. R. (1917). Om planter som passer til kort og kold sommer (Doctoral thesis thesis) (in Norwegian). Oslo.
- Resvoll, T. R. (1925). "Rubus chamaemorus L. A morphological - biological study". Nytt Magasin for Naturvidenskapene. No. 67. pp. 55–129.
- Resvoll, T. R. (1925). "Rubus chamaemorus L. Die geographische Verbreitung der Pflanze und ihre Verbreitungsmittel". Veröffentlichungen des Geobotanischen Institutes Rübel in Zürich (in German). 3 (3). Zürich: Geobotanisches Institut Rübel: 224–241. doi:10.5169/seals-306772.
- Resvoll, T. R. (1925). "Beschuppte Laubknospen in den immerfeuchten Tropenwäldern Javas". Flora oder Allgemeine Botanische Zeitung. 118–119. Jena: 409–420. doi:10.1016/S0367-1615(17)32903-8. ISSN 0367-1615. "Hibernation buds in Tropical trees"

== Other sources ==
- Obituary by Høeg, O.A. in Blyttia 6: 57-61 (1948).
- Eckblad, F.-E. (1991) Thekla Resvoll og Hanna Resvoll-Holmsen, to glemte? Pionerer i norsk botanikk. Blyttia 49: 3-10.
- Biography by Inger Nordal & Bredo Berntsen in Norsk biografisk leksikon, Oslo: Kunnskapsforlaget (1999-2005)
- Norwegian biography with pictures

== Related reading ==
- Lønnå, Elisabeth (1996). Stolthet og kvinnekamp : Norsk kvinnesaksforenings historie fra 1913 (in Norwegian). Oslo: Gyldendal. ISBN 8205244952.
