= Ove Dahl =

Norwegian botanist

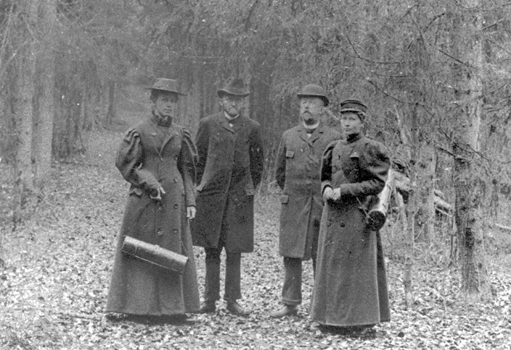
- From an excursion with Asta Lundell, Ove Dahl, Axel Blytt and Thekla Resvoll.
- Born: 29 January 1862; Orkdal Municipality, Norway
- Died: 17 September 1940 (aged 78)
- Occupation: Botanist

Ove Christian Dahl (29 January 1862 – 17 September 1940) was a Norwegian botanist. He was born in Orkdal Municipality. He graduated in philology from the University of Kristiania in 1886, and then worked as a teacher. His interests eventually turned towards botany, and he was appointed at the Botanical Museum in Kristiania from 1893 to 1922, the first years as assistant to professor Axel Blytt. He is particularly known for his plant geographical works, and also for completing Blytt's Norwegian flora in 1906. This flora was the only such work in Norway until the 1940s. His later years were tragic, and he spent his last eighteen years at a psychiatric institution.
