= Blyttia (journal) =

Scientific journal of botany

Blyttia (ISSN 0006-5269) is a quarterly peer-reviewed scientific journal of botany published by the Norwegian Botanical Association since 1943. It was the successor of the Norsk Botanisk Forenings Meddelelser. The editor-in-chief is Jan Wesenberg. The journal is named after the Norwegian botanists Matthias Numsen Blytt (1789–1862) and his son Axel Gudbrand Blytt (1843–1898).
