= Dagny Tande Lid =

Norwegian artist and poet (1903–1998)

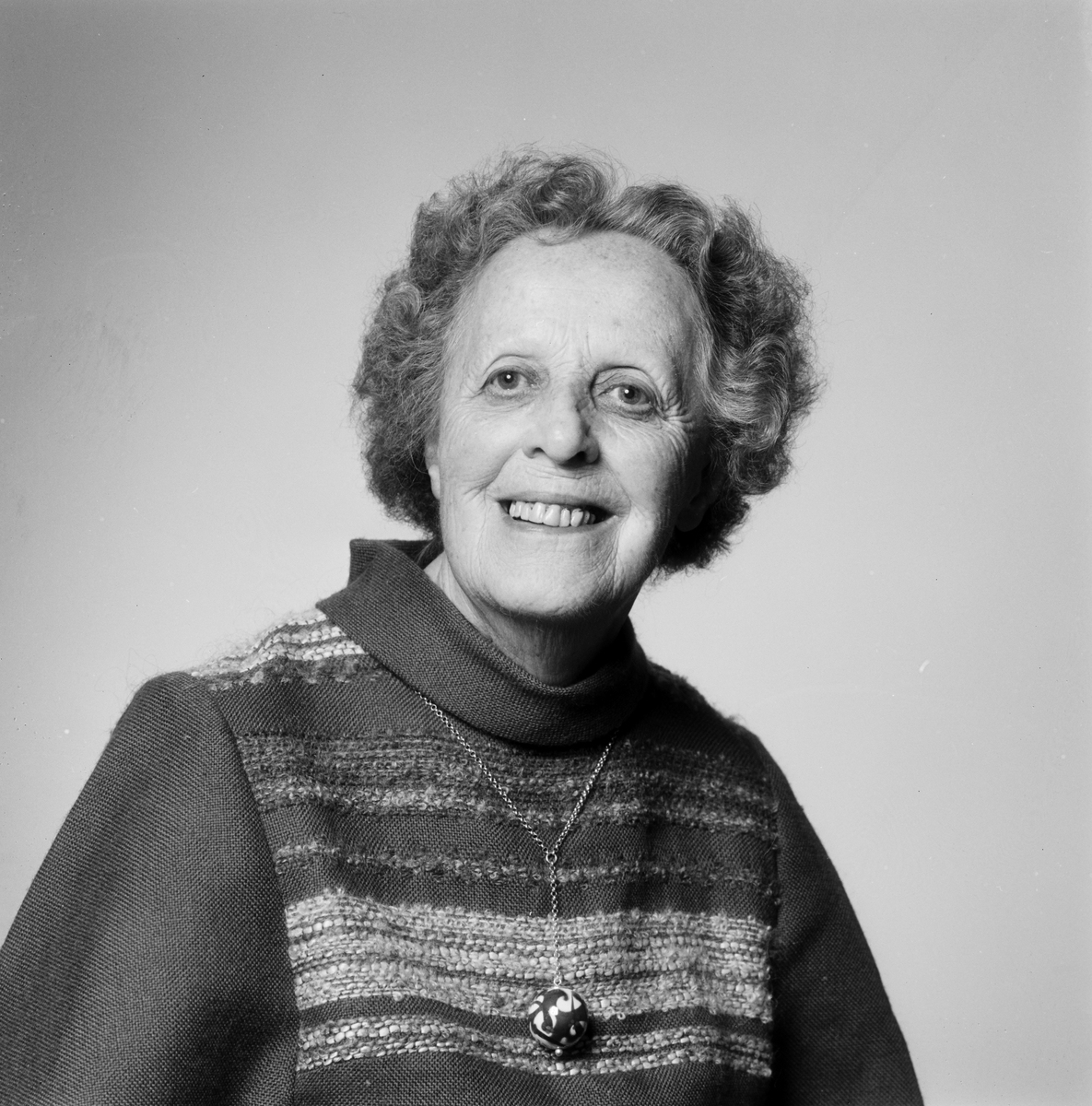
- Born: May 25, 1903; Nissedal, Telemark, Norway
- Died: January 28, 1998 (aged 94); Oslo, Norway
- Education: Norwegian National Academy of Craft and Art Industry
- Known for: Artist
- Spouse: Johannes Lid (1886–1971)
- Awards: Schönste Bücher aus aller Welt, Leipzig

Dagny Tande Lid (25 May 1903 – 28 January 1998) was a Norwegian painter, illustrator and poet. She is most noted for her drawings of plants and is known for her own illustrated poetry collections and for her botanical illustrations of Norwegian postage stamps.

== Background ==
Dagny Tande was born May 25, 1903, in Nissedal Municipality in Telemark county, Norway. Her parents were Johan Didrik Tande (1869–1938) and Thea Gertine Mortensen (1863–1951). She attended the Norwegian National Academy of Craft and Art Industry under Eivind Nielsen (1928–29), and evening school with Olaf Willums (1929–33), and at the Art Academy under Halfdan Strøm and Axel Revold (1929–30). From 1931-1933, she also took up the study of tapestry at the National Women's Industrial School (Statens kvinnelige industriskole i Oslo).

== Career ==
Her work as an illustrator of scientific and popular works of botany has won great acclaim. Lid is best known for her illustrations for the Norwegian Mountain Flora (Fjellflora), which has been issued in 325 000 copies since the first printing in 1952. The text was written by Norwegian botanist and politician, Olav Gjærevoll. The book has been translated into several languages, including English, German, Swedish and Finnish.

She is also represented in several of the popular papers and books by Danish-Canadian botanist Erling Porsild, including Edible plants of the Arctic (1953), Illustrated Flora of the Canadian Arctic Archipelago (1957), and Rocky Mountain wild flowers (1974). She also illustrated Føroya Flora (1936) by Rasmus Rasmussen, Svalbards flora (1979) by Olaf I. Rønning, Flora of Alaska and Neighboring Territories (1968) by Eric Hultén and some Icelandic floras by Áskell Löve.

In 1936, she married Norwegian conservationist, botanist, ethnologist and author Johannes Lid (1886–1971). She worked for many years as illustrator for her husband, who for many years wrote floras for Norway, Sweden and Finland.

From 1959 until the early 1980s she made the illustrations for ten Norwegian stamps with flowers. They rank among Norway's most popular stamps issued. Her Mountain Flora illustrations were also printed on china cups and plates.

Her style is marked by a great sense of detail, combined with clarity which some critics claim has made her illustrations like comic book illustrations. Some will see similarities between her work with flowers and the Belgian artist, Hergé, in the ligne claire style and the interest in accuracy and detail. However, her personal style has been a source of inspiration for many amateur botanists, and her work has contributed to the growth in interest in botany, particularly in Norway's mountain regions.

== Written works ==
As an author of poems and prose pieces, Dagny Tande Lid told of her childhood in an itinerant minister's family, about people and events that have meant a lot to her, and about joy and happiness in work and marriage. She wrote several collections of poems, illustrated by herself, in her later years. In 1987 her autobiography, Mitt liv was issued and in 1974 Lykken mellom to mennesker, a biographical tribute to her marriage to Johannes Lid.

- Syng blomstring: Tegninger og dikt (1975)
- Vindens lek (1977)
- Høstens blader: Tegninger og dikt (1978)
- Vart underlige liv: Illustrert med noen av jordens sjeldneste vekster (1979)
- Brikker i et spill (1981)
- Guds fotspor (1982)
- Langs stien (1983)
- Dagboksblader: Fra et pensjonisthjem (1984)
- Forventning: Nye dagboksblader (1985)

== Related reading ==
- Hulten, Eric (1968) Flora of Alaska and Neighboring Territories: A Manual of the Vascular Plants (Stanford University Press)
- Porsild, Erling (1964) Illustrated Flora of the Canadian Arctic Archipelago (National Museum of Canada)
- Rønning, Olaf (1996) The Flora of Svalbard (Norsk polarinstitutt) ISBN 978-8276661002
