= Axel Gudbrand Blytt =

Norwegian botanist and geologist (1843–1898)

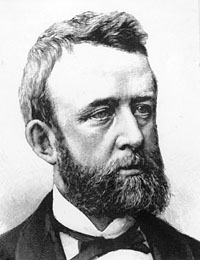
- Born: May 19, 1843; Christiania (now Oslo), Norway
- Died: July 18, 1898 (aged 55); Oslo, Norway
- Education: The Royal Frederick University
- Known for: Blytt-Sernander theory
- Awards: Crown Prince's Gold Medal (1869)
- Scientific career
- Fields: Botany, Geology
- Workplaces: The Royal Frederick University

Axel Gudbrand Blytt (19 May 1843 – 18 July 1898) was a Norwegian professor, botanist and geologist. He was the author of a number of books regarding the flora of Norway. Today he is most associated with his role in developing the Blytt-Sernander theory of climatic change.

== Biography ==
Blytt was born in Kristiania (now Oslo), Norway. He was the son of Matthias Numsen Blytt (1789–1862) and Ambrosia Henriksen (1822–1900). His father was a noted professor of botany at The Royal Frederick University (now University of Oslo). He graduated Examen artium from Royal Frederick University in 1860. After the death of his father in 1862, he continued his father's work with Norwegian flora. Axel Blytt served with the Christiania Herbarium at the University of Oslo from 1865, first as a conservator, then from 1880 as a professor. In 1869, he was awarded the Crown Prince's gold medal (Kronprinsens gullmedalje).

Based partly on his father's work, he published Norges Flora in two volumes during 1874 and 1876. His work, Essay on the Immigration of Norwegian Flora (1876) was read by and influenced Charles Darwin.

He died in Oslo during 1898. His work Haandbog i Norges flora was completed and published posthumously by botanist Ove Dahl during 1906.

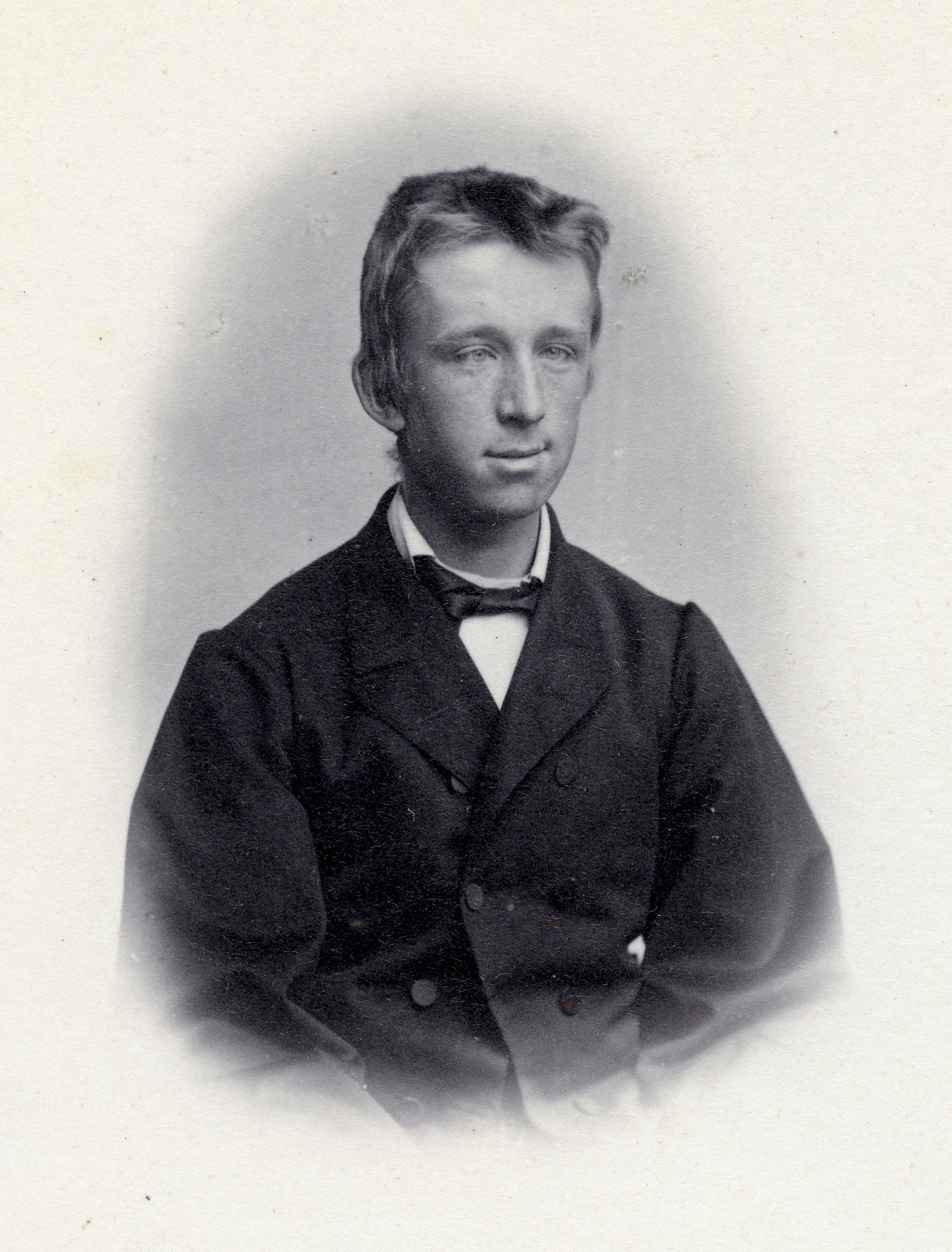
In 1865

== Legacy ==
Blyttberget, a high crag southeast of Nordlaguna on the Norwegian island of Jan Mayen, is named for him. The German botanist Wilhelm Schimper named several mosses after him as well.

The remaining existent specimens Blytt collected on his studies are held at the Botanical Museum of the University of Oslo. The Buffalo Museum of Science in Buffalo, New York also holds a collection of specimens attributed to a collector identified as "Blytt", who is likely Axel Blytt. This is evidenced by Charles Peck, the New York State Botanist from 1883 to 1913, in his 1872 Report of the Botanist to the New York Senate. Peck wrote that he had received 22 specimens of lichens from the University of Norway, Christiana (Oslo), Norway, for the New York State Cabinet. There is also a mention of Blytt in correspondence between the Swiss botanist Leo Lesquereux and George W. Clinton, then President of the Buffalo Society of Natural Sciences, regarding specimens and a visit to the Buffalo Museum by Lesquereux. Though the existing correspondence only provides Lesquereux's letters, he refers to Blytt as "a good Norwegian Botanist I do not know his address in any other way than as you write it. Christiania Norway."

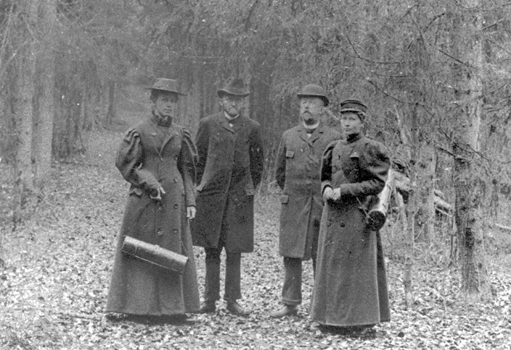
At Sandvika October 24, 1897. From left, Asta Lundell (1875-1915), Ove Dahl (1862-1940), Axel Gudbrand Blytt, Thekla Resvoll (1871-1948)

== Selected works ==
- Botanisk Reise i Valders og de tilgrændsende Egne, 1864
- Om Vegetationsforholdene ved Sognefjorden, 1869
- Vore beste spiselige Soparter, 1869
- Christiania Omegns Phanerogamer og Bregner, 1870
- Spiselige Lavarter, 1870
- Norges Flora. Andel og tredie Del, 2 volumes, 1874–76
- Haandbog i Norges flora (completed and published by Ove Dahl), 1906

== Related reading ==
- The Probable Cause of the Displacement of Beach-lines: An Attempt to Compute Geological Epochs (1889)
