= Hanna Resvoll-Holmsen =

Norwegian biologist

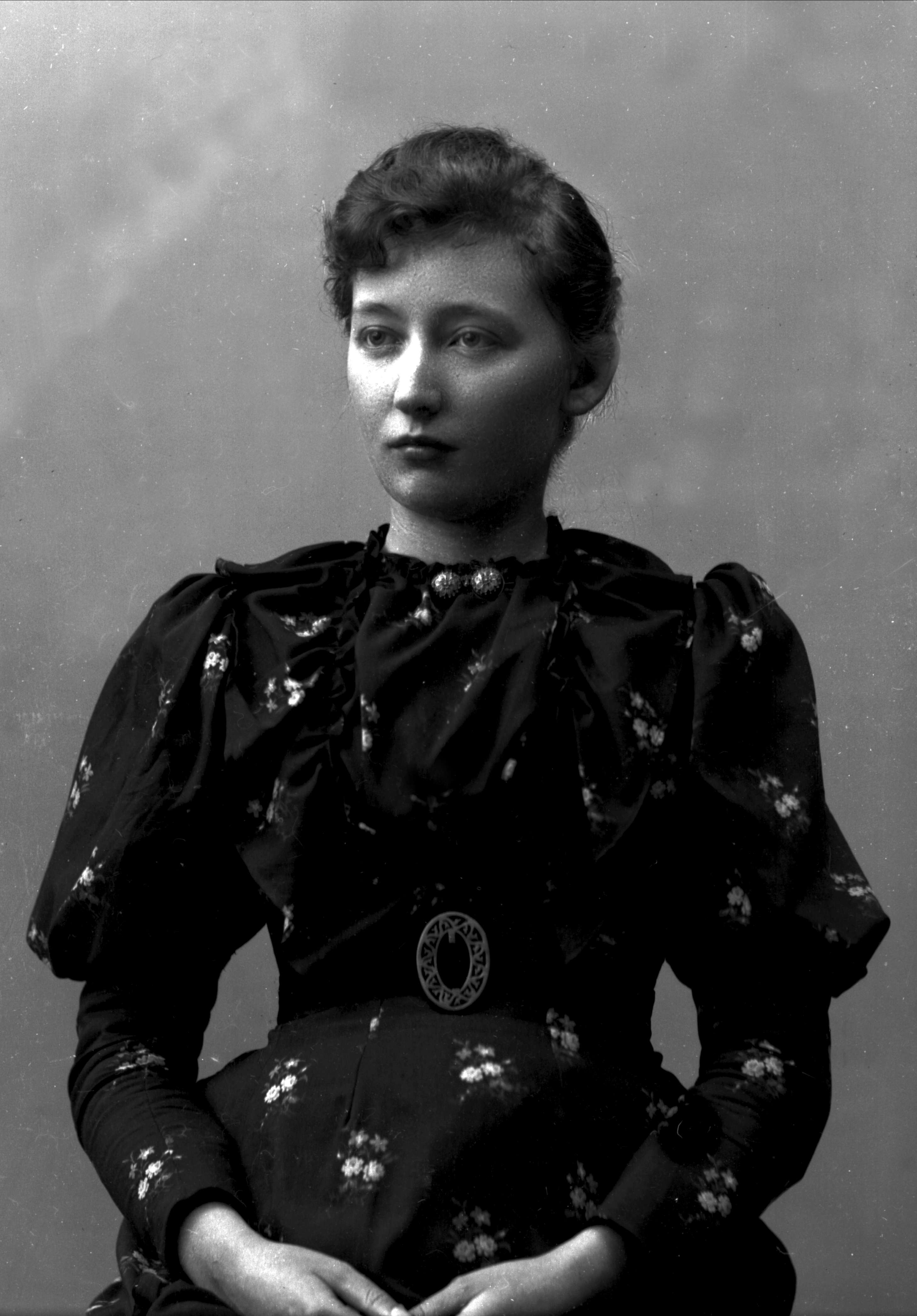
Hanna Resvoll-Holmsen

Hanna Marie Resvoll-Holmsen (née Resvoll) (11 September 1873 in Vaage Municipality, Oppland – 13 March 1943 in Oslo) was a Norwegian botanist – a female pioneer in Norwegian natural history education and nature conservation together with her sister, Thekla Resvoll.

== Life ==
Hanna Resvoll-Holmsen suffered much from illness in her childhood and school attendance after her 12th year was sporadic. She took a high school exam in 1902, at which time she had also an unhappy marriage behind her. She studied natural history at the Royal Frederik's University in Kristiania and graduated in botany in 1910. From 1921, she was docent in plant geography at the same university, a position she held until her retirement in 1938.

Hanna Resvoll-Holmsen participated as a botanist in the Svalbard expedition in 1907 led by the oceanographer Prince Albert. The next year she went to Svalbard alone mainly to take photographs, partly in colour. These photographs constitute a unique early documentation of Svalbard’s nature. Her botanical observations were first published as Observations botaniques in Monaco, later in Norwegian as Svalbards Flora (1927) – the first flora of this archipelago.

Using Christen C. Raunkiær’s quantitative methods, she made a large vegetation survey of Norwegian alpine vegetation, published as Om Fjeldvegetationen i det Østenfjeldske Norge (On the mountain vegetation in Norway east of the Scandes; 1920). She was particularly interested in the subalpine birch forests. She published an essay Om betydningen av det uensartede i våre skoger (On the significance of heterogeneity in forests), which made plead for the conservation of natural mountain forest and criticized its replacement by spruce plantations. This pamphlet caused much animosity against her among foresters.

Together with the geologist Adolf Hoel, she was behind the first designation of a conservation area in Svalbard. She was a strong advocate for nature conservation in the Norwegian mountains. She is known in Norwegian conservation circles as the country's first green stocking.

Resvoll-Holmsen was first married to Hans Dieset (divorced 1901), then from 1909 to state geologist Gunnar Holmsen (1880–1976), brother of her sister's husband.

The buttercup species Ranunculus resvoll-holmseniae (Ranunculaceae) has been named to her honour.

== Photographs ==
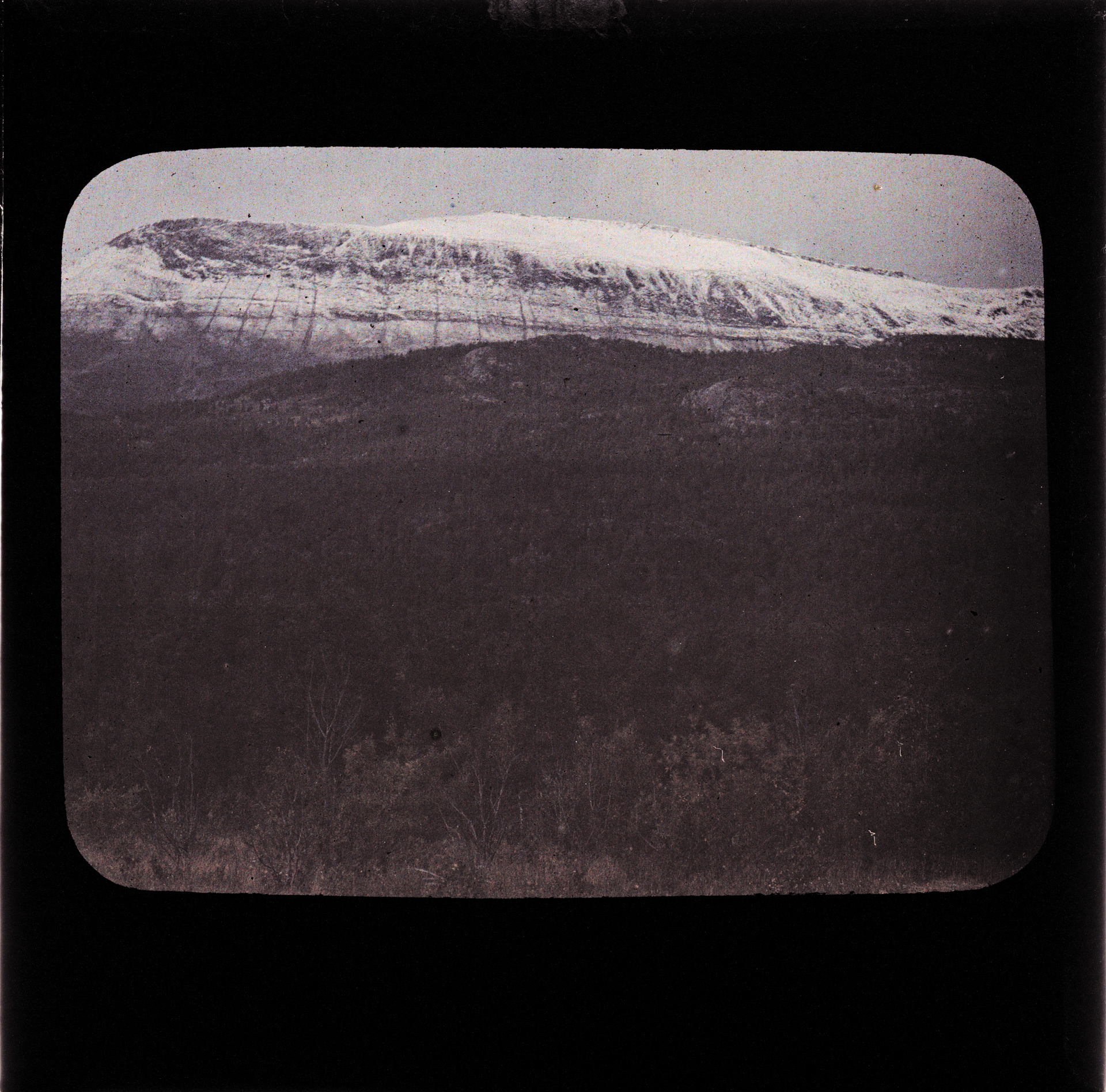
Research trip in Troms 1912

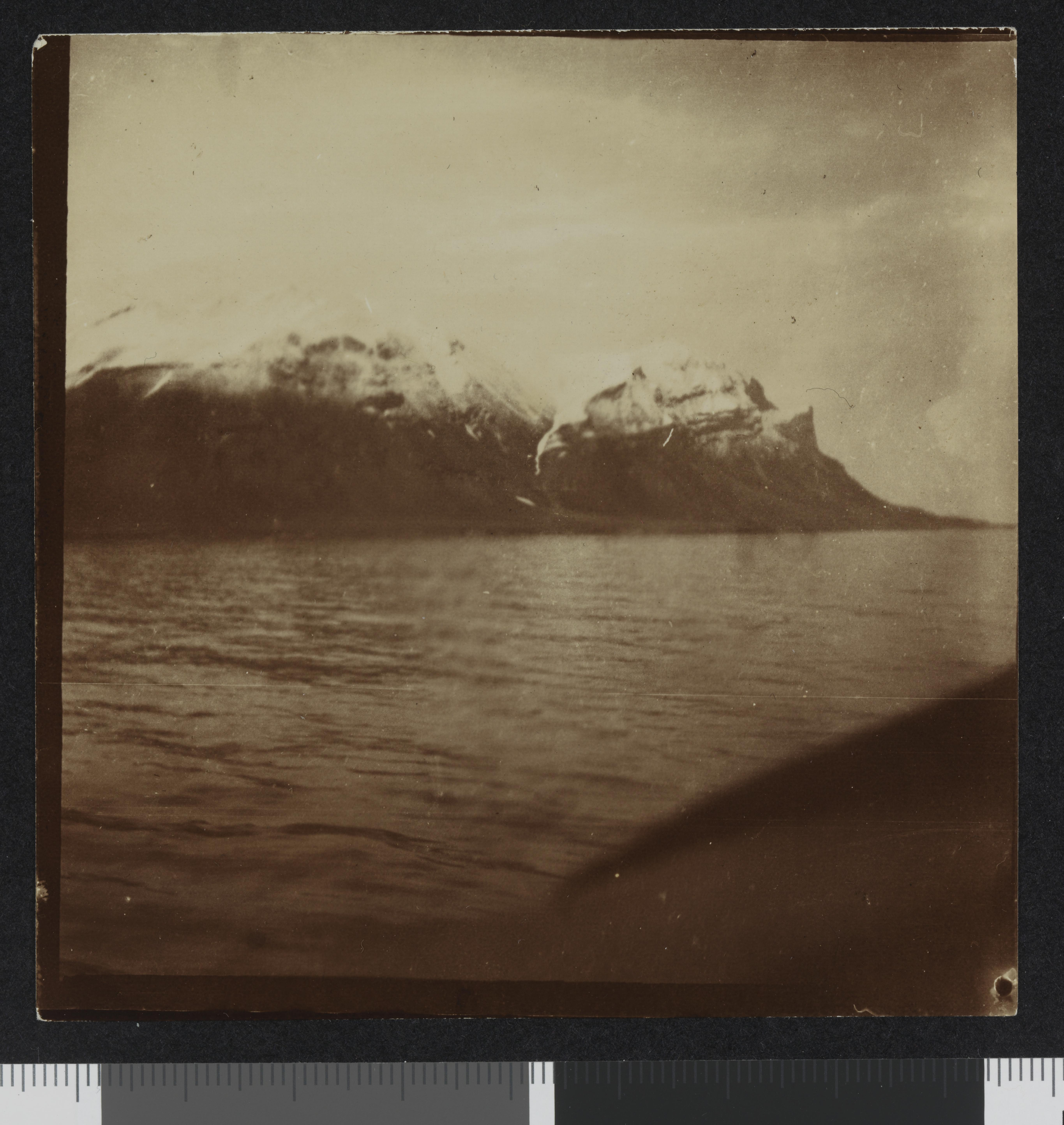
1 January 1907

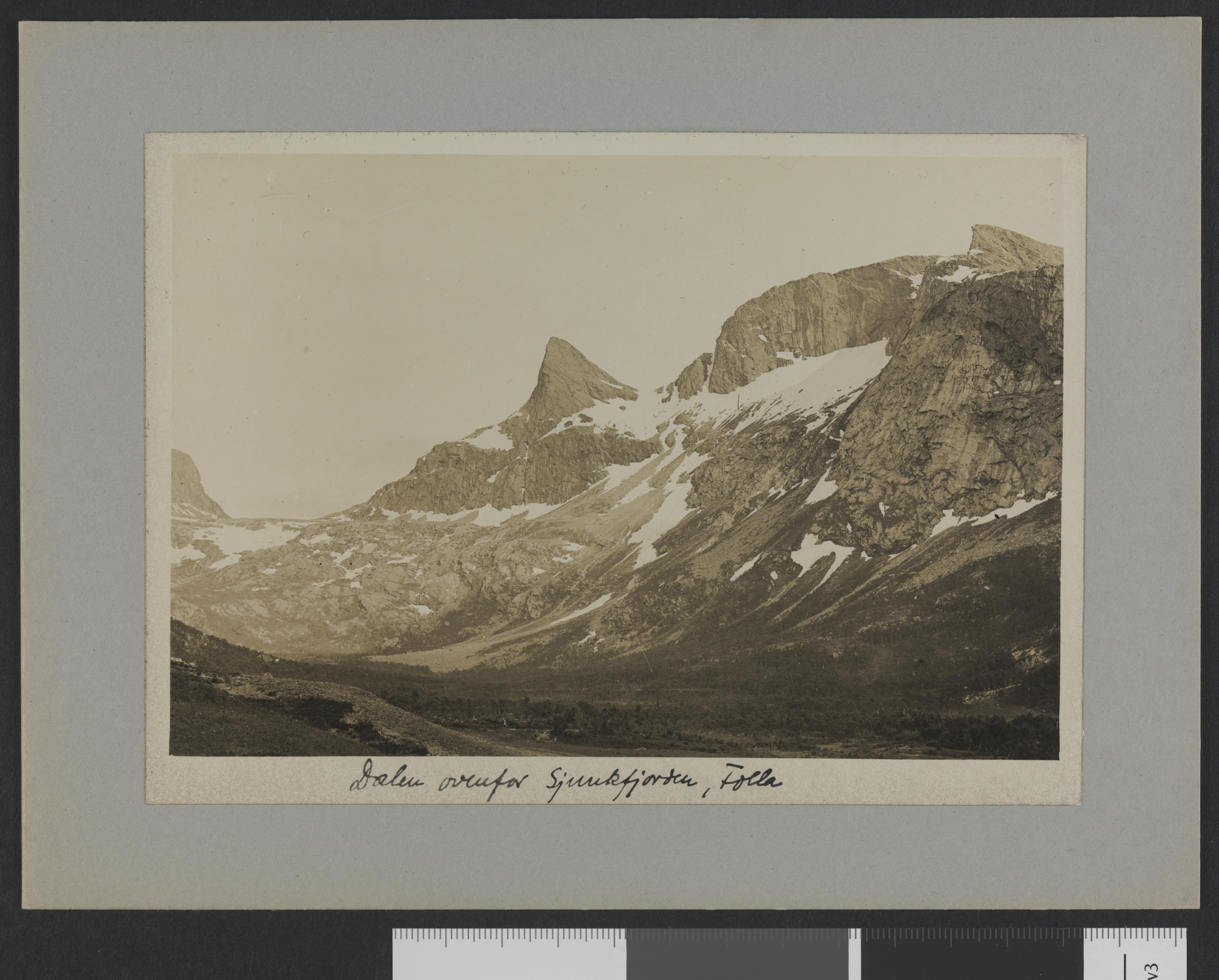
Between 1909 and 1912

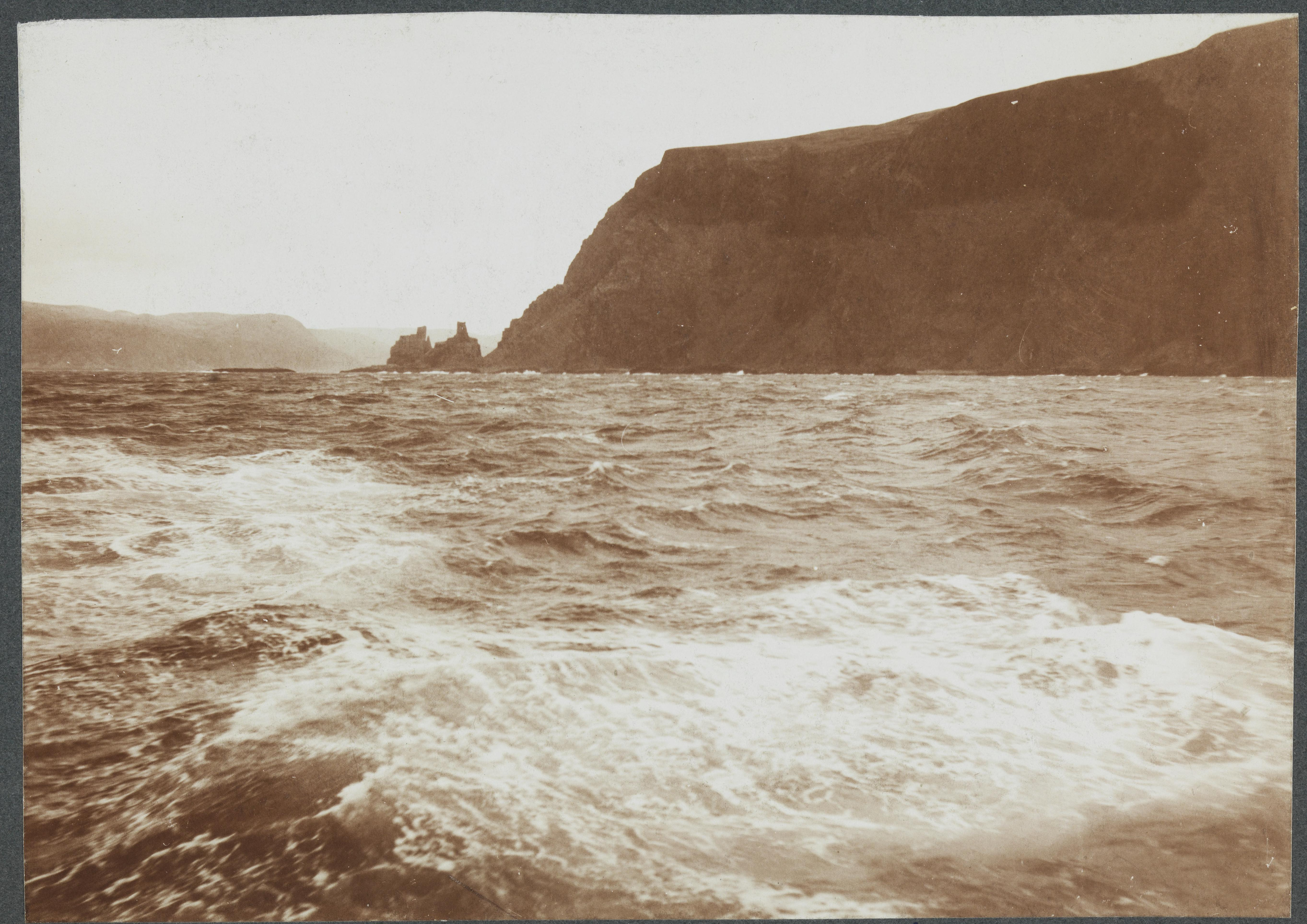
15 September 1909.

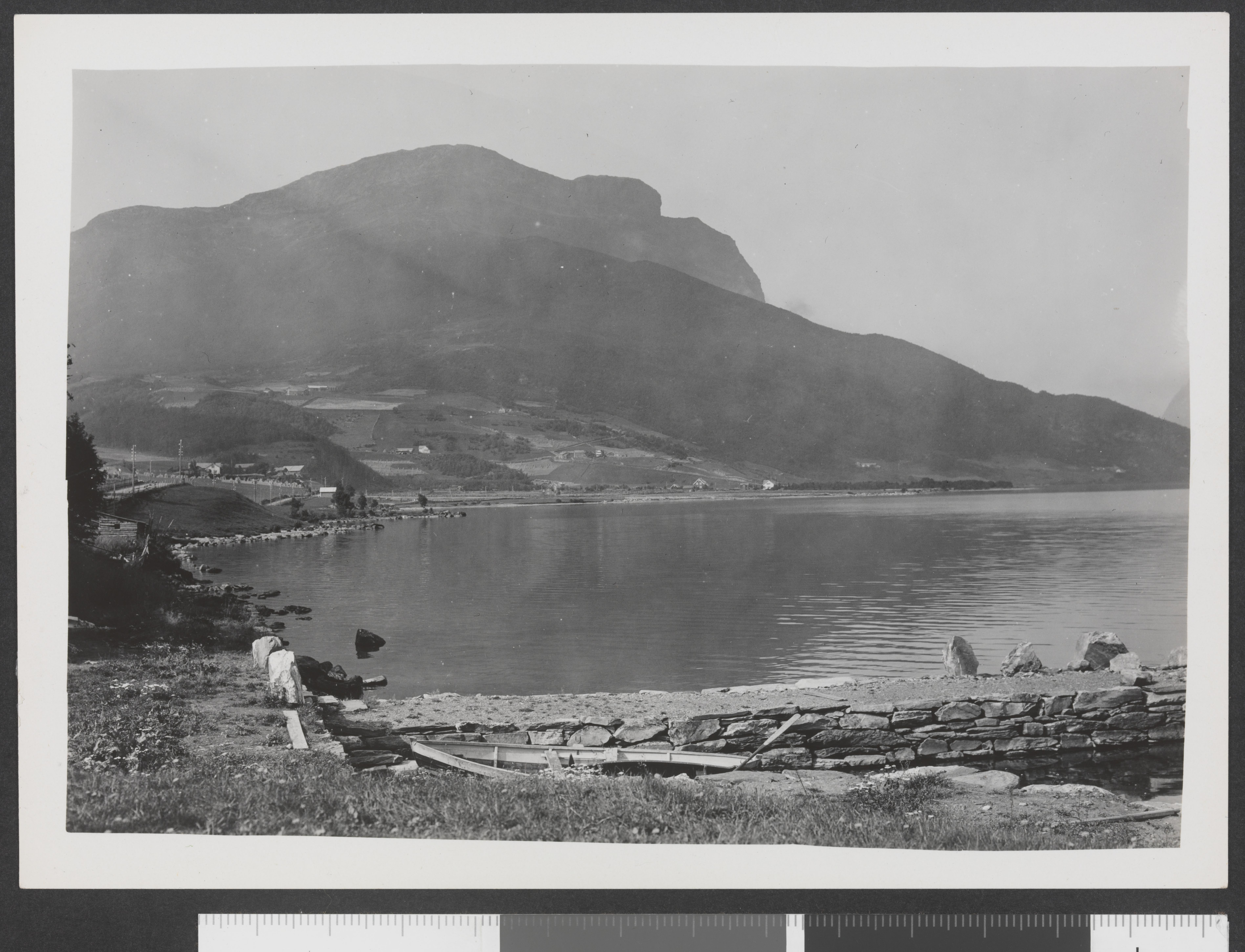
Between 15 June 1930 and 15 August 1930

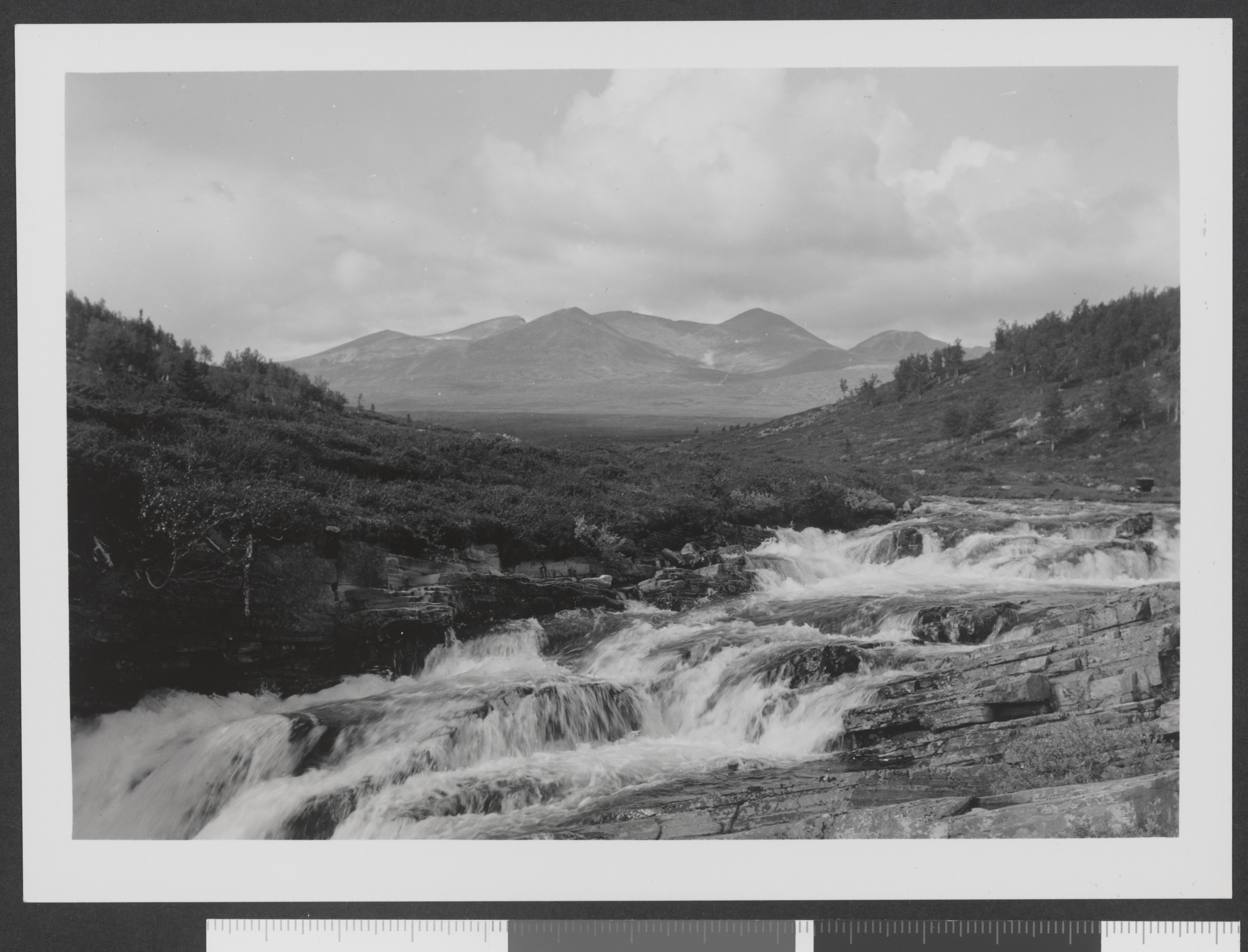
1933 Mysuseter, Sell

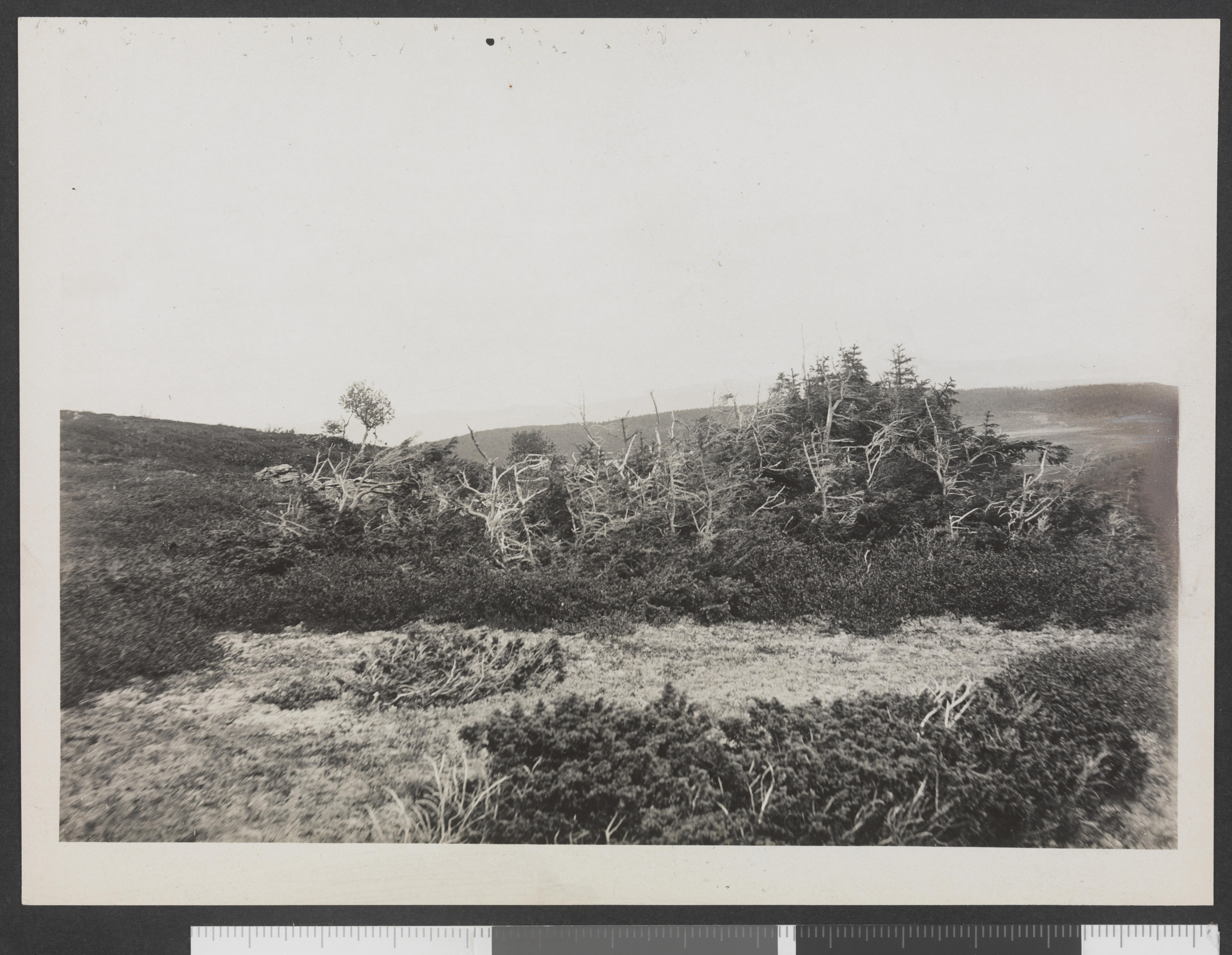
17 July 1916

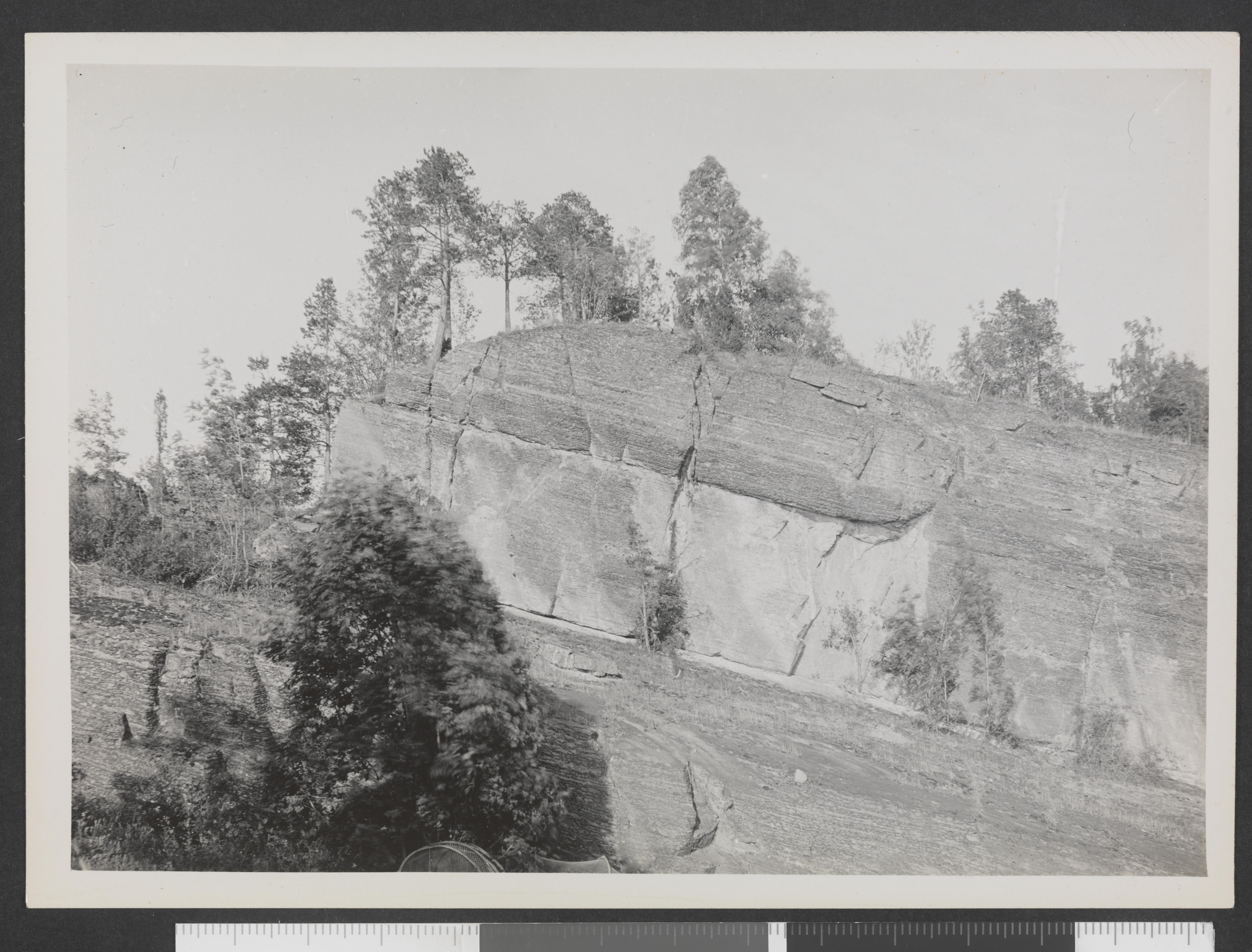
15 June 1923 and 15 August 1923.

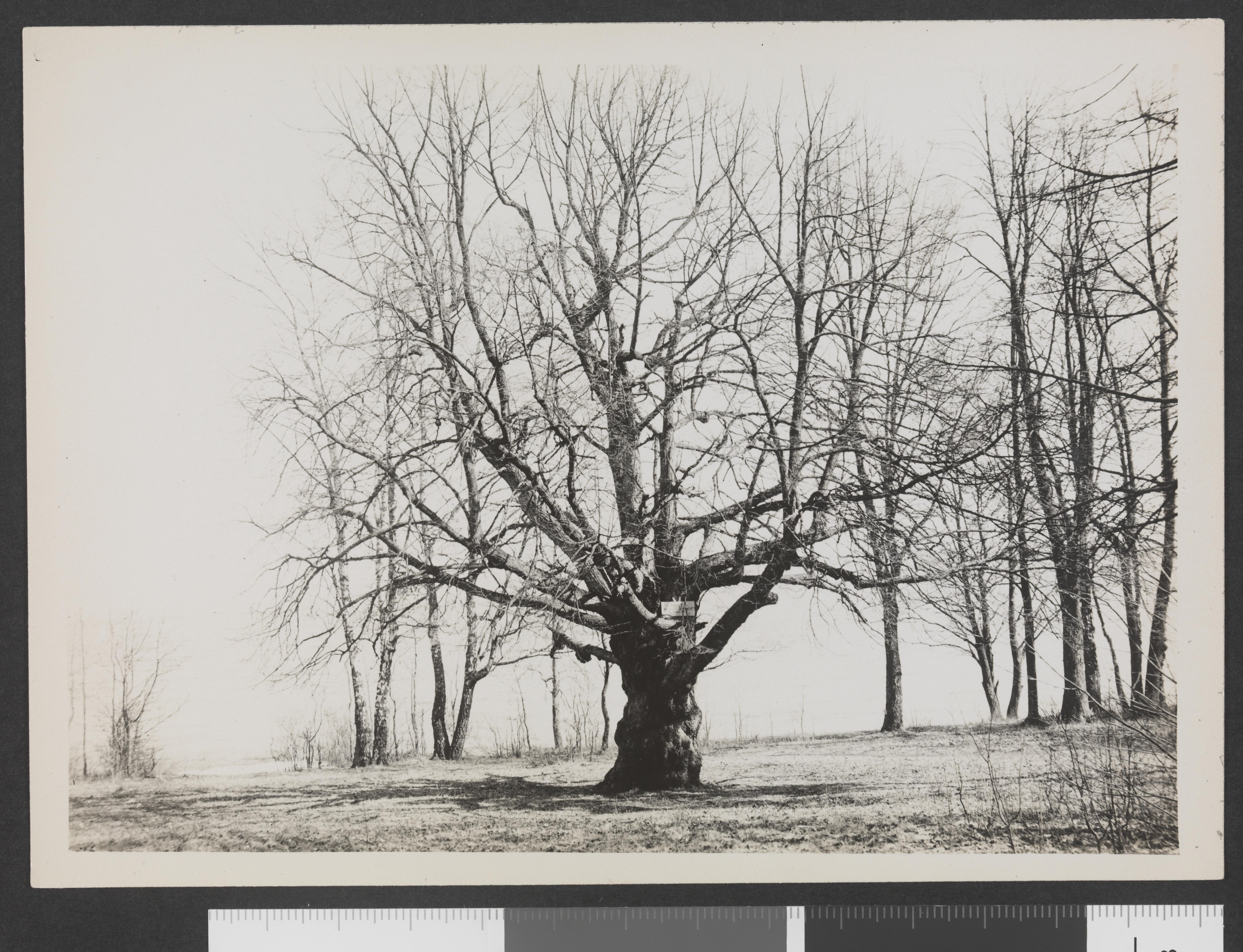
12 April 1927

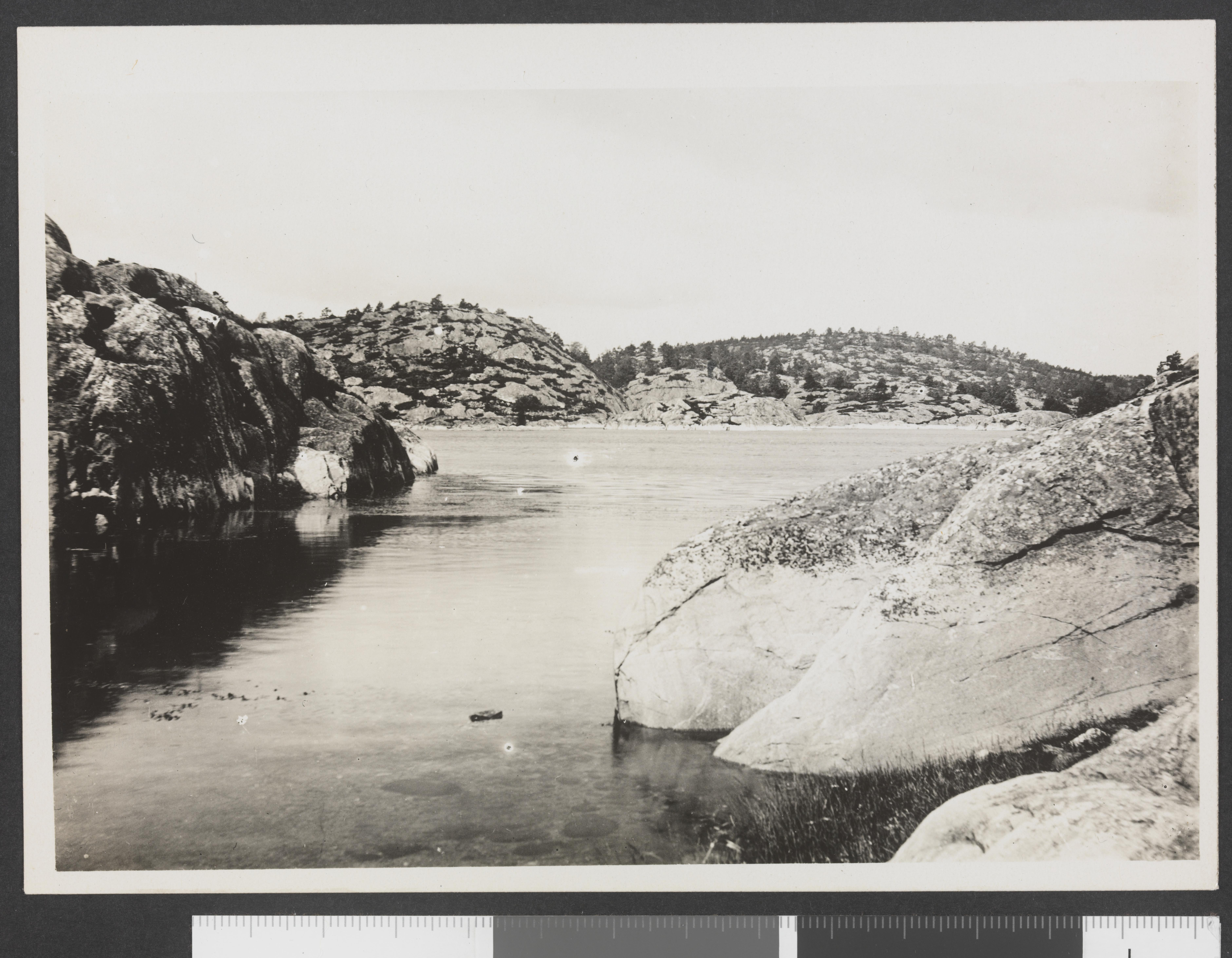
1920. Klingsund og Jæren

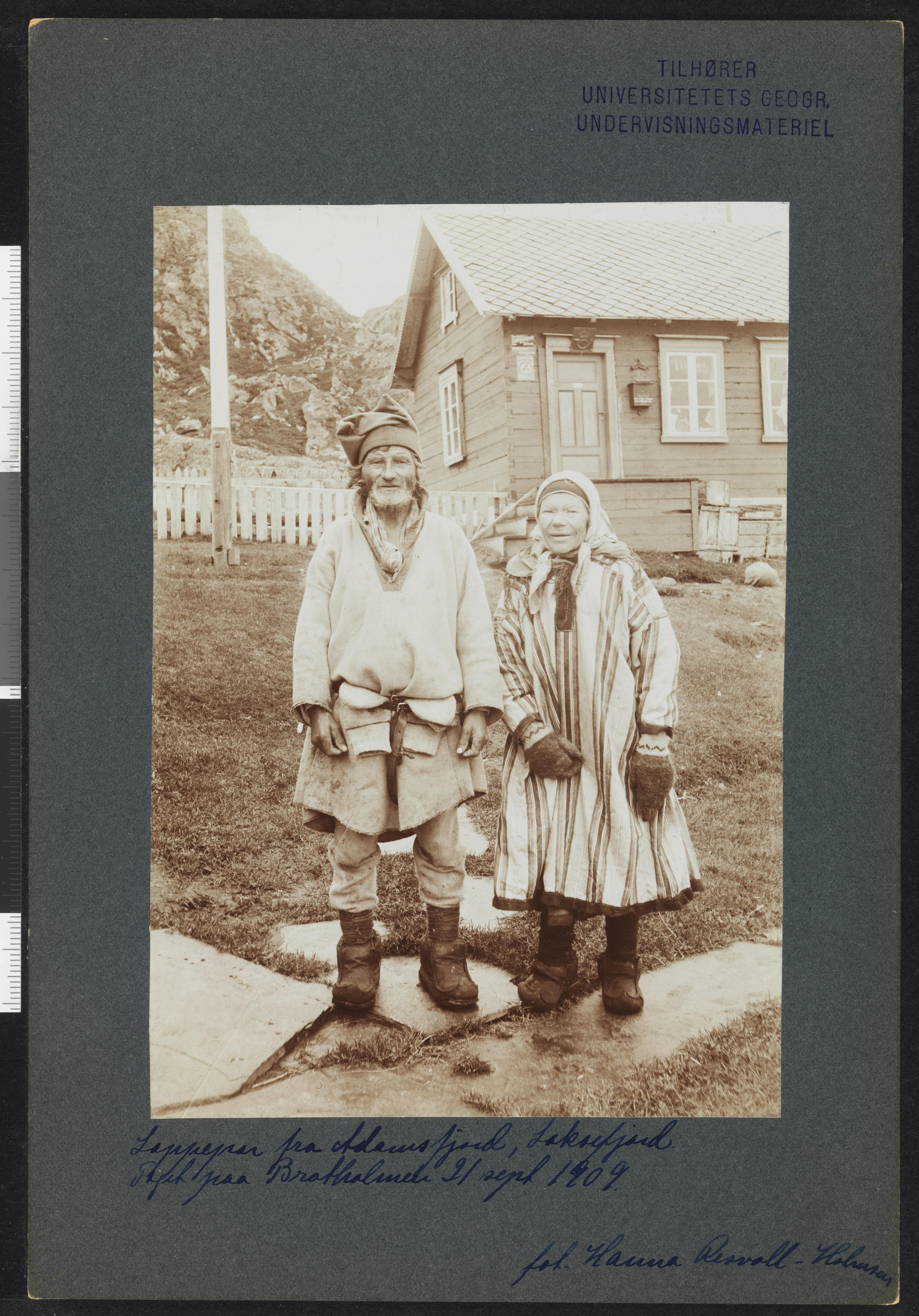
21 September 1909

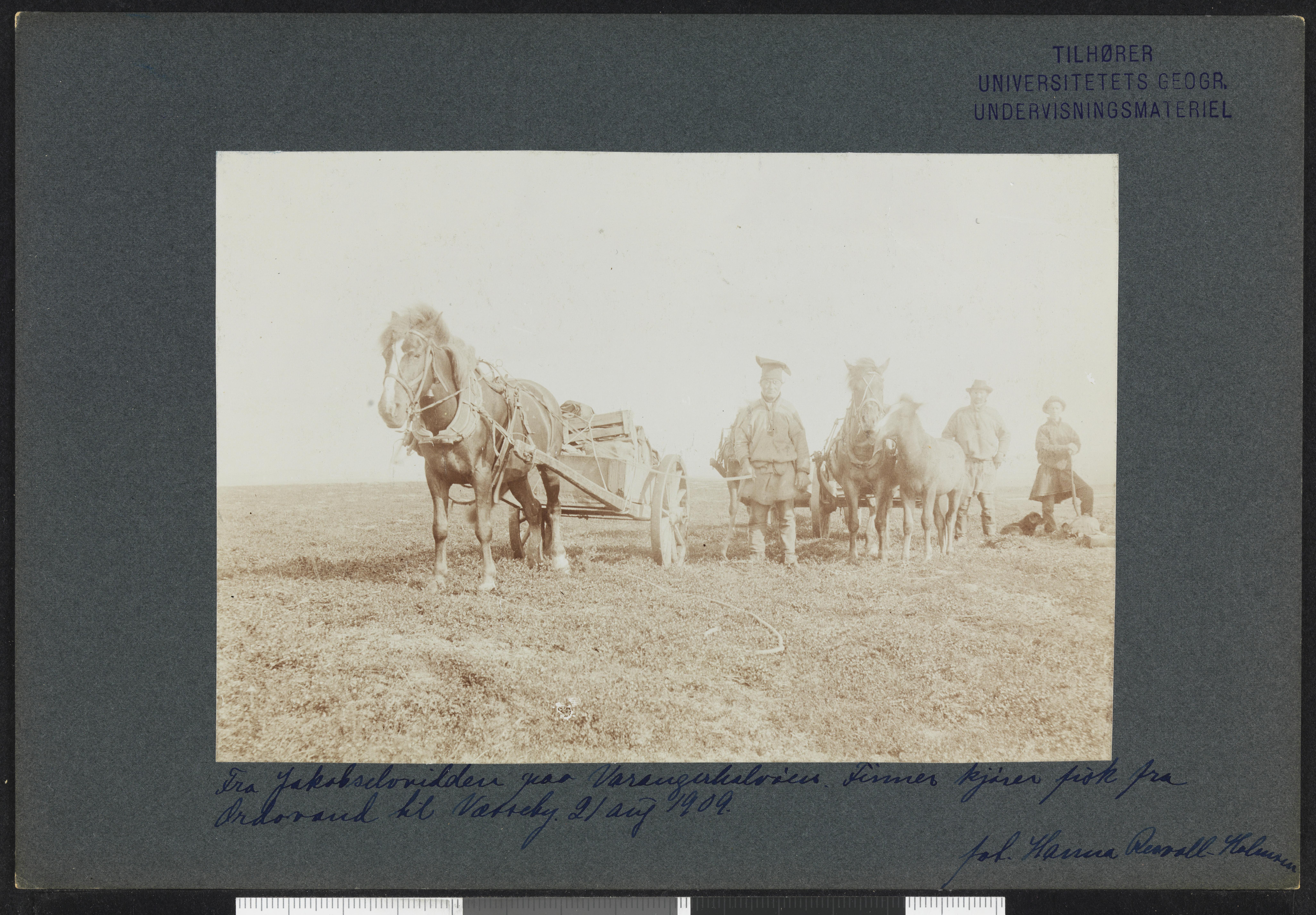
21 August 1909

== Selected scientific works ==
- Les observations botaniques de la campagne scientifique de S.A.S. le Prince Albert 1er de Monaco. La misión Isachsen au Spitzberg 1907. Monaco, 1910.
- Om Fjeldvegetationen i det Østenfjeldske Norge. Arkiv for matematik og naturvidenskap 1920/No. 2.
- Svalbards Flora - med en del om dens plantevekst i nutid og fortid. 56 pp. 1927.
- Om betydningen av det uensartede i våre skoger. Tidsskrift for Skogbruk 1932, 40: 270-275.

== Sources ==
- Obituary by Christophersen, E. in Blyttia 1: 100-102 (1943).
- Eckblad, F.-E. (1991) Thekla Resvoll og Hanna Resvoll-Holmsen, to glemte? Pionerer i norsk botanikk. Blyttia 49: 3-10.
- Biography by Bredo Berntsen & Inger Nordal in Norsk biografisk leksikon, Oslo: Kunnskapsforlaget (1999–2005)
- Berntsen, Bredo (2006) En grønnstrømpe og hennes samtid: Hanna Resvoll-Holmsen: botaniker, Svalbard-forsker, fjellelsker, fotograf og naturvernpioner. ISBN 82-8030-008-2
