= Matthias Numsen Blytt =

Norwegian botanist (1789–1862)

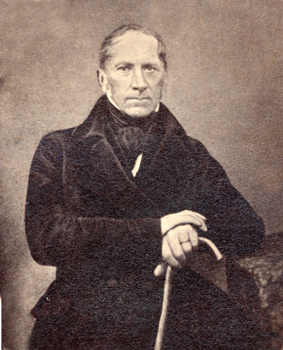
Matthias Numsen Blytt

Matthias Numsen Blytt (26 April 1789 – 26 June 1862) was a Norwegian botanist. He was born at Overhalla in Nordre Trondheim county, Norway. He attended the University of Christiania (now University of Oslo) and the University of Copenhagen. Blytt was professor of botany at the University of Oslo. In 1856 Rudolph Friedrich Hohenacker issued the exsiccata M. N. Blytt Pl. Norvegiae [praesertim alpium, rariores] with plant specimens collected by Blytt.
