= Sơn Dương district =

Coordinates: 21.667°N 105.417°E

Sơn Dương district Huyện Sơn Dương
- District
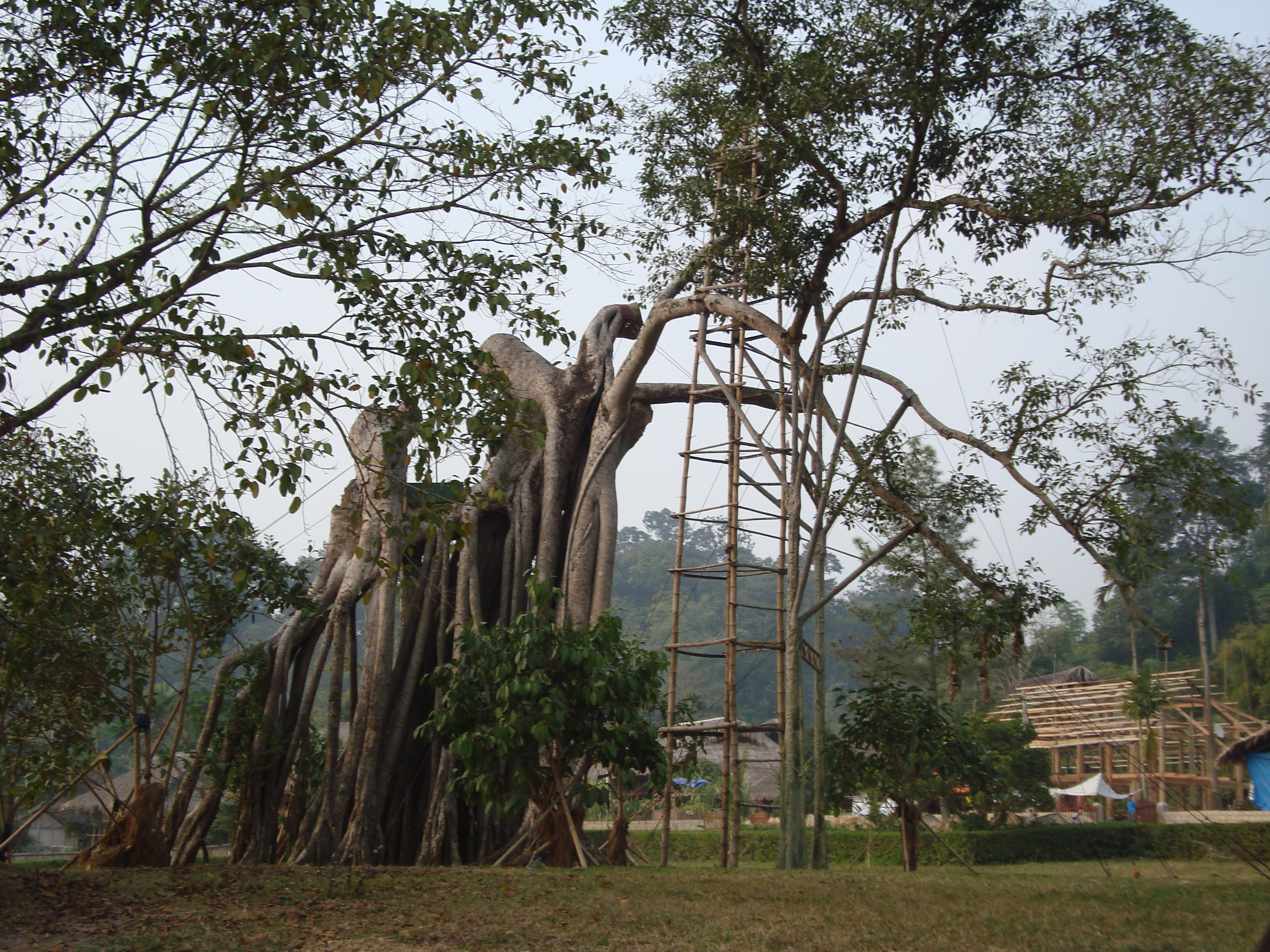
- Tân Trào Banyan Tree

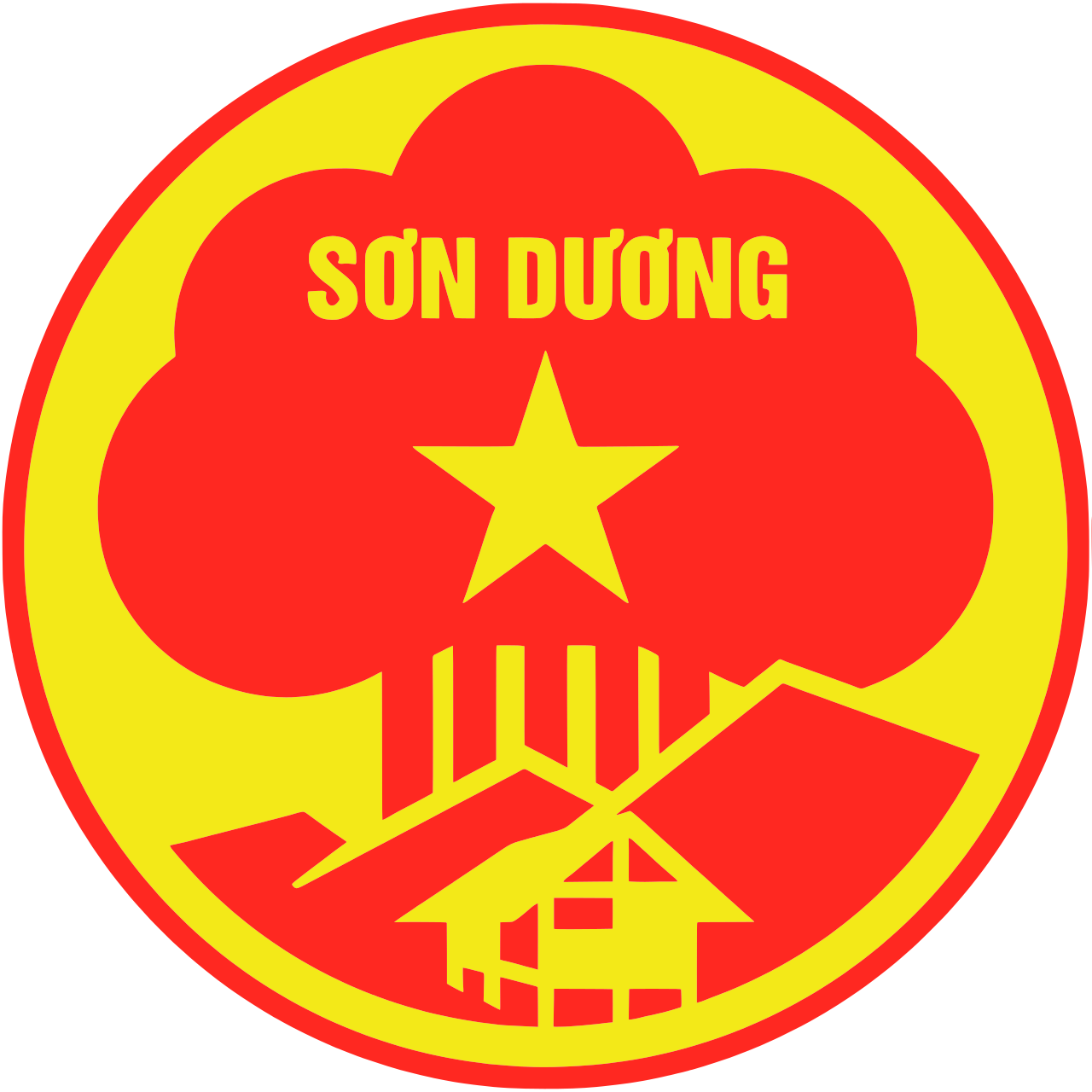
- Seal
- Interactive map of Sơn Dương district
- Country: Vietnam
- Region: Northeast
- Province: Tuyên Quang
- Capital: Sơn Dương

Area
  - Total: 305 sq mi (789 km^{2})

Population (2019)
  - Total: 183,600
  - Density: 603/sq mi (233/km^{2})
- Time zone: UTC+7 (UTC + 7)

Sơn Dương is a former rural district of Tuyên Quang province in the Northeast region of Vietnam. As of 2019 the district had a population of 183,600. The district covers an area of 789 km^{2}. The district capital lies at Sơn Dương.
