= Ana Petra Pérez Florido =

Spanish religious sister

Blessed Ana Petra Pérez Florido
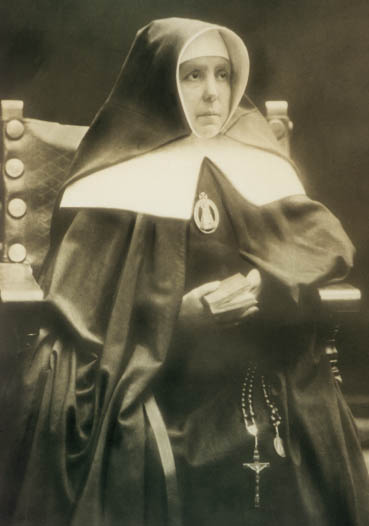
- Portrait of Petra de San José around 1900

Virgin
- Born: 6 December 1845; Valle de Abdalajís, Kingdom of Spain
- Died: 16 August 1906 (aged 60); Barcelona, Kingdom of Spain
- Venerated in: Roman Catholic Church
- Beatified: 16 October 1994, Saint Peter's Square, Vatican City by Pope John Paul II
- Feast: 16 August
- Patronage: Mothers of the Forsaken and St. Joseph of the Mountain

Ana Petra Pérez Florido (6 December 1845 – 16 August 1906), religious name Petra of Saint Joseph, was a Spanish religious sister. She established the Congregation of the Mothers of the Forsaken and St. Joseph of the Mountain (Madres de los Desamparados y San José de la Montaña) to care for the abandoned as well as the elderly and infirm. Pope John Paul II beatified her on 16 October 1994.

== Life ==
Ana Petra Pérez Florido was born on December 6, 1845, in Spain and was the last of five children to José Perez and Maria Florido; she was baptized with the name of "Ana Josefa".

Her mother died when she was three and her paternal grandmother, Teresa Reina, was interested in her education and so assumed control of her education. From her she learnt about the importance of the Eucharist as well as a devotion to the Mother of God as well as a special devotion to Saint Joseph. Twice two men of good families asked her for marriage but her father rejected such proposals for political reasons. It was all to her relief for she said: "I have no vocation for marriage". True to her word she declined all future opportunities for marriage and her parents did not respond well to her refusals and were even harsher when she informed her parents of her desire to join religious life as a servant of God.

Her parents attempted to prevent her from responding to her vocation and she could not enter the Congregation of the Little Sisters of the Poor due to their interference. In 1872 her father relented and gave her his blessing for joining the religious life; her father died on 11 January 1875. Florido at once began catering to the needs of the old and the abandoned and soon town officials requested that she open a house for the old which she did this on 19 March 1875; the home was named "The Porch of Bethlehem".

She entered a convent of the Mercedarians and received their habit on 1 November 1878. Soon, she decided to leave and establish a new congregation to which approval was granted on 25 December 1880. In 1891, when she made her first vows, she assumed the religious name Petra of Saint Joseph. The local bishop granted his approval of the new congregation at the beginning of 1883 and Pope Leo XIII granted his formal approval of the order in 1891. On 23 March 1891, Pérez Florido had set off for Rome to ask the pope to grant papal approval to the congregation and on arrival met with Cardinal Isidoro Verga. Her group then met with the pope and attended Mass where she received the Eucharist from him.

Pérez Florido made her perpetual vows on 15 October 1891. In 1883 she opened both a kindergarten and hospital in Ronda and later opened two houses; one in Andujar in 1885 and one in Martos in 1887.

Pérez Florido died on 16 August 1906 in Barcelona and her funeral was held on 18 August. Her remains were transferred elsewhere on 5 November 1920 but disappeared during the Spanish Civil War. The remains were found in 1983 and reburied on 10 June 1984.

== Beatification ==
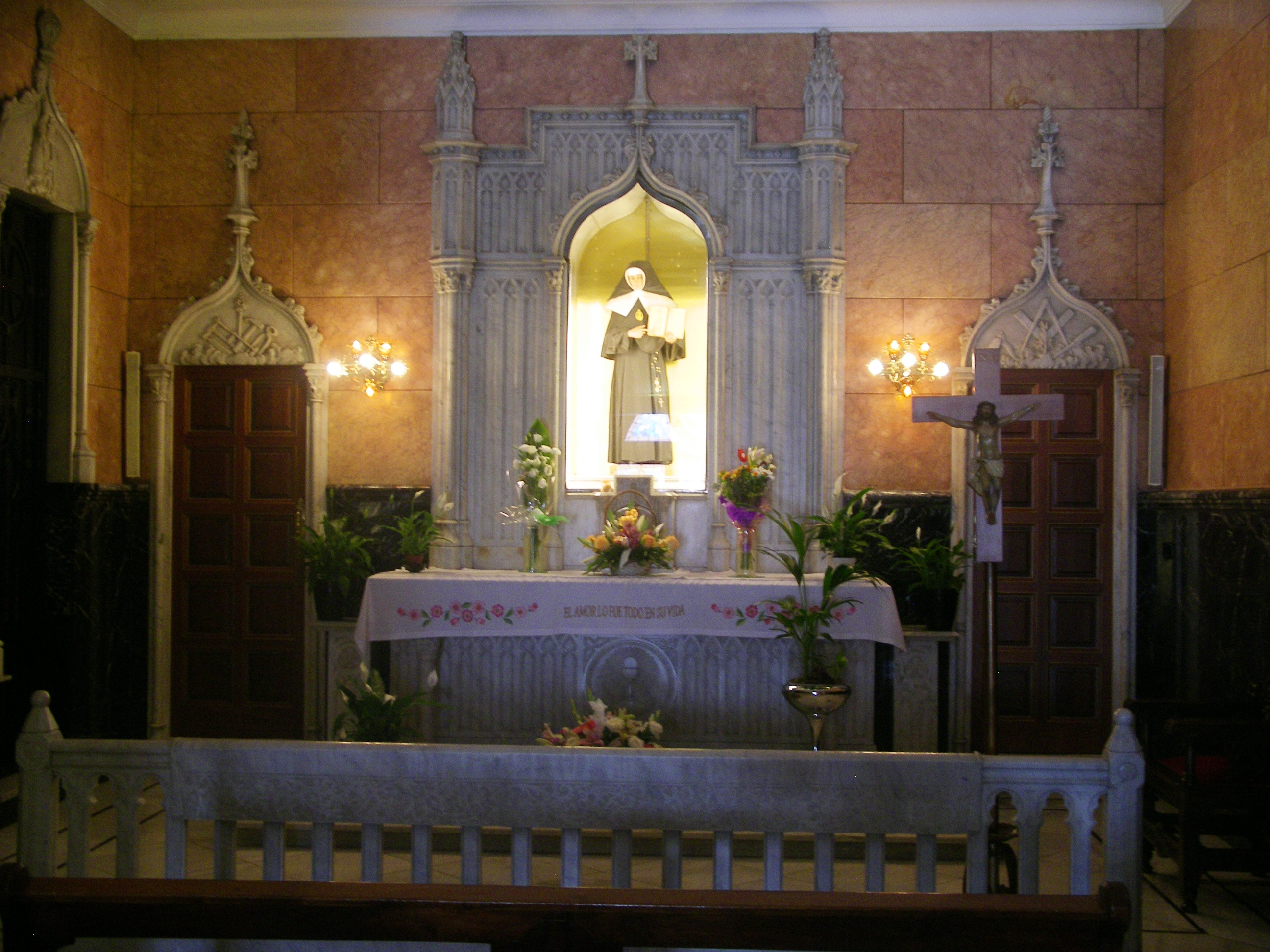
Chapel with the tomb of the Blessed at the Real Santuario San José de la Montaña in Barcelona

The Beatification process commenced in the Barcelona archdiocese in an informative process that opened in 1932. It concluded its work, the accumulation of all documentation and witness testimonies, in 1933. Florido's spiritual writings were approved by theologians on 26 February 1942, and her cause was formally opened on 3 December 1944, granting her the title of Servant of God.

The second process in Barcelona continued the work of the first process in 1948 and it concluded in 1949. The formal decree of ratification of both processes came from the Congregation for Rites on 4 May 1952 and it ensured that the cause proceeded to the next stage.

The Congregation for the Causes of Saints and their consultants approved the cause on 16 December 1969 while the Congregation alone approved it sometime later on 15 December 1970. On 14 June 1971 Florido was proclaimed to be venerable after Pope Paul VI recognized that she had lived a life of heroic virtue. On 6 July 1993 Pope John Paul II approved a miracle that was attributed to the invocation of Ana Petra Pérez Florido and beatified her in Saint Peter's Square on 16 October 1994.
