= Sơn Dương =

- Commune
- Interactive map of Sơn Dương
- Coordinates: 21°41′33″N 105°23′59″E
- Country: Vietnam
- Region: Northeast
- Province: Tuyên Quang
- Established: 16 June 2025
- Administrative headquarters: An Kỳ Hamlet

Area
  - Total: 123.17 km^{2} (47.56 sq mi)

Population (2025)
  - Total: 41,954
  - Density: 341/km^{2} (880/sq mi)

Sơn Dương is a commune in Tuyên Quang province, Vietnam.

== History ==
The area of present-day Sơn Dương Commune was formerly located in Sơn Dương district, Tuyên Quang province.

On 16 June 2025, the Standing Committee of the National Assembly of Vietnam issued Resolution No. 1684/NQ-UBTVQH15 on the arrangement of commune-level administrative units in Tuyên Quang province in 2025. Under the resolution, the entire area and population of Sơn Dương Township and Hợp Thành, Phúc Ứng, and Tú Thịnh communes were merged to form a new commune named Sơn Dương.
