= Xicolatada =

Traditional festival in France

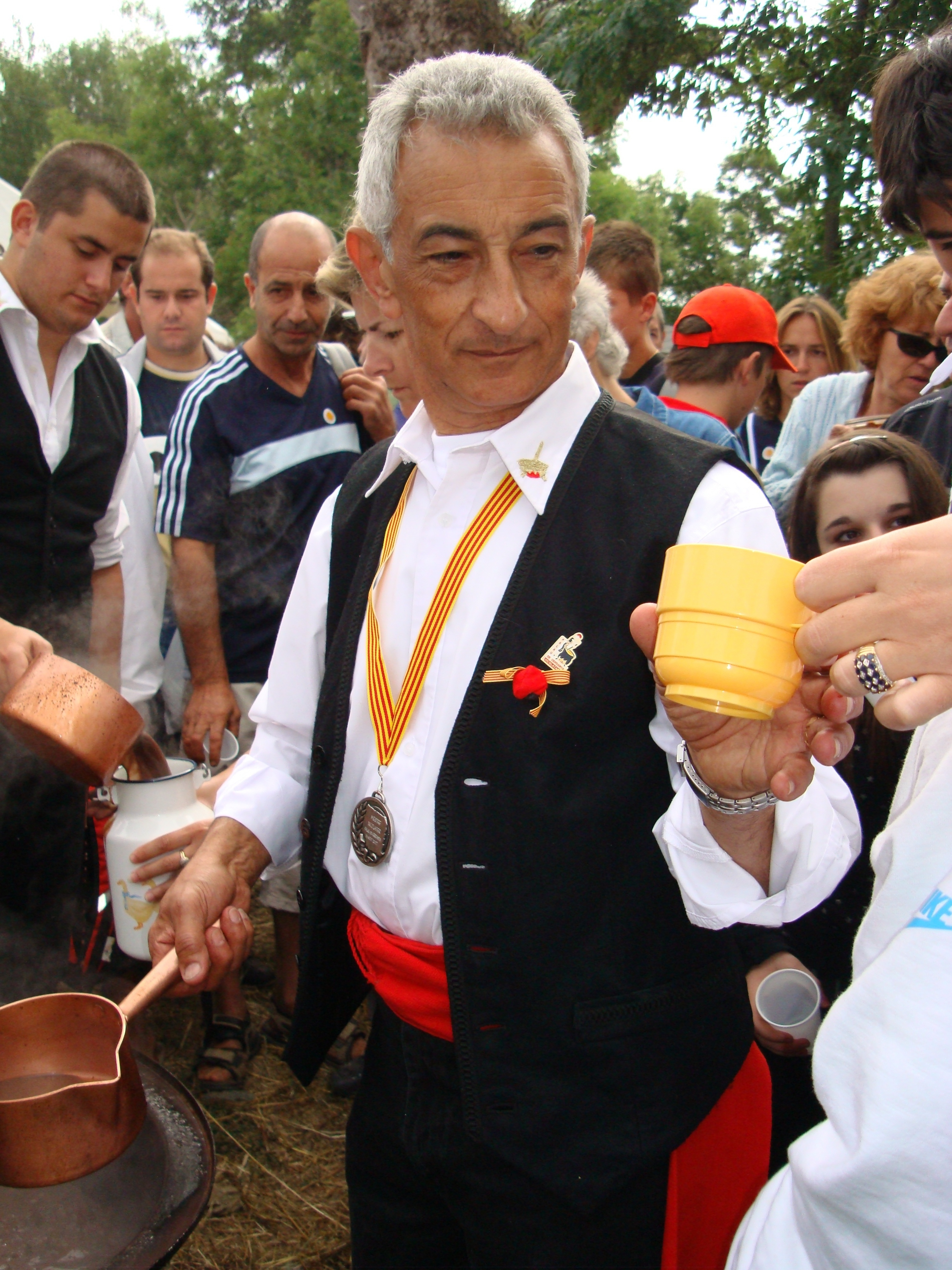
Xicolatada

The Xicolatada (Catalan pronunciation: [ʃikuləˈtaðə]; French pronunciation: [ʃikɔlatada]) is a traditional festival celebrated in the village of Palau-de-Cerdagne in Languedoc-Roussillon. It is celebrated yearly on 16 August, and has been for over 300 years.

In Catalonia, 15 August was once a festival day, and the locals would drink quite a bit, to the point that they felt a bit ill the following morning. To help them feel better, the village chocolatier would offer them a hot chocolate, which he claimed was an excellent remedy. Over the years, this habit grew into a custom, and eventually a municipal association was formed to remember the tradition and to organise the distribution of hot chocolate every year on 16 August, at precisely 11 in the morning. Today, the chocolate is brewed in large cauldrons over a wood fire. In 2007, 800 litres were consumed by 3000 people, many of whom were visitors; the festival draws many tourists to the village every year. To preserve the tradition, festival organisers have created a sort of confraternity called the Mestres xicolaters, or "master chocolatiers", who keep the recipes for the chocolate secret; the organisation also handles scheduling, which it does not reveal in advance.
