= Palau-de-Cerdagne =

Palau-de-Cerdagne Palau de Cerdanya
- Commune
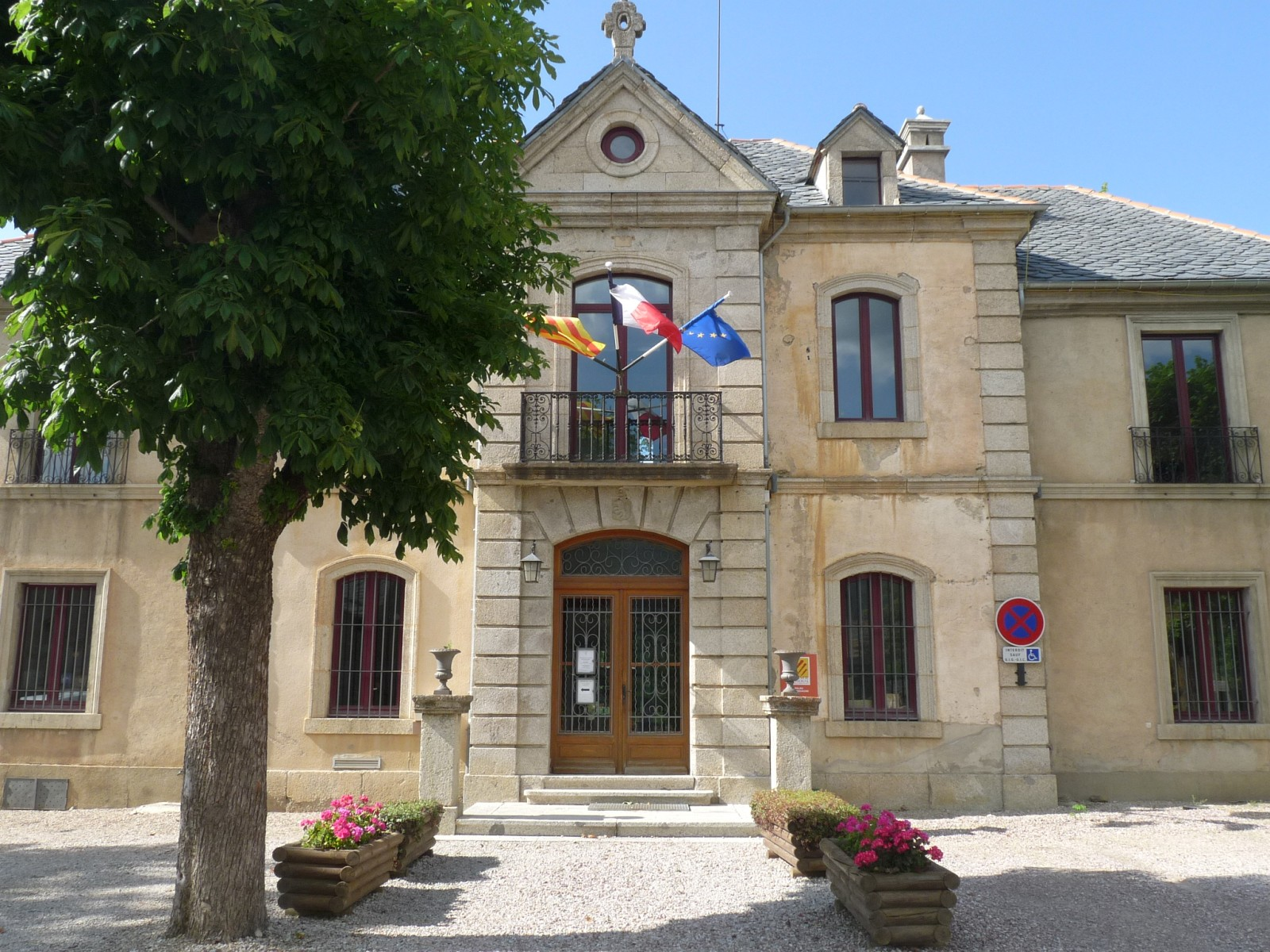
- The town hall in Palau-de-Cerdagne

- Coat of arms
- Location of Palau-de-Cerdagne
- Location within France Location within Occitanie
- Coordinates: 42°25′00″N 1°58′02″E
- Country: France
- Region: Occitania
- Department: Pyrénées-Orientales
- Arrondissement: Prades
- Canton: Les Pyrénées catalanes
- Intercommunality: Pyrénées Cerdagne

Government
  - Mayor (2020–2026): Stéphane Surroque
- Area^{1}: 11.50 km^{2} (4.44 sq mi)
- Elevation: 1,270 m (4,170 ft)
- Highest elevation: 2,203 m (7,228 ft)
- Lowest elevation: 1,151 m (3,776 ft)
- Population (2023): 405
  - Density: 35.2/km^{2} (91.2/sq mi)
- Time zone: UTC+01:00 (CET)
  - Summer (DST): UTC+02:00 (CEST)
- INSEE/Postal code: 66132 /66340
- ^{1} French Land Register data, which excludes lakes, ponds, glaciers > 1 km^{2} (0.386 sq mi or 247 acres) and river estuaries.

Palau-de-Cerdagne (French pronunciation: [palo də sɛʁdaɲ], literally Palau of Cerdagne; Catalan: Palau de Cerdanya) is a commune in the eastern Pyrenees (Pyrénées-Orientales department in southern France).

The people of the town celebrate the Xicolatada, every year, on the 16th of August.

== Geography ==
Palau-de-Cerdagne is located in the canton of Les Pyrénées catalanes and in the arrondissement of Prades.

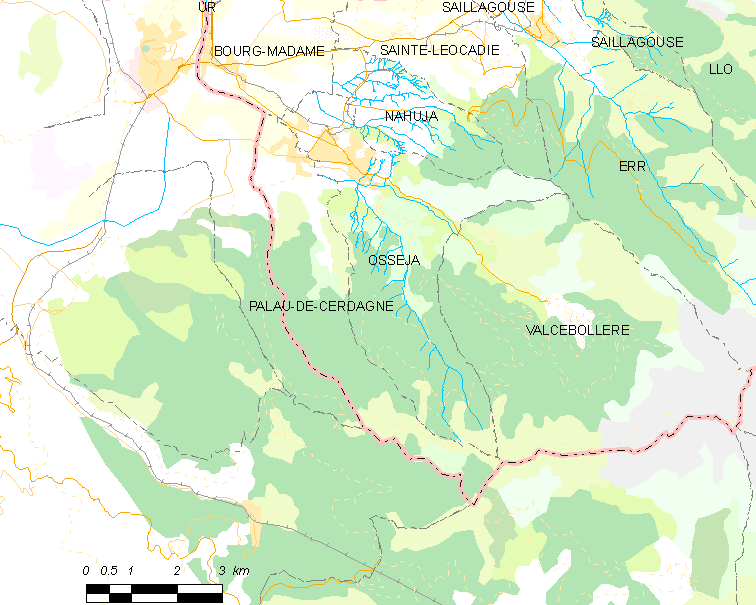
Map of Palau-de-Cerdagne and its surrounding communes

== Population ==
Historical population
Year	Pop.	±% p.a.
1968	177	—
1975	237	+4.26%
1982	285	+2.67%
1990	275	−0.45%
1999	424	+4.93%
2007	516	+2.49%
2012	444	−2.96%
2017	408	−1.68%
2023	405	−0.12%
Source: INSEE

== See also ==
- Communes of the Pyrénées-Orientales department
