= All Hyderabad Trade Union Congress =

Trade union in the Indian state of Hyderabad

AHTUC
- All Hyderabad Trade Union Congress
- Founded: 1946
- Location: India
- Members: 72,000
- Key people: Makhdoom Mohiuddin, president, Raj Bahadur Gour, general secretary
- Affiliations: All India Trade Union Congress

The All Hyderabad Trade Union Congress (AHTUC) was a trade union centre in the Hyderabad State. Affiliated to the All India Trade Union Congress, it claimed a membership of around 72,000. The trade union centre, which was aligned with the Communist Party of India, was one of the organisations that took part in the Telangana Rebellion against the Nizam regime.

== Foundation ==
The founding of the AHTUC was preceded by a Marathwada Labour Conference held in Aurangabad on 30 November 1945. The conference was organized by unions which were under the leadership of the Communist Party. The conference elected a provisional committee for the formation of a new trade union centre in the Hyderabad State. The founding meeting of the AHTUC was held in Secunderabad on 16–18 August 1946. The new union centre was inaugurated by the veteran trade union leader N.M. Joshi, who was the general secretary of the AITUC. The founding president Makhdoom Mohiuddin of the AHTUC, who had an arrest warrant against him and lived underground, was arrested immediately after the meeting. He was later released.

Upon its foundation, the new organization affiliated itself with the AITUC. The Singareni Collieries Workers Union, a union organising labourers in the Singareni coal fields, was affiliated itself to the AHTUC.

== Leadership ==
The Urdu poet Makhdoom Mohiuddin was the founding president of the AHTUC, whilst Raj Bahadur Gour was the founding general secretary of the organisation. Sayed Makhdoom served as vice president of the AHTUC.

== Crackdown ==
Soon after the formation of the new trade union centre one of its affiliates, the electricity workers union led by B.S. Madhav Singh, broke away from the AHTUC and instead joined the socialist trade union centre Hind Mazdoor Sabha.

In August 1946, the regime began a crackdown on the AHTUC. AHTUC responded by issuing a call to celebrate 17 October 1946 as 'Anti-Repression Day'. This appeal resulted in yet intensified repression on behalf of the Nizam regime. On 30 September 1946 police conducted raids on some 150 houses in Hyderabad, Secunderabad and other areas in Telangana belonging to unions, parties and individual leaders that were taking part in the preparations for the 17 October protests. Large amounts of correspondence of the trade union movement were seized in the raids. Police forces were also deployed in industrial areas to hinder workers from gathering to rally against the actions of the government.

Police raided the Singareni Collieries Workers Union office in Kothagudem on 12 February 1947. Workers rallied to protest the leaders of the union and help them escape. In total, 20 workers were arrested. They were sentenced to six months' imprisonment each. In the coming months the main leaders of the union were captured and jailed, and the union office was shut down.

== Resistance struggle ==
As the Nizam declared Hyderabad as an independent state in September 1947, Makhdoom Mohiuddin was one of the signatories of a joint declaration of the Communist Party, Andhra Maha Sabha and the AHTUC calling for armed insurrection against the Nizam's rule for the integration of Hyderabad in the Indian Union (Mohiuddin signed on behalf of AHTUC). Armed struggle began in Telangana.

In December 1948 the municipal workers union affiliated to AHTUC, led by Amarnath Burman, went on strike.

== People's Democratic Front ==
In 1950 the AHTUC was one of the founding organizations of the People's Democratic Front.
