= L-8 =

U.S. Navy blimp whose two-man crew disappeared in 1942

L-8 "Ghost Blimp" incident
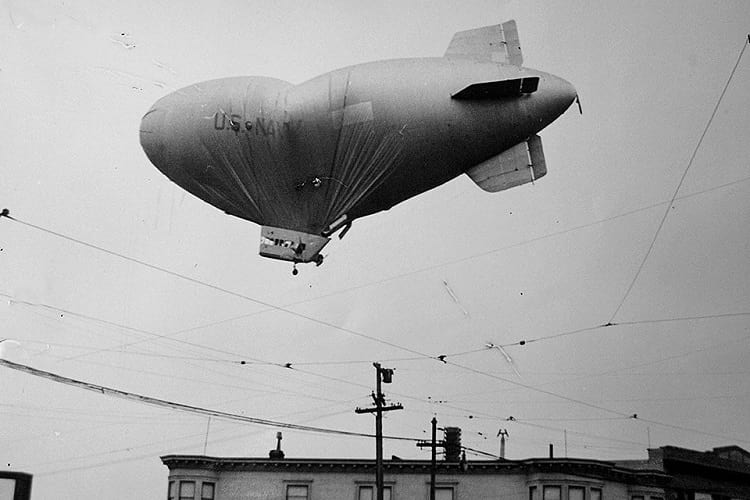
- The abandoned L-8, floating over San Francisco after the disappearance of its crew and showing damage sustained from impacting the ground at Ocean Beach.

Occurrence
- Date: 16 August 1942; 84 years, 2 months ago
- Summary: Cause unknown, aircraft recovered
- Site: Pacific Ocean, off the coast of San Francisco, California, U.S.

Aircraft
- Aircraft type: L-class blimp
- Operator: United States Navy
- Registration: L-8
- Flight origin: Treasure Island, San Francisco, California, U.S.
- Destination: Treasure Island, San Francisco, California, U.S.
- Occupants: 2
- Passengers: 0
- Crew: 2
- Fatalities: 2 (presumed)
- Survivors: 0 (presumed)

L-8, later renamed America and popularly known as the "Ghost Blimp", was a United States Navy L-class airship whose two crewmen disappeared over the Pacific Ocean on August 16, 1942. At 11:15 a.m., several hours after the airship lifted off from Treasure Island, San Francisco, California, L-8 reappeared off the shore of Ocean Beach near Fort Funston. L-8 briefly made contact with the ground at Ocean Beach, causing damage to the airship, then drifted over San Francisco and crashed on Bellevue Avenue, Daly City. No traces of its crewmen, Lieutenant Ernest DeWitt Cody and Ensign Charles Adams, have ever been found.

== Background ==
The L-class was a series of non-rigid airships (blimps), produced for the United States Navy in 1937, based upon the small commercial blimps produced by the Goodyear Aircraft Company that were used for advertising purposes.

After the United States declared war on Japan in response to the attack on Pearl Harbor, the Imperial Japanese Navy sank at least half a dozen Allied ships off the West Coast over a period of several months. By August 1942, Japanese submarines had shelled Ellwood Oil Field in California and Fort Stevens in Oregon. Heightened fears of an invasion had also prompted the Battle of Los Angeles, in which a false alarm was raised over what later was determined to be a weather balloon.

One of the responses by the Navy included a takeover of Goodyear's five-airship fleet, operating them out of the Navy's two major lighter-than-air bases at Lakehurst in New Jersey and Moffett Field in California. These Goodyear blimps were incorporated into an "L-class" with designations L-4 through L-8. While they were too small for any extensive operational use, the blimps were considered ideal for training missions and coastal antisubmarine patrols.

Sources differ as to whether L-8 had been named Rainbow or Ranger prior to its Navy service. (Note: This website claims that the blimp had previously been named Ranger, while this online history of Airship Patrol Squadron 32 claims it had been named Rainbow.) Several months prior to the incident, in April 1942, L-8 delivered vital B-25 modification parts to the aircraft carrier USS Hornet (CV-8) after she departed California carrying the Doolittle Raiders, ahead of their assault on Tokyo.

== Incident ==
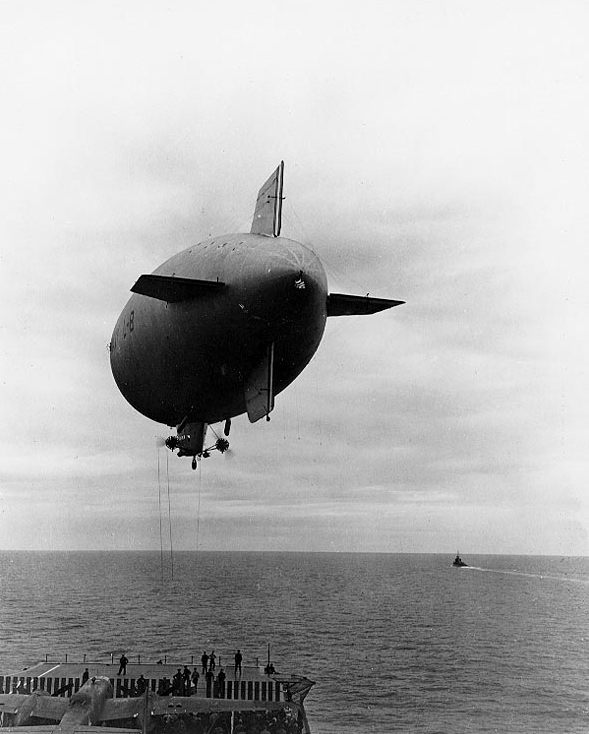
L-8 delivering B-25 modification parts to the aircraft carrier USS Hornet, April 1942

At 6:03 a.m., on August 16, 1942, L-8 – having been assigned to Airship Patrol Squadron 32 – lifted off from Treasure Island, San Francisco, on a coastal antisubmarine patrol. Its scheduled route would have taken the airship over the Farallon Islands, Point Reyes, and the locality of Montara before circling back towards the Golden Gate Bridge. Inside the gondola were Lieutenant Ernest DeWitt Cody, aged 27, and his co-pilot, Ensign Charles Adams, aged 35; it was Adams's first flight as a commissioned officer. L-8 was armed with two depth charges and one .30-caliber machine gun. At the time of the incident, the airship had made 1,092 previous trips without incident and had recently been inspected. Conditions on the morning of the flight were clear.

At 7:38 a.m., L-8's crew radioed to Treasure Island and reported observing an oil slick 4 miles (6.4 km) off the coast of the Farallon Islands. A Liberty ship and a fishing boat in the area both witnessed L-8 descending to within 30 feet (9.1 m) of the ocean surface and circling the oil slick. This would constitute the last confirmed sighting of the airship with the crew aboard. Controllers at Treasure Island lost contact with the crew at 8:50 a.m. Shortly after 9:00 a.m., L-8 dumped ballast, ascended and headed east toward San Francisco – contrary to its intended course towards Point Reyes, which was to the northwest.

At 11:15 a.m., L-8 reappeared off the coast of Ocean Beach near Fort Funston and drifted towards the coastline at low elevation. The airship touched down on the beach, where two surf fishermen tried to hold it down by its mooring ropes. Upon looking inside the gondola, the fishermen observed that no crew were inside. As the fishermen were unable to hold the airship down any longer, they released it and the ship rose briefly into the air before running into a sloping cliff, causing damage to its starboard propeller and dislodging one depth charge, relieving it of enough weight to gain altitude. An automatic valve inside L-8 was opened and began releasing helium gas, causing the weight of the gondola to give the envelope a sagging V-shaped appearance as it deflated. L-8 drifted inland over the Olympic Club golf course and Mission Street, attracting the attention of a large crowd of onlookers who followed its journey. Floating over San Francisco's Crocker-Amazon neighborhood, the airship lost elevation and began scraping telephone poles and residential houses. L-8 finally crashed in the street in front of a house at 419 Bellevue Avenue, Daly City.

== Investigation ==
Police and military personnel immediately descended upon the crash site. While the gondola doors were found hanging open, and the crash had been so gentle that the crewmen would have walked away unharmed, neither Cody nor Adams was found inside. Searches of the coastline from air, land and sea found no trace of the missing pilots, and the search was abandoned on August 18. Authorities initially theorized that Cody and Adams had bailed out of L-8 over the ocean, but all three parachutes and a rubber life raft were found aboard the gondola. Furthermore, the airship's radio and engines were switched on and no distress transmissions had been sent, indicating that the crewmen's disappearance had been abrupt. A board of investigation convened by the Navy could only determine that L-8 had not been shot down, burned or made contact with the ocean, and that Cody and Adams had not engaged in misconduct. Cody and Adams were declared legally dead in 1943.

The official theory was that in order to deploy a smoke marker at the site of the oil slick, one crew member had opened the rear hatch of the gondola. He then slipped and, dangling from the hatch, shouted for assistance. When the other crew member attempted rescue, both pilots fell into the ocean. The sudden loss of weight would have caused the derelict L-8 to gain altitude. Outside of official circles, various scenarios were immediately put forward attempting to explain the circumstances of the blimp's mysterious flight. This included speculation that the two men had either been captured by the crew of a Japanese submarine or had defected to Japan; that their disappearance was the result of an elaborate desertion scheme gone awry; or other more outlandish scenarios, such as an alien abduction.

== Aftermath ==
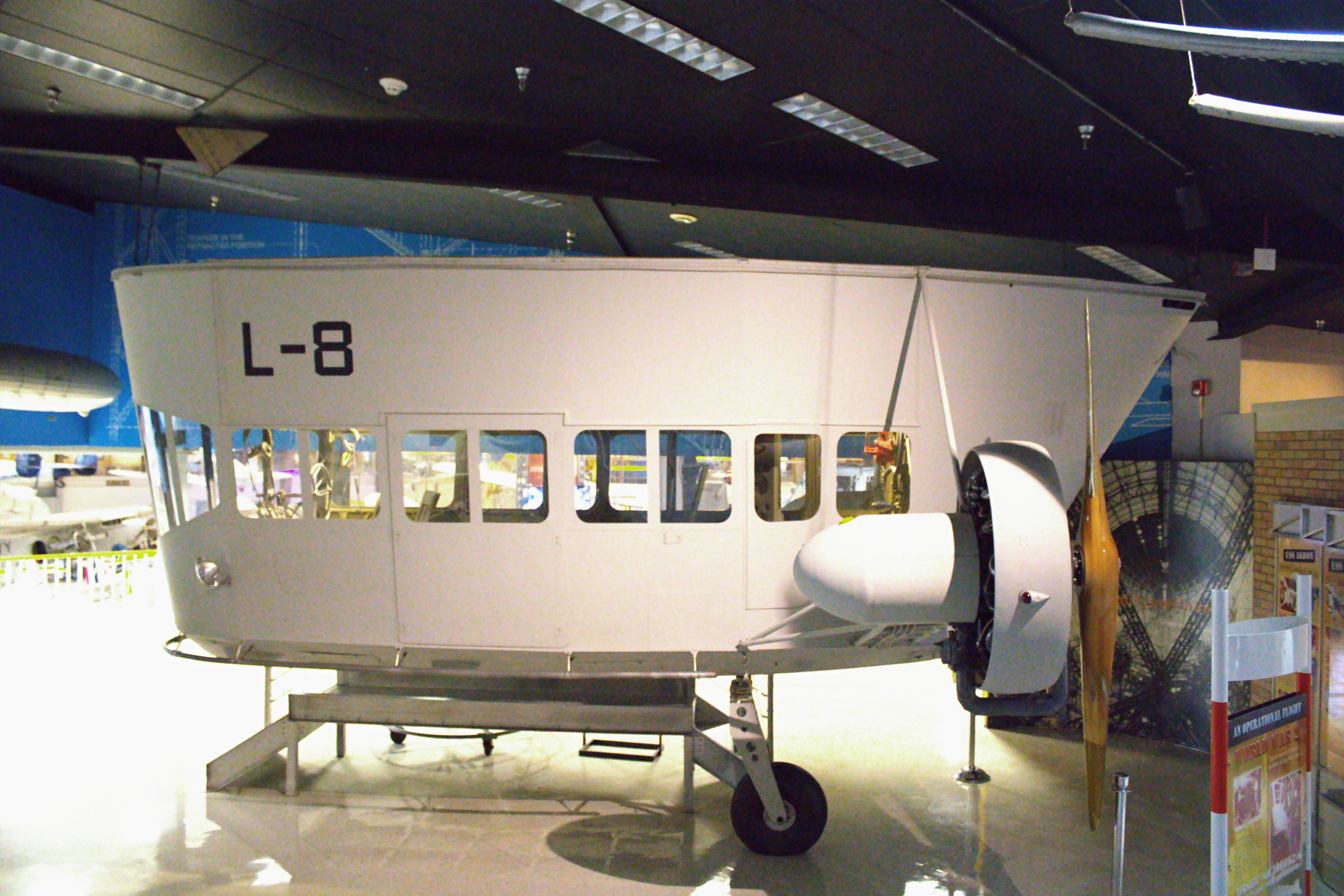
L-8's gondola at the National Naval Aviation Museum

L-8 was quickly repaired and returned to service following the incident. After the war, the gondola was sold back to Goodyear and in 1969 became America (N10A) as part of the company's advertising blimp fleet until it was retired in 1982. The gondola was then repainted back to its L-8 markings and given to the National Naval Aviation Museum in Pensacola, Florida, where it sits on static display.

== See also ==
- List of missing aircraft
- List of people who disappeared mysteriously at sea
- US Navy airships during World War II
