= Alpine groundsel =

Alpine groundsel is a common name for several plants and may refer to:

- Packera pauciflora, native to North America
- Scapisenecio pectinatus, native to Australia
