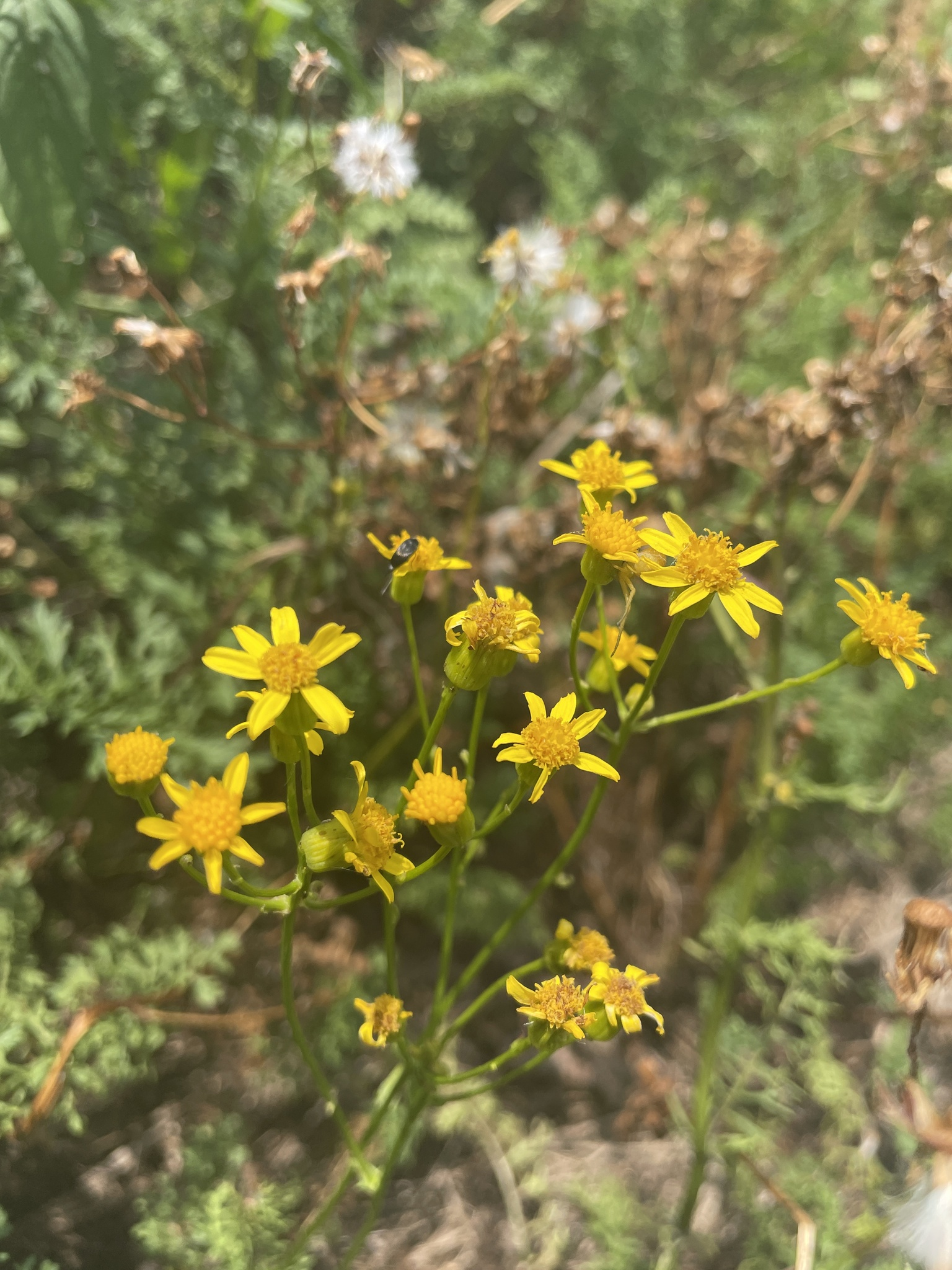

Conservation status
- Vulnerable (NatureServe)

Scientific classification
- Kingdom: Plantae
- Clade: Tracheophytes
- Clade: Angiosperms
- Clade: Eudicots
- Clade: Asterids
- Order: Asterales
- Family: Asteraceae
- Genus: Packera
- Species: P. millefolium

Binomial name
- Packera millefolium (Torr. & A.Gray) W.A.Weber & Á.Löve

Synonyms
- Senecio millefolium

= Packera millefolium =

Plant species in the daisy family

Packera millefolium, commonly known as Yarrowleaf Ragwort, Blue Ridge Groundsel, or Piedmont Ragwort is part of the Asteracea or Aster family. It is a perennial and belongs to the genus Packera. The species is endemic to the mainland United States, and it is found primarily in the Eastern United States. Populations range from as far west as the Appalachian to as far east as the Piedmont region. It is found on dry rocky surfaces, and it typically grows to be roughly 1 to 3 feet in height. Packera millefolium is known to hybridize, and can be toxic if consumed.

== Description ==
The plant grows to be between 12 and 32 inches in height. Leaves are simple with a basal arrangement. It has a set of leaves on the stem that are usually smaller in comparison to the lower leaves. The lower leaves get up to 12 inches long, and they have an alternate arrangement that's divided into narrow segments. Stems have woolly hair between the stem and the base. Stems grow upward and have a ribbed structure. Roots are fibrous. Flower heads have 8 to 13 yellow ray flowers, and darker yellow disk flowers on the center. Starts flowering from early May to mid June. It produces achenes when it fruits.

== Taxonomy ==
Packera millefolium was scientifically described by John Torrey and Asa Gray in 1843, naming it Senecio millefolium. The botanists William Alfred Weber and Áskell Löve moved it to the genus Packera in 1981 giving the species its accepted name. Together with its genus it is classified in the family Asteraceae.

== Habitat ==
The species is often found at higher elevations on dry and rocky surfaces such as cliffs, slopes, rocky outcrops, and granitic domes. Since it is a Ragwort, Packera millefolium, typically colonizes in patches in open habitats, and it thrives in environments that receive at least 870 mm of rainfall a year.

== Species interaction ==
P. millefolium is capable of both self-pollination and cross-pollination, so its flowers attract bees and butterflies that could aid in the plants pollination process. Butterflies land on the ray flowers in search of nectar while bees follow suit. Smaller insects frequently visit numerous flower heads in a short period of time which can aid in self-pollination. Larger insects travel greater distances and visit a wider variety of plants which can facilitate cross-pollination. Both instances are helpful since the species is a perennial herb that can seed and sexually reproduces. Often times, dispersal is carried out by wind, animals, and gravity.

Not many mammals have been known to feed on the species which is likely due to it being a Ragwort. Ragworts are known to exhibit toxic effects on animals that consume it. Effects can be very harmful, and even strong enough to cause death.

== Threats ==
This species faces a range of threats to its population due to various disturbances. One threat to the persistence of the species is the loss and degradation habitat land. In numerous locations in North and South Carolina, land surrounding outcrops are cleared or altered for agricultural development, road construction, or housing projects. Since the species growing in specific rocky habitats, land reduction could threaten population numbers. Increasing building density of the southern Appalachian could further contribute to decline in populations by fragmenting these habitats.

Human activity has also allowed for hybridization with similar species to occur as a result of contact with other more abundant species such as Packera anonyma. Hybridization creates the possibility of genetic assimilation of P. millefolium populations since hybrids do not carry on all the genetic characteristics from P. millefolium. Hybrids could also threaten populations of Packera milllefolium by outcompeting with the species.

Other less prominent threats include, trampling which can also take its toll on populations because the species resides in locations that are commonly visited by hikers. This also does not account for animals that may trample the plants in passing as well as the effects of erosion.

== Conservation and management ==
While there are many threats to Packera millefolium, recommended methods of management include removal of nearby populations of Packera anonyma in order to prevent hybridization. Removal could be followed by restocking the population with P. millefolium seeds. It would also be impactful to minimize construction of roads and other structures that would encroach upon rocky outcrops and granitic domes where the species is found. The most effective strategy would likely be to coordinate management and interference between land owners, private agencies, and public services. As for individuals, attempting to limit foot traffic, climbing, and hiking in areas where populations of Packera millefolium reside could be impactful.
