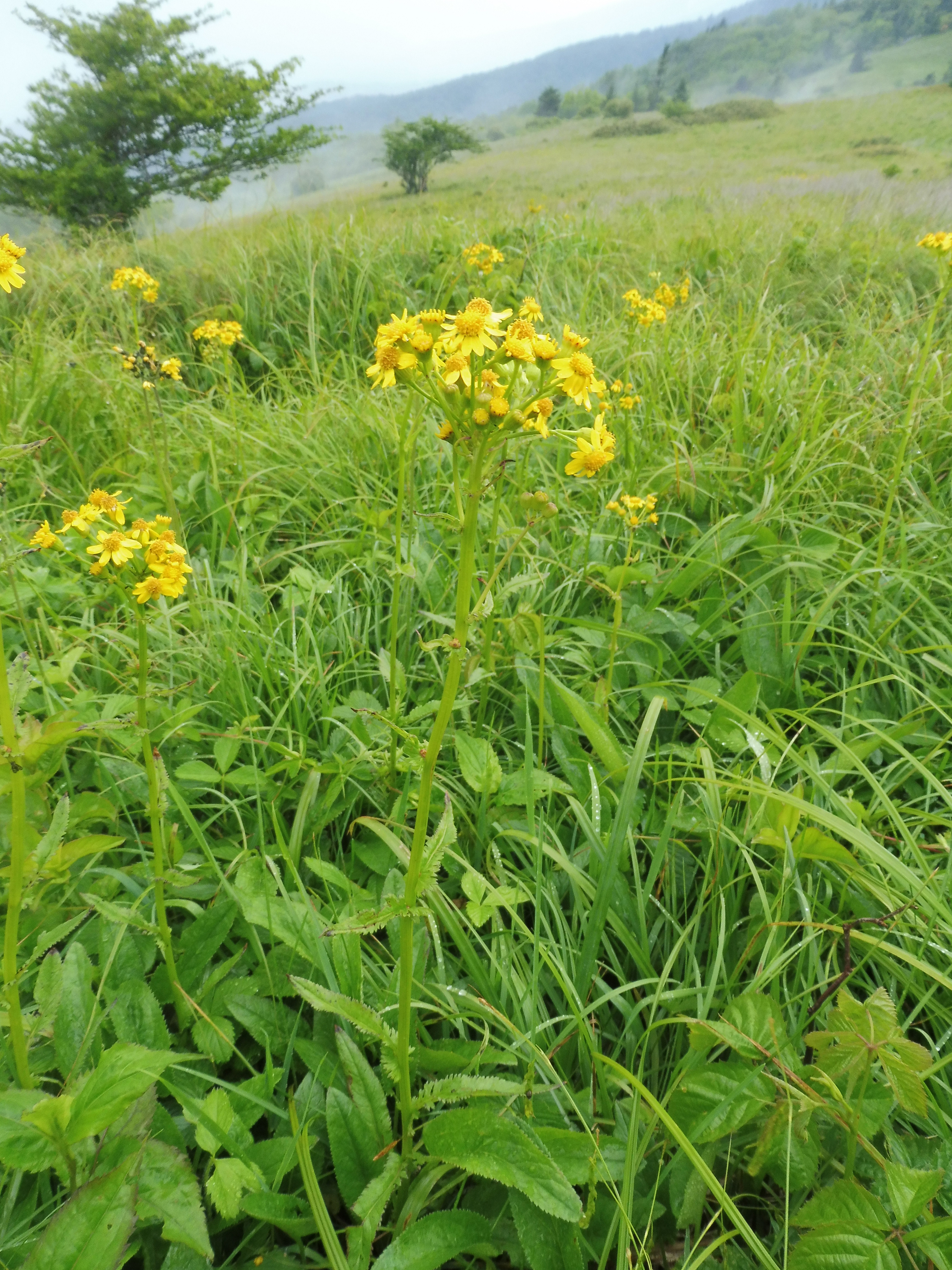

Scientific classification
- Kingdom: Plantae
- Clade: Tracheophytes
- Clade: Angiosperms
- Clade: Eudicots
- Clade: Asterids
- Order: Asterales
- Family: Asteraceae
- Genus: Packera
- Species: P. schweinitziana

Binomial name
- Packera schweinitziana (Nutt.) W.A.Weber & A. Löve

= Packera schweinitziana =

Species of flowering plant

Packera schweinitziana, commonly called New England groundsel, is a species of flowering plant in the aster family (Asteraceae). It is native to eastern North America, where it is primarily found in eastern Canada and the northeastern United States, with disjunct populations in North Carolina and Tennessee on Roan Mountain. Its natural habitat is in sunny, wet areas, often in acidic soil. In the southeastern United States, its habitat is restricted to Appalachian balds.

Packera schweinitziana is a perennial growing to around 70 cm tall, and is occasionally rhizomatous. It produces heads of yellow flowers from May to July. It can be distinguished from the similar-looking Packera aurea by its basal leaves, which are lanceolate to triangular and over 3x as long as wide.
