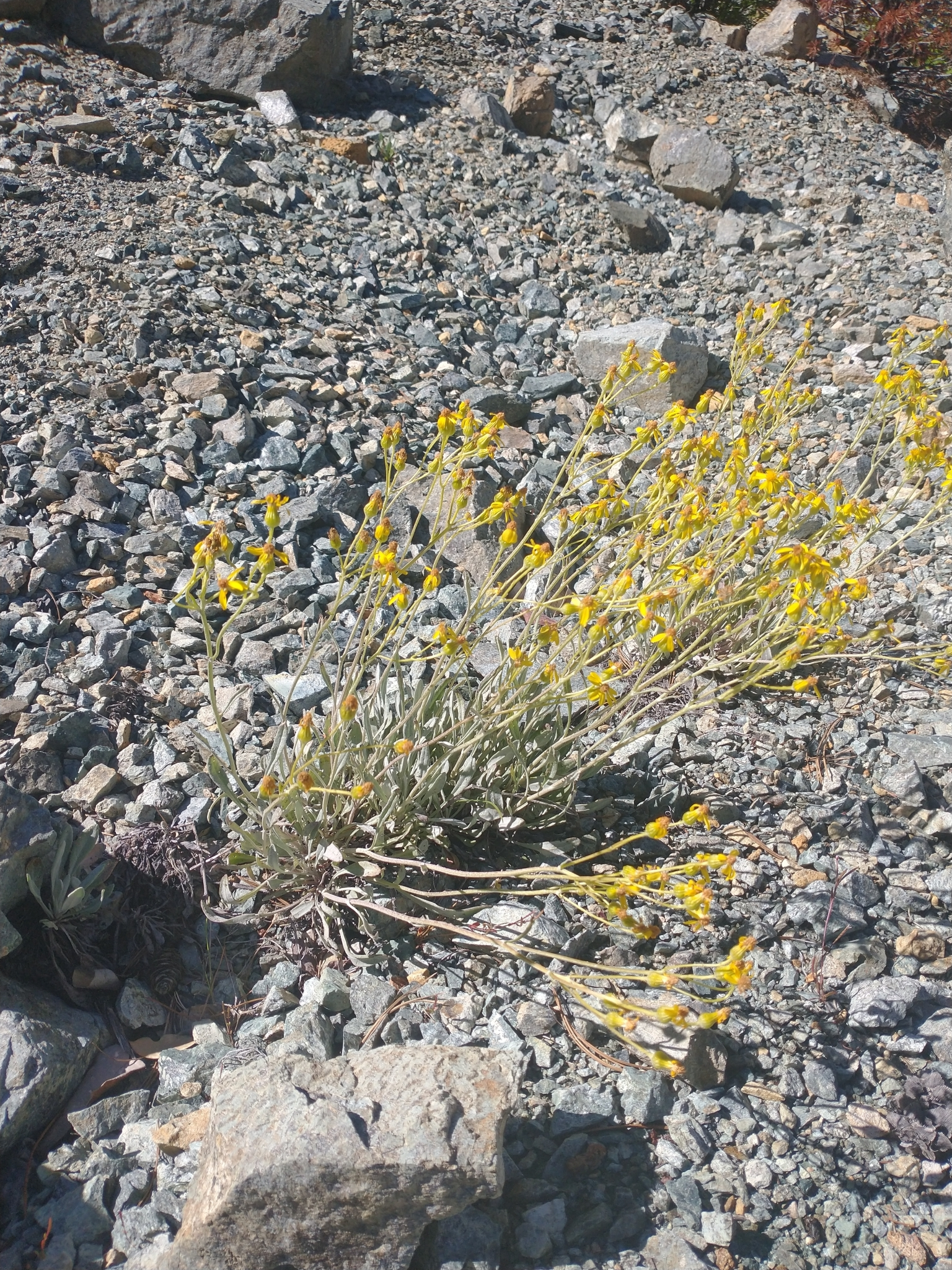

Scientific classification
- Kingdom: Plantae
- Clade: Tracheophytes
- Clade: Angiosperms
- Clade: Eudicots
- Clade: Asterids
- Order: Asterales
- Family: Asteraceae
- Genus: Packera
- Species: P. macounii

Binomial name
- Packera macounii (Greene) W.A.Weber & Á.Löve

Synonyms
- Senecio ligulifolius; S. macounii

= Packera macounii =

Species of flowering plant

Packera macounii is a species of flowering plant in the aster family known by the common name Siskiyou Mountains ragwort. It is native to the west coast of North America from British Columbia to far northern California, where it grows in chaparral and mountain forests, often on serpentine soils.

It is a perennial herb producing a single erect stem up to 40 or 50 centimeters in maximum height from a taproot and branching caudex unit. It is slightly hairy to quite woolly in texture. The leaves have lance-shaped blades several centimeters long which are borne on long petioles. The inflorescence holds several flower heads containing many disc florets and usually either 8 or 13 yellow ray florets each about a centimeter long.
