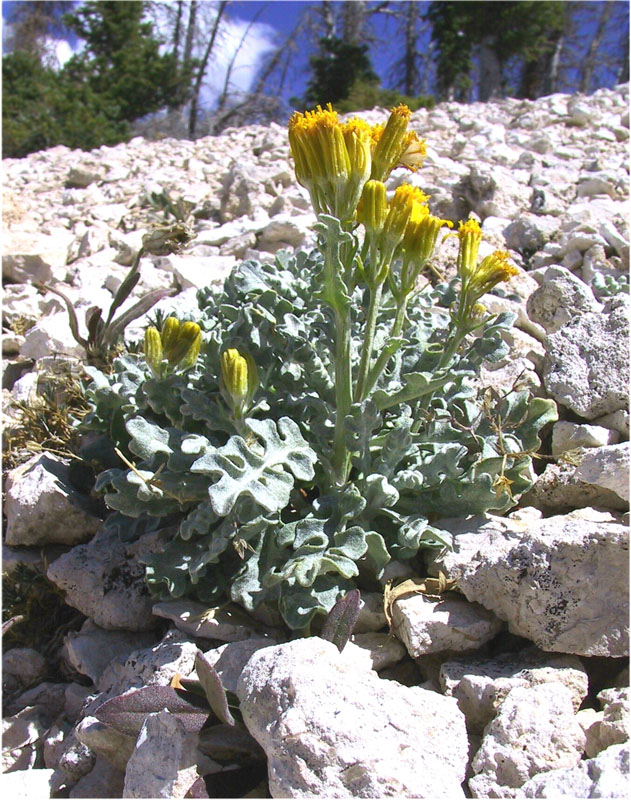

Conservation status
- Critically Imperiled (NatureServe)

Scientific classification
- Kingdom: Plantae
- Clade: Tracheophytes
- Clade: Angiosperms
- Clade: Eudicots
- Clade: Asterids
- Order: Asterales
- Family: Asteraceae
- Genus: Packera
- Species: P. musiniensis

Binomial name
- Packera musiniensis (S.L.Welsh) Trock

Synonyms
- Senecio musiniensis S.L. Welsh

= Packera musiniensis =

Species of flowering plant

Packera musiniensis is a rare species of flowering plant in the aster family known by the common names Musinea ragwort and Musinea groundsel. It is endemic to Utah in the United States, where it is known only from Sanpete County in the Manti-La Sal National Forest.

Packera musiniensis is a small perennial herb has a woolly-haired white stem 5–10 cm tall. Leaves are basal, lance-shaped basal leaves 2–3 cm long, with ruffled or nearly lobed edges. The inflorescence contains 3 to 15 flower heads on woolly peduncles. Each head is lined with yellow-green to purple phyllaries nearly a centimeter in length. There is no more than one ray floret; this may be absent. Blooming occurs in July and August.

Packera musiniensis occurs along the Wasatch Plateau and on Musinea Peak in central Utah. There are four reported populations, three of which are believed to be extant. It grows in subalpine and alpine habitats on limestone substrates at elevations over 3200 m (10,650 feet).
