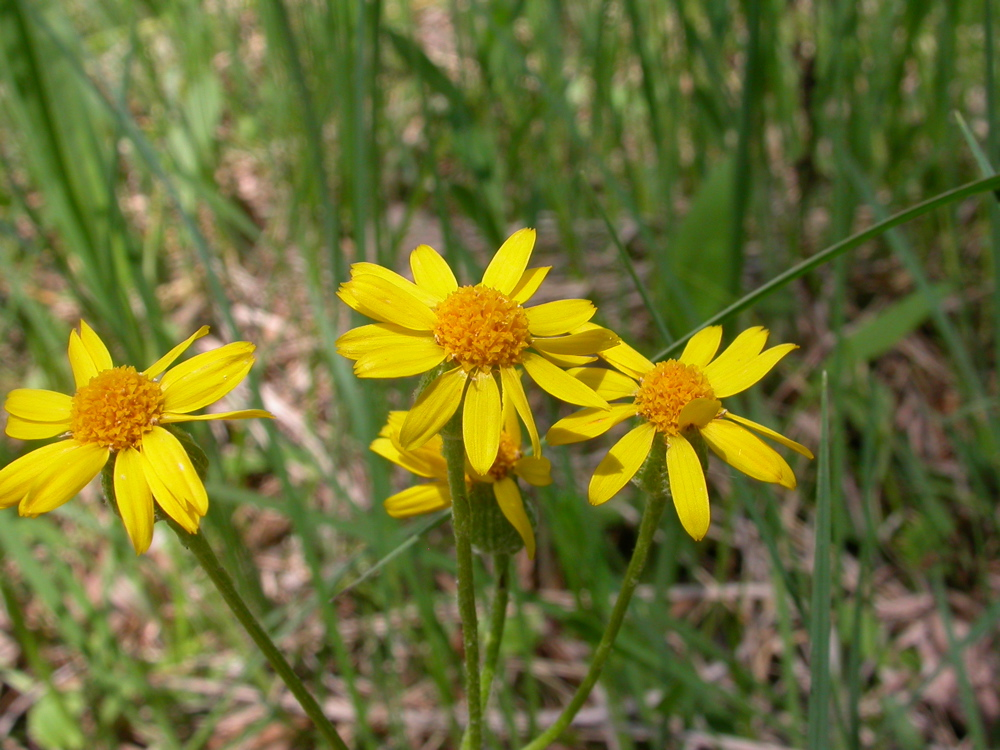

Conservation status
- Secure (NatureServe)

Scientific classification
- Kingdom: Plantae
- Clade: Tracheophytes
- Clade: Angiosperms
- Clade: Eudicots
- Clade: Asterids
- Order: Asterales
- Family: Asteraceae
- Genus: Packera
- Species: P. plattensis

Binomial name
- Packera plattensis (Nutt.) W.A.Weber & Á.Löve

Synonyms
- Senecio plattensis Nutt; Senecio pseudotomentosus Mackenzie & Bush

= Packera plattensis =

Prairie groundsel

Species of flowering plant

Packera plattensis, commonly known as prairie ragwort or prairie groundsel, is a species of the genus Packera and family Asteraceae. It used to be placed in the genus Senecio.

Prairie groundsel is found throughout the tallgrass prairie region. It blooms fairly early for a prairie wildflower: from April to July depending on the climate.

It is easily confused with golden ragwort (Packera aurea) which has a hairless stem and heart-shaped basal leaves, and Senecio integerrimus, which has leaves that are mostly entire instead of fern-like, and much larger basal leaves.
