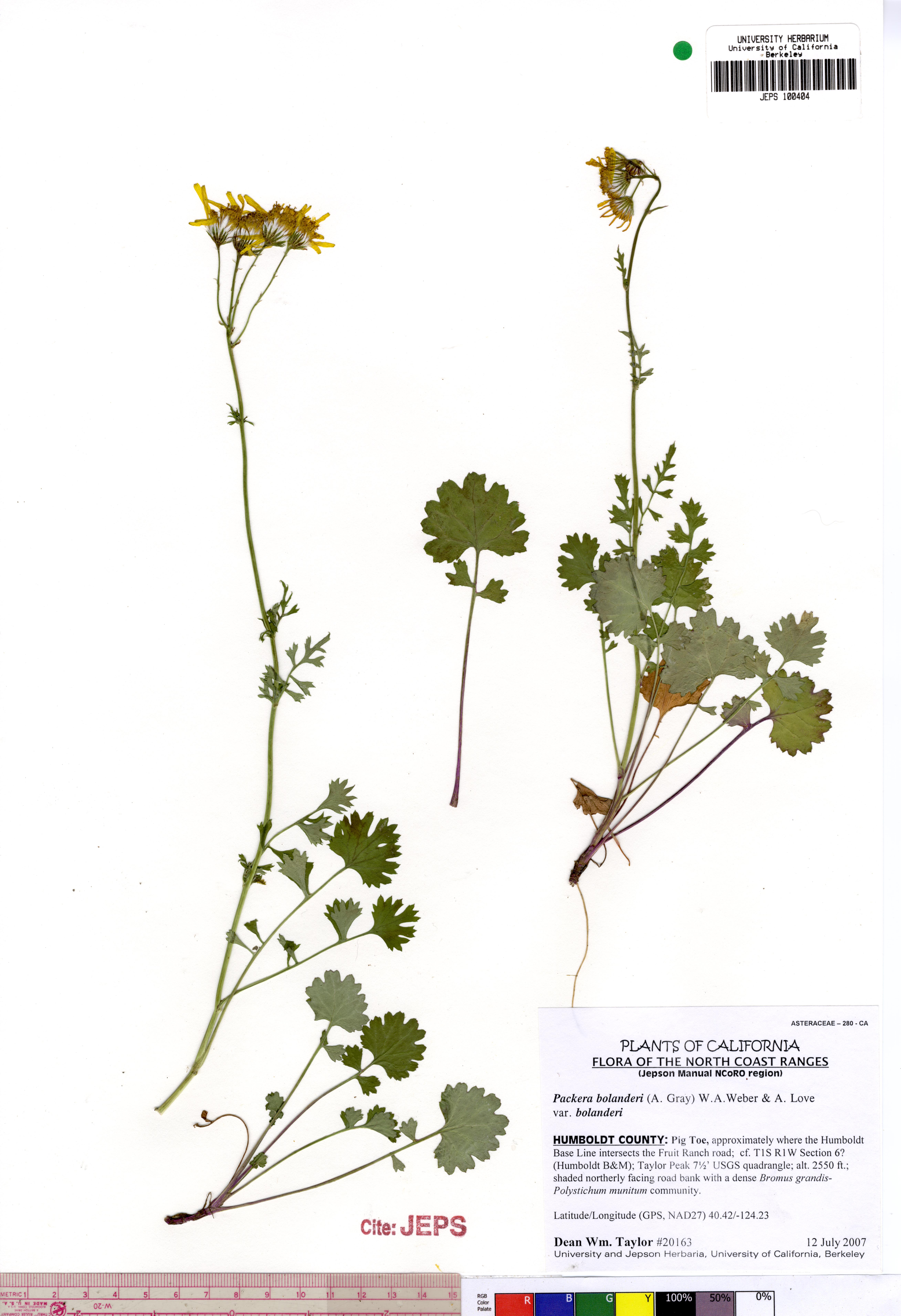
- var. bolanderi, herbarium specimen

Conservation status
- Apparently Secure (NatureServe)

Scientific classification
- Kingdom: Plantae
- Clade: Tracheophytes
- Clade: Angiosperms
- Clade: Eudicots
- Clade: Asterids
- Order: Asterales
- Family: Asteraceae
- Genus: Packera
- Species: P. bolanderi

Binomial name
- Packera bolanderi (A.Gray) W.A.Weber & Á.Löve

Synonyms
- Senecio bolanderi

= Packera bolanderi =

Species of flowering plant

Packera bolanderi is a species of flowering plant in the aster family known by the common names Bolander's ragwort and seacoast ragwort. It is native to the west coast of the United States from Washington to northern California, where it grows in wet coastal forests and woodlands. There are two varieties of the species which differ slightly in morphology and habitat occupied; these varieties have been considered separate species by some authors. The var. bolanderi has thicker leaves, occurs farther south (into California), and occupies more open types of habitat, than does var. harfordii. This plant in general is a perennial herb producing one to three stems up to half a meter tall. The basal leaves have blades up to 12 centimeters in length which are divided into several lobes and borne on long, thin petioles. Leaves growing higher up the stem are smaller and have more lobes on their blades. The inflorescence contains several flower heads, each lined with dark green phyllaries. The head contains many golden yellow disc florets and generally either 8 or 13 yellow ray florets each over a centimeter long. The fruit is an achene tipped with a pappus of bristles.
