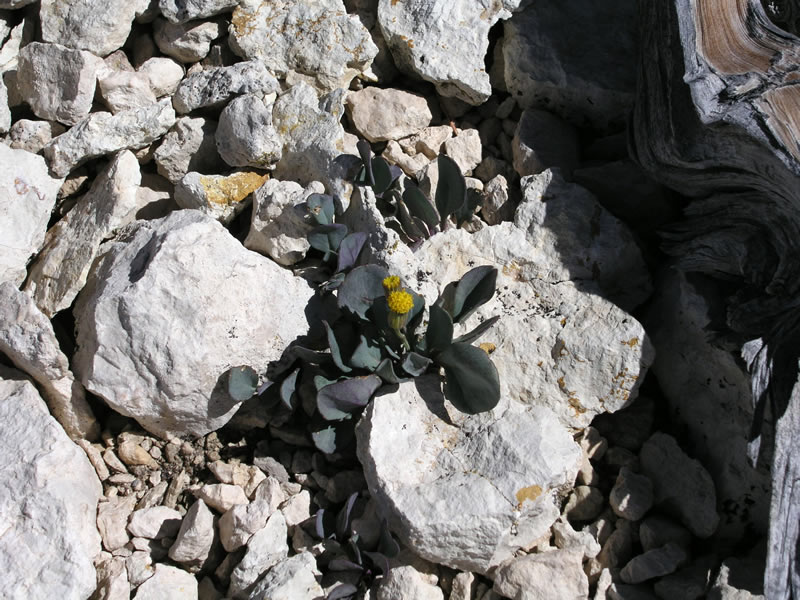

Conservation status
- Critically Imperiled (NatureServe)

Scientific classification
- Kingdom: Plantae
- Clade: Tracheophytes
- Clade: Angiosperms
- Clade: Eudicots
- Clade: Asterids
- Order: Asterales
- Family: Asteraceae
- Genus: Packera
- Species: P. malmstenii

Binomial name
- Packera malmstenii (S.F.Blake ex Tidestr.) Kartesz

Synonyms
- Senecio malmstenii

= Packera malmstenii =

Species of flowering plant

Packera malmstenii is a rare species of flowering plant in the aster family known by the common name Podunk ragwort. It is endemic to Utah in the United States, where there about 19 occurrences in the southwestern part of the state.

This perennial herb is generally about 8 to 15 centimeters tall, growing from a branching rhizome. It produces one stem or a small cluster of stems and leaves with oval blades up to 2.5 centimeters long. There is one or more flower heads, each with 13 blue-green phyllaries about a centimeter in length. The head may contain ray florets, or these may be absent. Blooming occurs in July and August.

This plant occurs on the limestone of the Claron Formation in Utah. It can be found on the Markagunt, Aquarius, and Paunsaugunt Plateaus. It occurs within the bounds of the Dixie National Forest and Cedar Breaks National Monument. There are few threats to its survival because it occurs in inaccessible, rugged habitat and on soils high in calcium carbonate, which are inhospitable to weeds.
