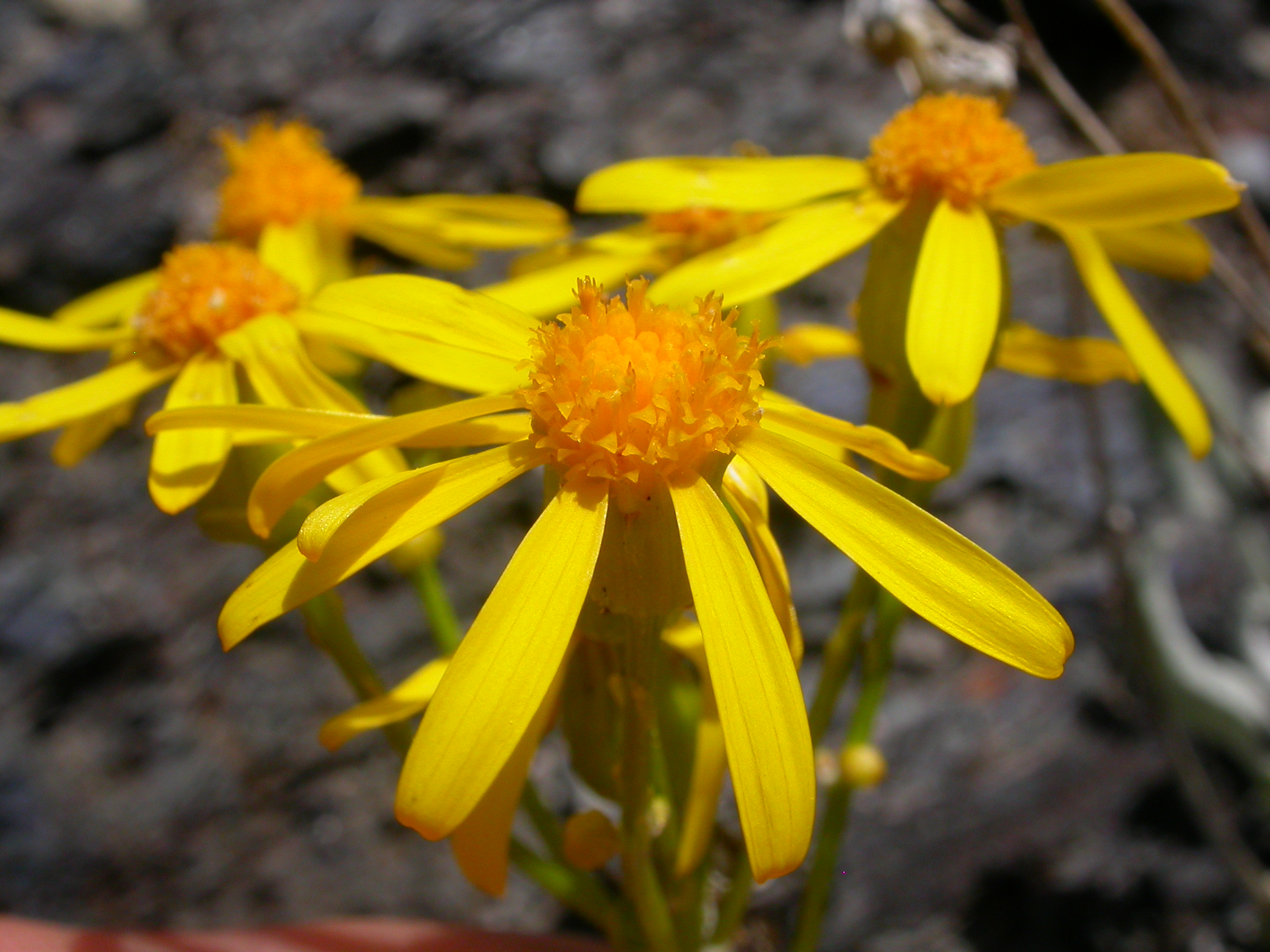

Conservation status
- Secure (NatureServe)

Scientific classification
- Kingdom: Plantae
- Clade: Tracheophytes
- Clade: Angiosperms
- Clade: Eudicots
- Clade: Asterids
- Order: Asterales
- Family: Asteraceae
- Genus: Packera
- Species: P. cana

Binomial name
- Packera cana (Hook.) W.A.Weber & Á.Löve

Synonyms
- Senecio canus

= Packera cana =

Species of flowering plant

Packera cana (syn. Senecio canus) is a species of flowering plant in the aster family known by the common name woolly groundsel. It is native to western and central North America. It is often found growing in sagebrush scrub habitats, open forests, meadows, and rocky areas.
