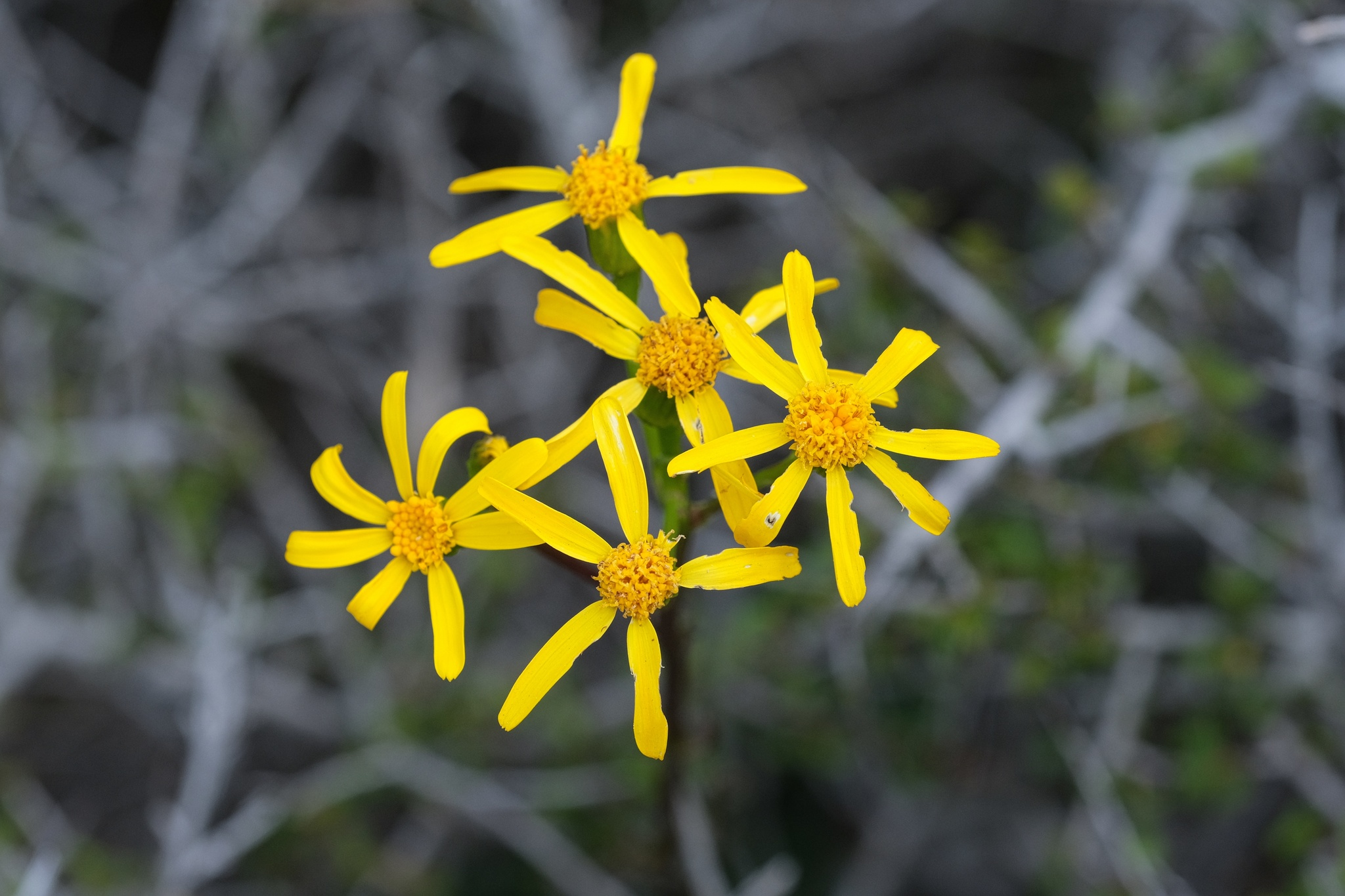

Conservation status
- Imperiled (NatureServe)

Scientific classification
- Kingdom: Plantae
- Clade: Tracheophytes
- Clade: Angiosperms
- Clade: Eudicots
- Clade: Asterids
- Order: Asterales
- Family: Asteraceae
- Genus: Packera
- Species: P. ganderi

Binomial name
- Packera ganderi (T.M.Barkley & R.M.Beauch.) W.A.Weber & A.Löve

Synonyms
- Senecio ganderi

= Packera ganderi =

Species of flowering plant

Packera ganderi is a rare species of flowering plant in the aster family known by the common name Gander's ragwort. It is endemic to southern California, where it is known from a few occurrences in San Diego and Riverside Counties.

There are an estimated 4,000 plants in existence, but this number varies year to year because the plant becomes more abundant after its habitat burns in wildfires.

It is a native of the fire-prone California chaparral plant community, where it grows in gabbro rock outcrops.

== Description ==
Packera ganderi is a perennial herb producing a single upright stem which grows to a maximum height of 50 to 80 centimeters. It is mostly hairy and green, but may have some fuzzy areas and a purple tinge. The leaves have rounded or oval blades with toothed edges or shallow lobes. The blades are often thick and somewhat tough, measuring a few centimeters long and borne on petioles longer than themselves. Leaves occurring higher up the stem are smaller and most lack petioles.

The inflorescence contains up to 6 or 8 flower heads, each lined with green-tipped, yellow-edged phyllaries. The head contains many golden yellow disc florets and several orange ray florets each about a centimeter long.

== See also ==
- California chaparral and woodlands
