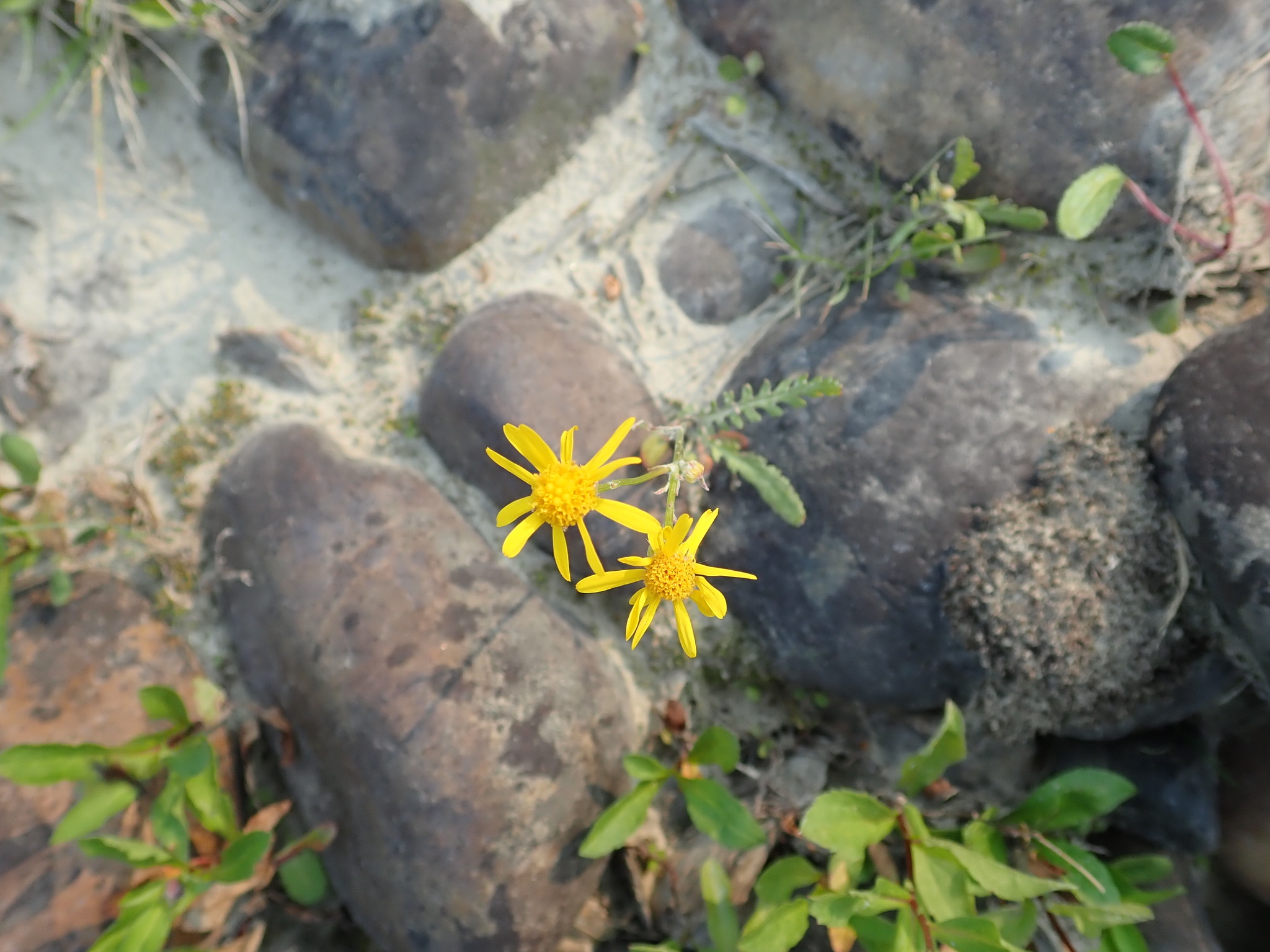

Scientific classification
- Kingdom: Plantae
- Clade: Tracheophytes
- Clade: Angiosperms
- Clade: Eudicots
- Clade: Asterids
- Order: Asterales
- Family: Asteraceae
- Genus: Packera
- Species: P. indecora

Binomial name
- Packera indecora (Greene) Á.Löve & D.Löve

Synonyms
- Senecio indecorus

= Packera indecora =

Species of flowering plant

Packera indecora is a species of flowering plant in the aster family known by the common names elegant groundsel and rayless mountain ragwort. It is native to northern North America including most of Canada and sections of the northernmost United States. It grows in moist mountain habitats, such as streamsides and meadows.

It is a perennial herb producing a single stem or a cluster of 2 or 3 stems from a branching caudex and a taproot. The plant reaches heights of ten centimeters to one meter. The leaves have thin, oblong or oval blades a few centimeters long borne on long petioles. Smaller, more intricately divided leaves may occur higher up the stem.

The inflorescence is an umbel-shaped array of up to 20 or more flower heads, each lined with green- or red-tipped phyllaries. The head contains many disc florets and occasionally a tiny yellow ray floret, though these are usually absent.
