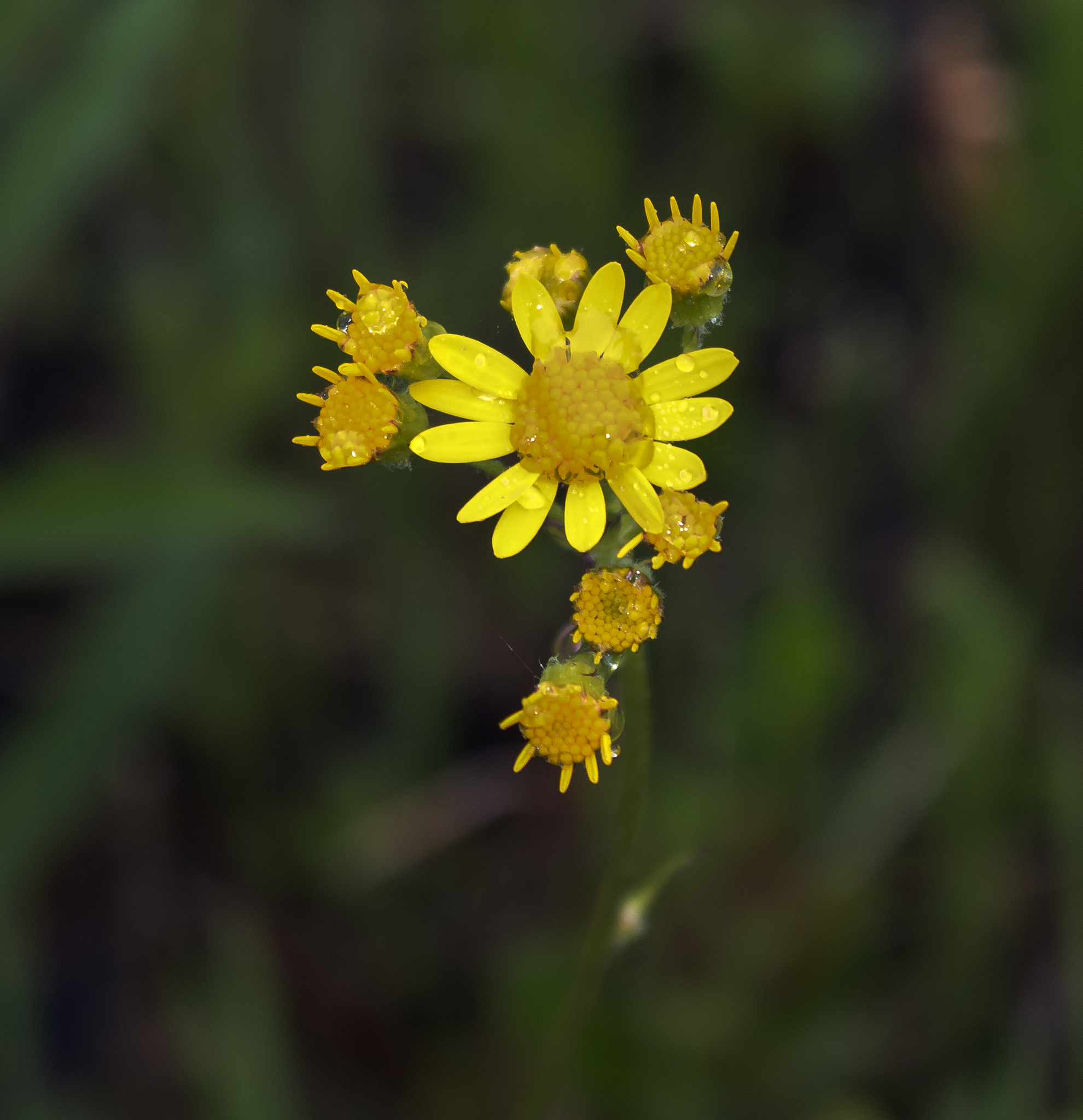

Conservation status
- Secure (NatureServe)

Scientific classification
- Kingdom: Plantae
- Clade: Tracheophytes
- Clade: Angiosperms
- Clade: Eudicots
- Clade: Asterids
- Order: Asterales
- Family: Asteraceae
- Genus: Packera
- Species: P. pseudaurea

Binomial name
- Packera pseudaurea (Rydb.) W.A.Weber & Á.Löve

Synonyms
- Senecio pseudaureus

= Packera pseudaurea =

Species of flowering plant

Packera pseudaurea is a species of flowering plant in the aster family known by the common name falsegold groundsel. It is native to North America, where it can be found in western and central parts of Canada and the United States. It grows in mountain habitat such as meadows, streambanks, and woodlands.

It is a perennial herb producing usually one erect stem, sometimes a cluster of a few stems, up to about 70 centimeters in maximum height. The basal leaves have rounded, oval, or widely lance-shaped blades up to 10 centimeters long which are borne on very long petioles. Leaves higher on the stem have no petioles, their bases clasping the stem. They are narrow and pointed with serrated edges. The inflorescence bears several flower heads in a loose or dense, flat-topped array. Each head is full of yellow disc florets and most heads have several yellow ray florets, though some heads lack them.

There are three varieties of this species: var. flavula occupies a long strip of mountains from Idaho to New Mexico, var. semicordata is mainly limited to the upper Midwest region, and var. pseudaurea is distributed throughout the western part of the species' range.
