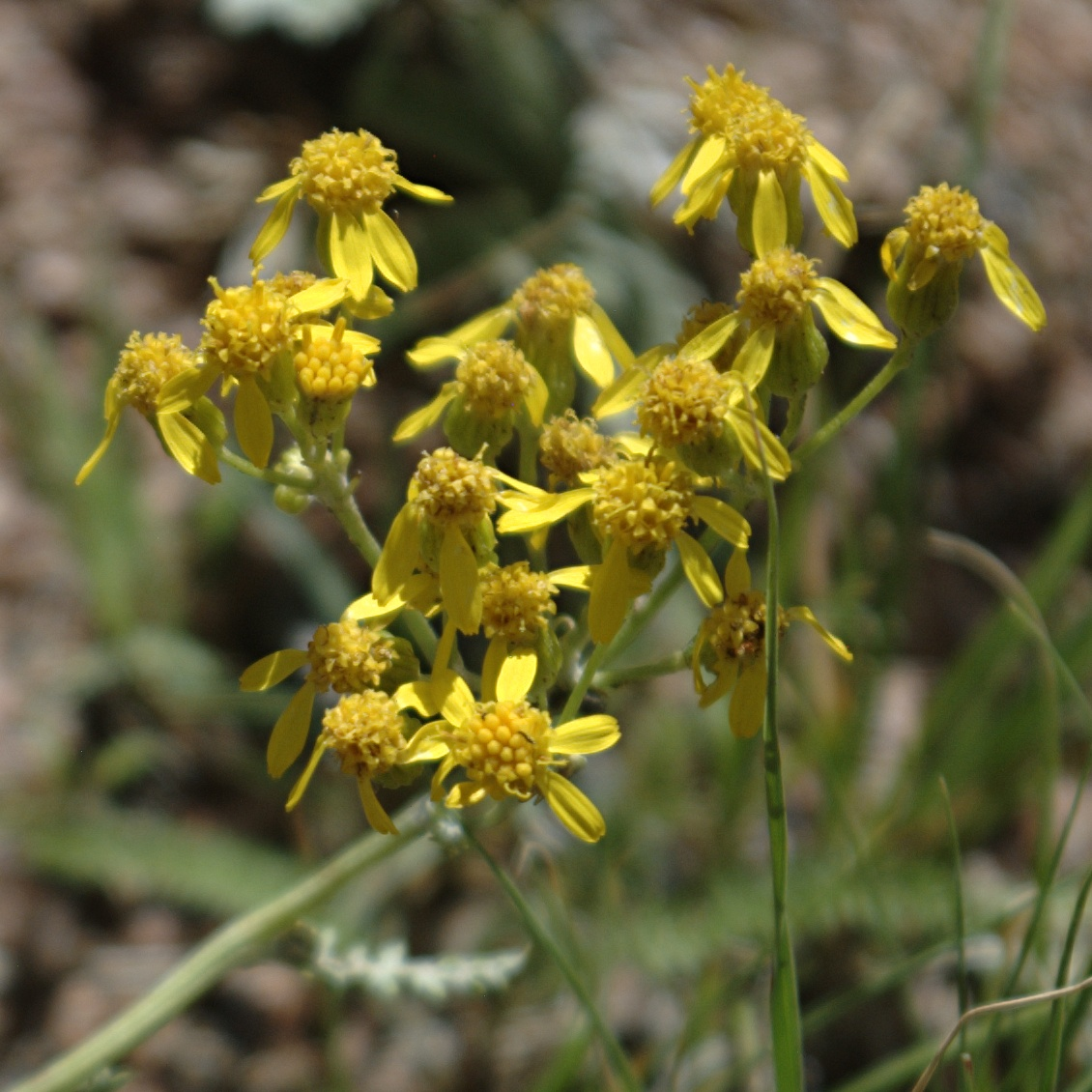

Conservation status
- Apparently Secure (NatureServe)

Scientific classification
- Kingdom: Plantae
- Clade: Tracheophytes
- Clade: Angiosperms
- Clade: Eudicots
- Clade: Asterids
- Order: Asterales
- Family: Asteraceae
- Genus: Packera
- Species: P. fendleri

Binomial name
- Packera fendleri (A. Gray) W.A.Weber & Á.Löve

Synonyms
- Senecio fendleri

= Packera fendleri =

Species of flowering plant

Packera fendleri is a species of flowering plant in the family Asteraceae known by the common name Fendler's ragwort. It is native to the southern Rocky Mountains, and is found in the states of Colorado, Wyoming and New Mexico, where it is a common plant that occurs in a variety of habitats. It is a perennial herb, reaching a maximum height of around 16 inches tall. It flowers between late May and early October, producing an inflorescence of 6–25 flower heads, each lined with 13 green phyllaries, and containing many disk florets and 6–8+ yellow ray florets.
