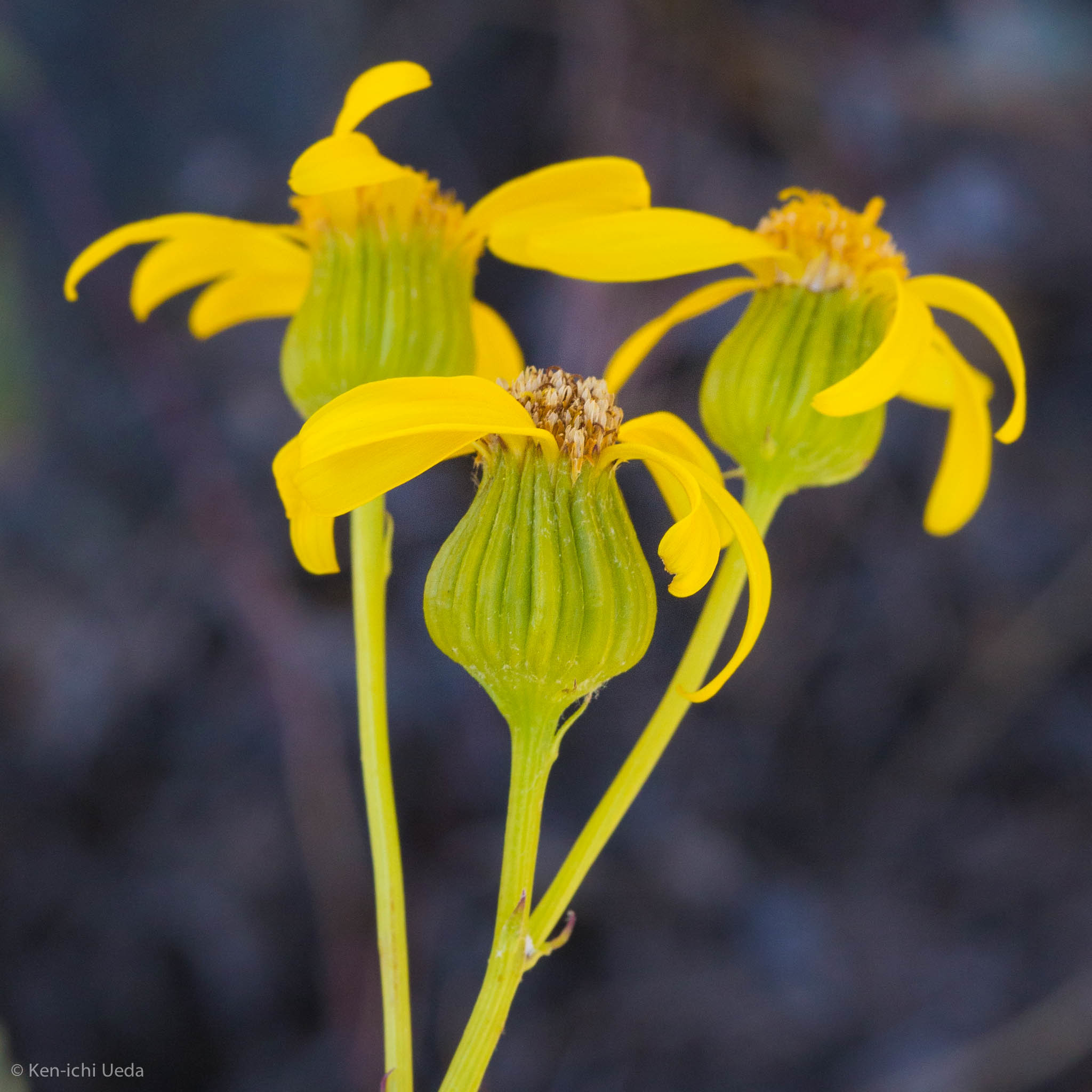

Scientific classification
- Kingdom: Plantae
- Clade: Tracheophytes
- Clade: Angiosperms
- Clade: Eudicots
- Clade: Asterids
- Order: Asterales
- Family: Asteraceae
- Genus: Packera
- Species: P. eurycephala

Binomial name
- Packera eurycephala (Torr. & A.Gray) W.A.Weber & Á.Löve

Synonyms
- Senecio austinae Senecio eurycephalus Senecio lewisrosei

= Packera eurycephala =

Species of flowering plant

Packera eurycephala is a species of flowering plant in the aster family known by the common name widehead groundsel. It is native to a section of the western United States encompassing southern Oregon, northern California, and northern Nevada. It can be found in dry habitat types, often in disturbed areas, and it favors serpentine soils.

It is a perennial herb reaching a maximum height of 50 to 70 centimeters, its cluster of erect stems growing from a taproot and woody caudex unit. The leaves are up to 10 centimeters long and are made up of many narrow, lacy lobes. The plant is slightly to densely woolly in texture.

The inflorescence contains several flower heads, each lined with green- or yellow-tipped phyllaries. The head contains many golden yellow disc florets and generally either 8 or 13 yellow ray florets each just over a centimeter long.
