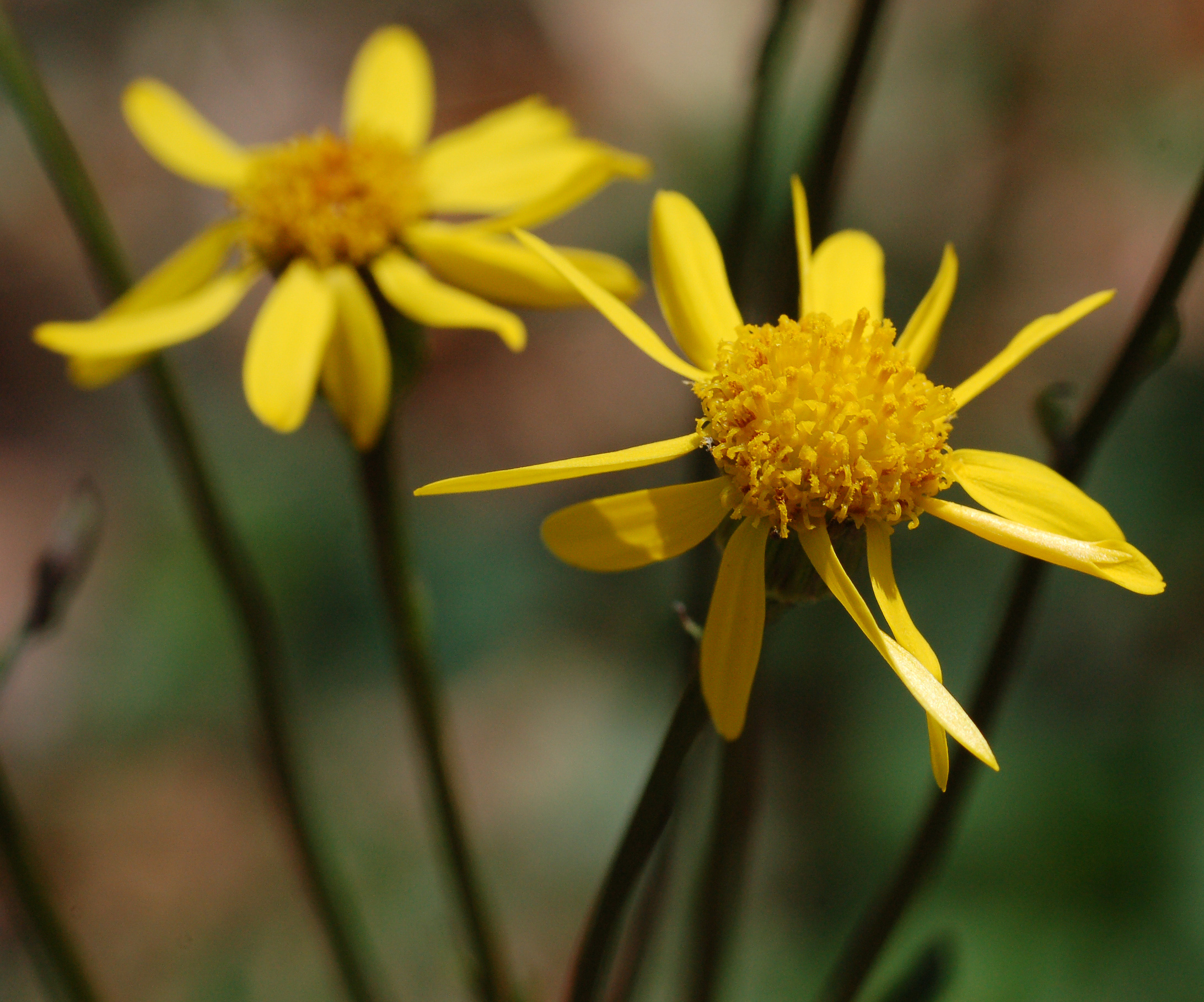
- Packera aurea

Scientific classification
- Kingdom: Plantae
- Clade: Embryophytes
- Clade: Tracheophytes
- Clade: Angiosperms
- Clade: Eudicots
- Clade: Asterids
- Order: Asterales
- Family: Asteraceae
- Subfamily: Asteroideae
- Tribe: Senecioneae
- Genus: Packera; Á. Löve & D. Löve

Type species
- Packera aurea (L.) Á. Löve & D. Löve

= Packera =

Genus of flowering plants

Packera is a genus of about 75 species of plants in the daisy family, Asteraceae. Most species are commonly called ragworts or grounsels. Its members were previously included in the genus Senecio (where they were called aureoid senecios by Asa Gray) but were moved to genus Packera based on chromosome numbers, a variety of morphological characters, and molecular phylogenetic evidence.

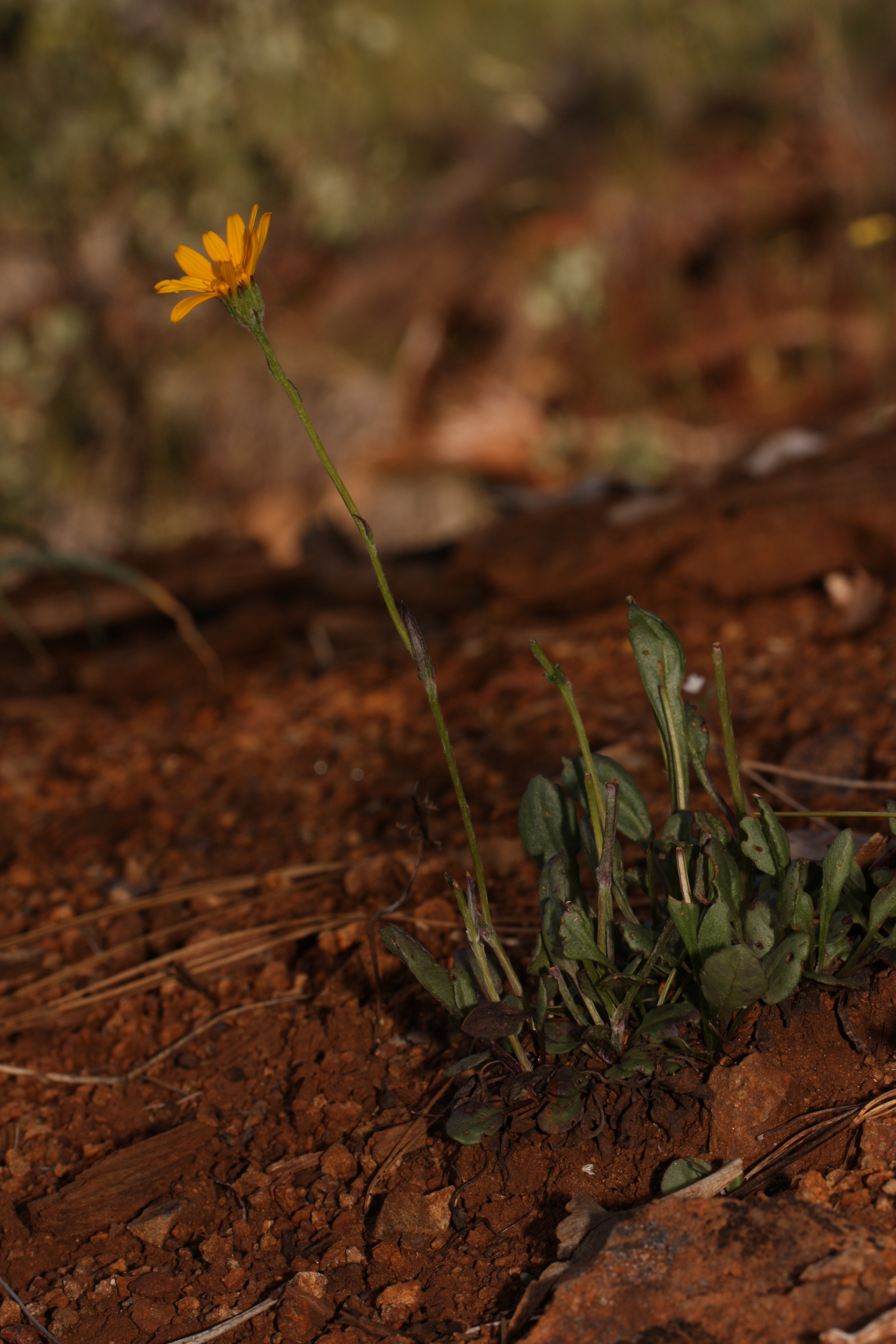
Packera hesperia

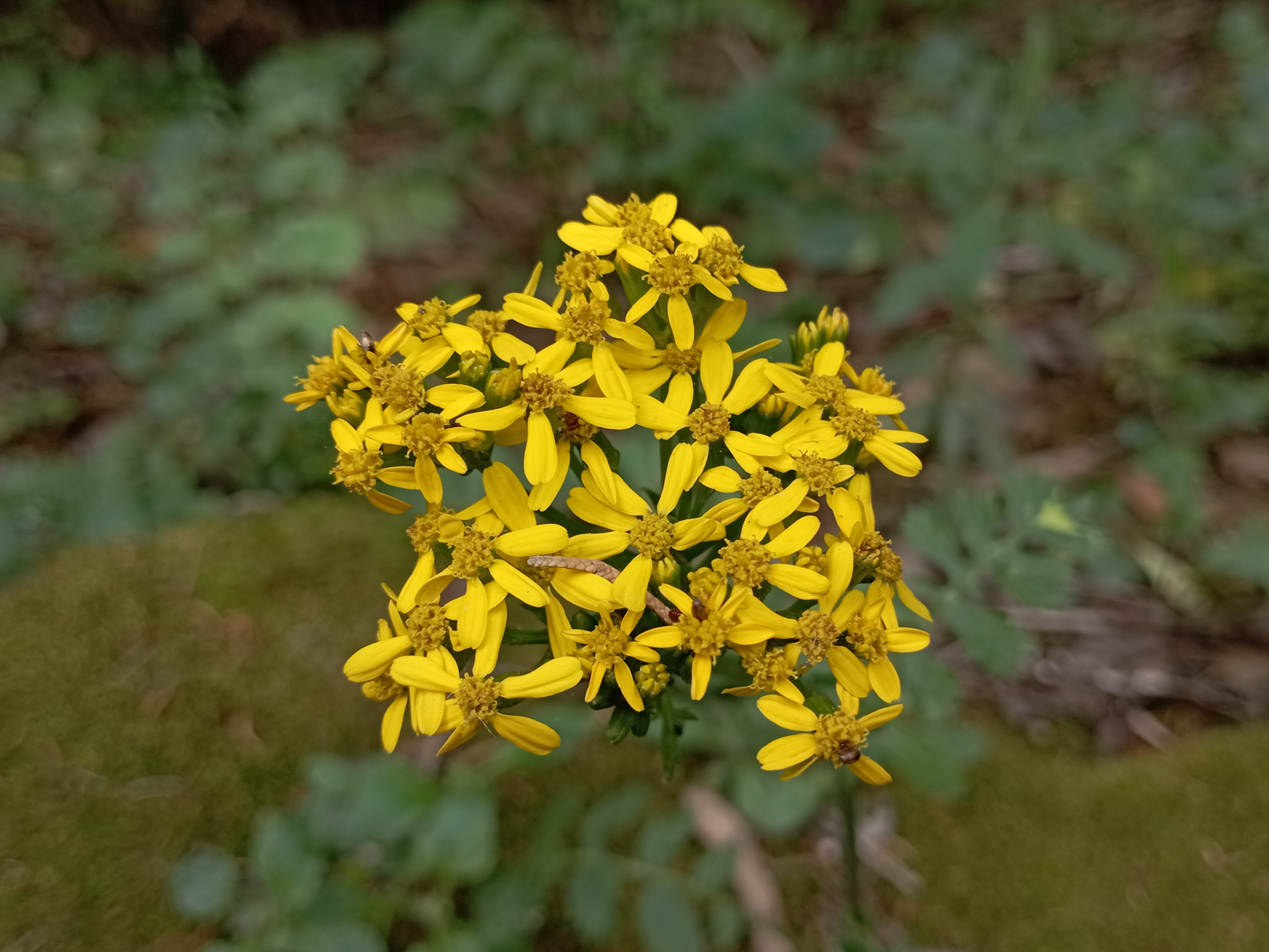
Packera sanguisorbae

== Species ==
As of March 2023, Plants of the World Online accepted the following species. English names are based on the PLANTS database.

- Packera actinella (Greene) W.A.Weber & Á.Löve – flagstaff ragwort
- Packera anonyma (Alph.Wood) W.A.Weber & A.Löve − Small's ragwort
- Packera antennariifolia (Britton) W.A.Weber & A.Löve − shalebarren ragwort
- Packera aurea (L.) Á.Löve & D.Löve (syn. Senecio aureus) − golden ragwort
- Packera bellidifolia (Kunth) W.A.Weber & Á.Löve
- Packera bernardina (Greene) W.A.Weber & A.Löve − San Bernardino ragwort
- Packera bolanderi (Gray) W.A.Weber & A.Löve − Bolander's ragwort
- Packera breweri (Burtt Davy) W.A.Weber & A.Löve (syn. Senecio breweri) − Brewer's ragwort
- Packera cana (Hook.) W.A.Weber & A.Löve − woolly groundsel
- Packera candidissima (Greene) W.A.Weber & Á.Löve
- Packera cardamine (Greene) W.A.Weber & A.Löve − bittercress ragwort
- Packera castoreus (S.L.Welsh) Kartesz − Beaver Mountain ragwort
- Packera clevelandii (Greene) W.A.Weber & A.Löve (syn. Senecio clevelandii) − Cleveland's ragwort
- Packera coahuilensis (Greenm.) C.Jeffrey
- Packera contermina (Greenm.) J.F.Bain
- Packera crawfordii (Britton) A.M.Mahoney & R.R.Kowal
- Packera crocata (Rydb.) W.A.Weber & A.Löve − saffron ragwort
- Packera cymbalaria (Pursh) W.A.Weber & A.Löve − dwarf arctic ragwort
- Packera cynthioides (Greene) W.A.Weber & A.Löve (syn. Senecio cynthiodes) − White Mountain ragwort
- Packera debilis (Nutt.) W.A.Weber & A.Löve − weak groundsel
- Packera dimorphophylla (Greene) W.A.Weber & A.Löve − splitleaf groundsel
- Packera dubia (Spreng.) Trock & Mabb. (syn. Packera tomentosa) − woolly ragwort
- Packera eurycephala (Torr. & A.Gray) W.A.Weber & A.Löve − widehead groundsel
- Packera fendleri (Gray) W.A.Weber & A.Löve − Fendler's ragwort
- Packera flettii (Wiegand) W.A.Weber & A.Löve − Flett's ragwort
- Packera franciscana (Greene) W.A.Weber & A.Löve (syn. Senecio franciscanus) − San Francisco Peaks ragwort
- Packera ganderi (T.M.Barkley & R.M.Beauch.) W.A.Weber & Á.Löve − Gander's ragwort
- Packera glabella (Poir) C.Jeffrey (syn. Senecio glabellus) − butterweed
- Packera greenei (Gray) W.A.Weber & A.Löve − flame ragwort
- Packera hartiana (Heller) W.A.Weber & A.Löve − Hart's ragwort
- Packera hesperia (Greene) W.A.Weber & A.Löve − western ragwort
- Packera heterophylla (Fisch.) E.Wiebe
- Packera hintoniorum (B.L.Turner) C.Jeffrey
- Packera hyperborealis (Greenm.) Á.Löve & D.Löve − northern groundsel
- Packera indecora (Greene) Á.Löve & D.Löve − elegant groundsel
- Packera insulae-regalis R.R.Kowal − Isle Royale ragwort
- Packera ionophylla (Greene) W.A.Weber & A.Löve − Tehachapi ragwort
- Packera layneae (Greene) W.A.Weber & A.Löve − Layne's ragwort
- Packera loratifolia (Greenm.) W.A.Weber & Á.Löve
- Packera macounii (Greene) W.A.Weber & A.Löve − Siskiyou Mountain ragwort
- Packera malmstenii (S.F.Blake ex Tidestr.) Kartesz − Podunk ragwort
- Packera mancosiana Yeatts, B.Schneid. & Al Schneid.
- Packera × memmingeri (Britton ex Small) Weakley
- Packera millefolium (Torr. & A.Gray) W.A.Weber & Á.Löve (syn. Senecio millefolium) − piedmont ragwort
- Packera millelobata (Rydb.) W.A.Weber & A.Löve − Uinta ragwort
- Packera montereyana (S.Watson) C.Jeffrey
- Packera moranii (T.M.Barkley) C.Jeffrey
- Packera multilobata (Torr. & A.Gray) W.A.Weber & Á.Löve − lobeleaf groundsel
- Packera musiniensis (S.L.Welsh) Trock
- Packera neomexicana (A.Gray) W.A.Weber & A.Löve − New Mexico groundsel
- Packera obovata (Willd.) W.A.Weber & A.Löve (syn. Senecio obovatus) − roundleaf ragwort
- Packera ogotorukensis (Packer) Á.Löve & D.Löve − Ogotoruk Creek ragwort
- Packera pauciflora (Pursh) Á.Löve & D.Löve − alpine groundsel
- Packera paupercula (Michx.) Á.Löve & D.Löve − balsam groundsel
- Packera plattensis (Nutt.) W.A.Weber & A.Löve (syn. Senecio plattensis) − prairie groundsel
- Packera porteri (Greene) C.Jeffrey − Porter's groundsel
- Packera pseudaurea (Rydb.) W.A.Weber & A.Löve − falsegold groundsel
- Packera quebradensis (Greenm.) W.A.Weber & Á.Löve
- Packera quercetorum (Greene) C.Jeffrey − Oak Creek ragwort
- Packera rosei (Greenm.) W.A.Weber & Á.Löve
- Packera sanguisorbae (DC.) C.Jeffrey
- Packera sanguisorboides (Rydb.) W.A.Weber & A.Löve − burnet ragwort
- Packera scalaris (Greene) C.Jeffrey
- Packera schweinitziana (Nutt.) W.A.Weber & A.Löve (syn. Senecio schweinitzianus) − Schweinitz's ragwort
- Packera serpenticola Boufford, Kartesz, S.H.Shi & R.Zhou − serpentine ragwort
- Packera spellenbergii (T.M.Barkley) C.Jeffrey − Carrizo Creek ragwort
- Packera streptanthifolia (Greene) W.A.Weber & A.Löve − Rocky Mountain groundsel
- Packera subnuda (DC.) Trock & T.M.Barkley – Buek's groundsel
- Packera tampicana (DC.) C.Jeffrey − Great Plains ragwort
- Packera texensis O'Kennon & Trock
- Packera thurberi (A.Gray) B.L.Turner
- Packera toluccana (DC.) W.A.Weber & Á.Löve
- Packera umbraculifera (S.Watson) W.A.Weber & Á.Löve
- Packera werneriifolia (A.Gray) W.A.Weber & A.Löve − hoary groundsel
- Packera zimapanica (Hemsl.) C.C.Freeman & T.M.Barkley
