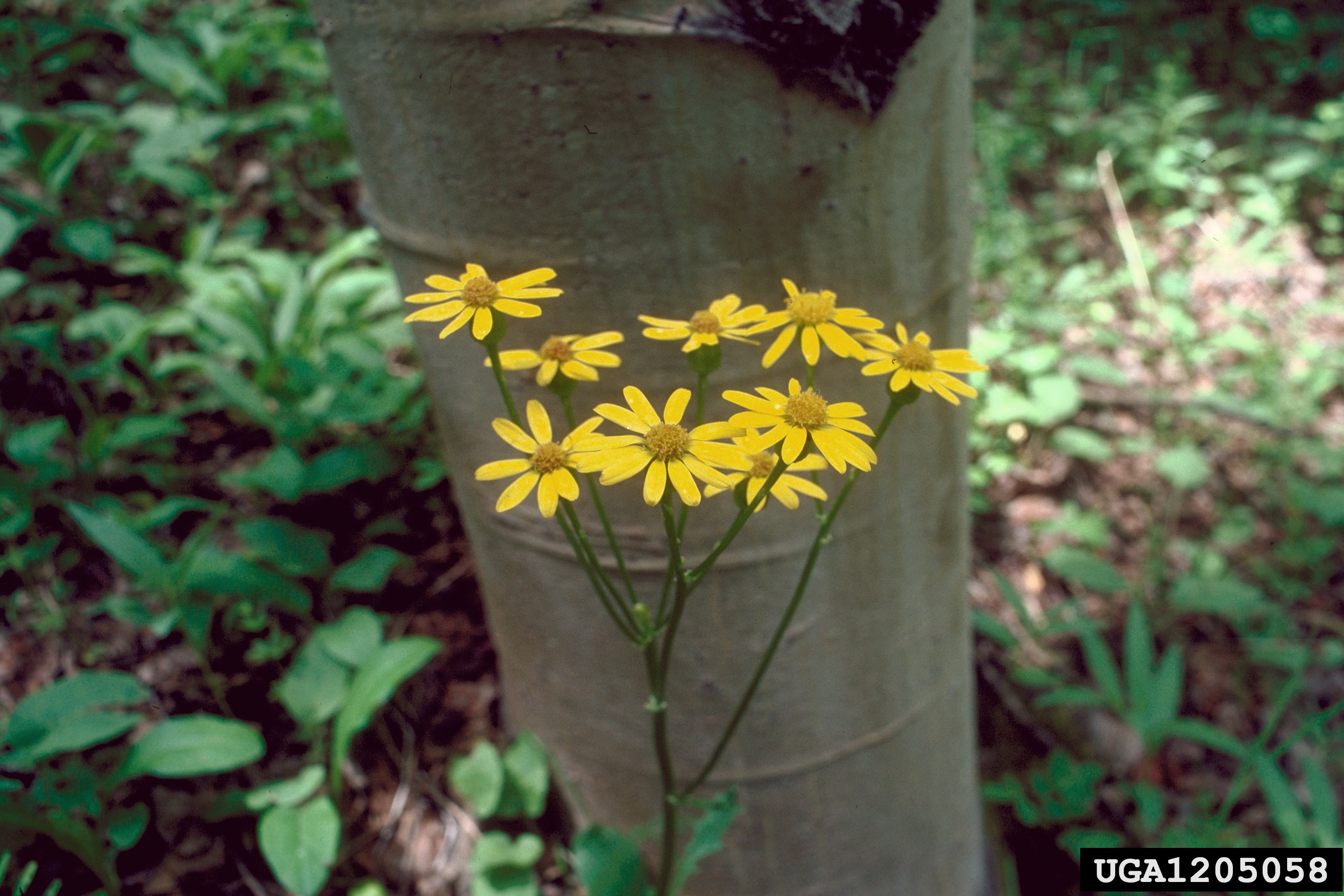

Conservation status
- Secure (NatureServe)

Scientific classification
- Kingdom: Plantae
- Clade: Tracheophytes
- Clade: Angiosperms
- Clade: Eudicots
- Clade: Asterids
- Order: Asterales
- Family: Asteraceae
- Genus: Packera
- Species: P. streptanthifolia

Binomial name
- Packera streptanthifolia (Greene) W.A.Weber & Á.Löve

Synonyms
- Packera cymbalarioides; P. oodes; Senecio acutidens; S. adamsii; S. cymbalarioides; S. fulgens; S. jonesii; S. laetiflorus; S. leonardii; S. longipetiolatus; S. oodes; S. pammelii; S. platylobus; S. rubricaulis; S. streptanthifolius; S. subcuneatus

= Packera streptanthifolia =

Species of flowering plant

Packera streptanthifolia is a species of flowering plant in the aster family known by the common name Rocky Mountain groundsel. It is native to western North America from Alaska to California to New Mexico, where it can be found in mountain habitat including woodlands and rocky slopes.

It is a perennial herb producing usually one erect stem, sometimes a cluster of a few stems, 10 to 60 centimeters in maximum height. The spatula-shaped basal leaves have oval or lance-shaped blades on long petioles. They are thick, firm, and sometimes somewhat succulent. Leaves higher on the stem are smaller, thinner, and simpler, and may lack petioles.

The inflorescence is a loose array of two or more flower heads with yellow disc florets and usually either 8 or 13 yellow ray florets up to a centimeter long each.

It is named for having foliage similar to certain Streptanthus species, usual with a somewhat succulent oval leaf and rounded teeth at the tip.
