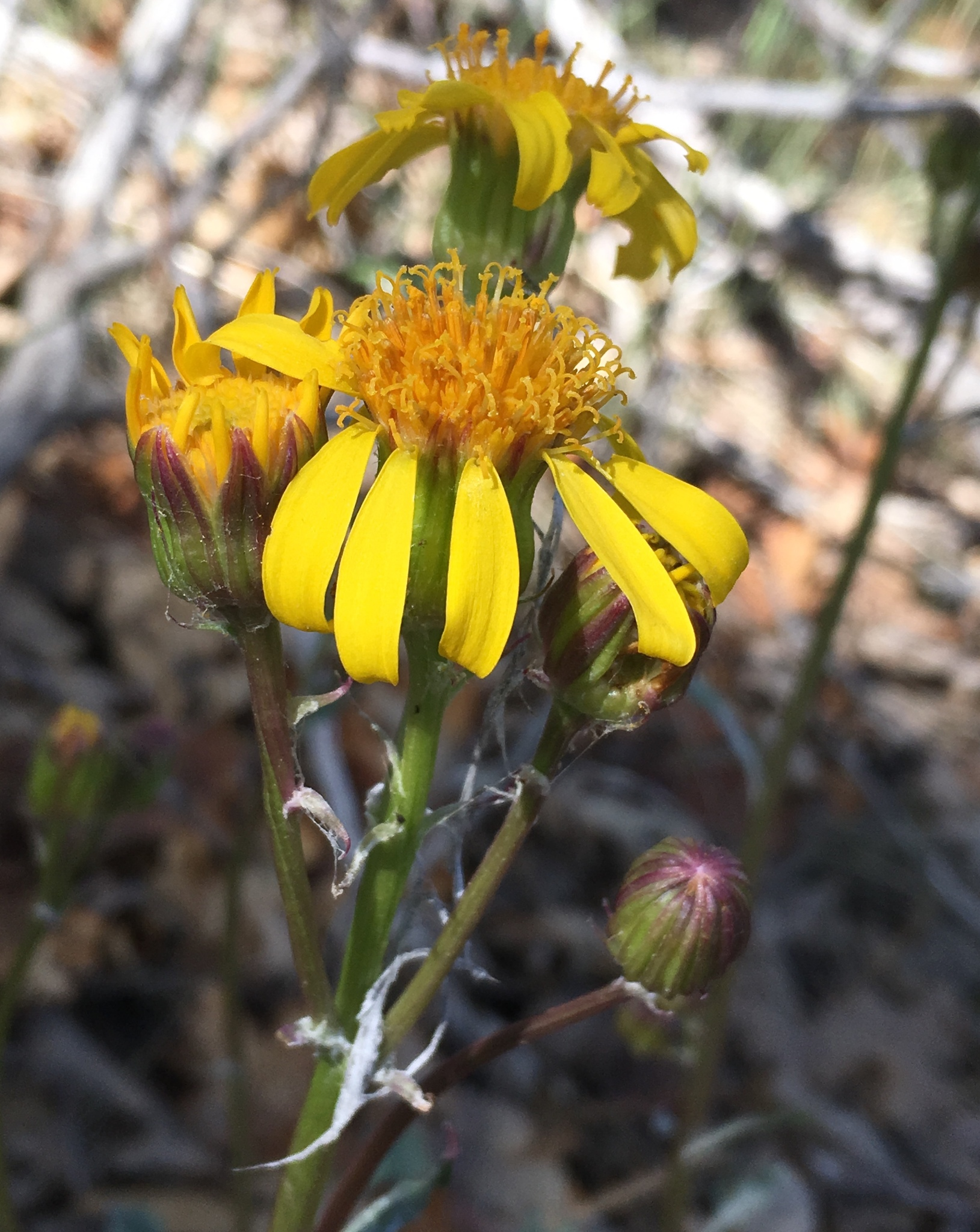

Conservation status
- Imperiled (NatureServe)

Scientific classification
- Kingdom: Plantae
- Clade: Tracheophytes
- Clade: Angiosperms
- Clade: Eudicots
- Clade: Asterids
- Order: Asterales
- Family: Asteraceae
- Genus: Packera
- Species: P. bernardina

Binomial name
- Packera bernardina (Greene) W.A.Weber & A.Löve

Synonyms
- Senecio bernardinus

= Packera bernardina =

Species of flowering plant

Packera bernardina is a rare species of flowering plant in the aster family known by the common name San Bernardino ragwort.

== Distribution ==
The perennial herb is endemic to the San Bernardino Mountains of southern California, where it is known from about twenty occurrences.

It grows in mountain pine forests and the unique pebble plain habitat type of the local region.

== Description ==
Packera bernardina is a perennial herb growing 30 to 50 centimeters in maximum height from a branching caudex and a rosette of basal leaves; several rosettes, each with a stem, may be clustered together. The spatula-shaped leaves have small squared oval blades with toothed edges which are borne on the ends of long petioles. Smaller, simpler leaves occur higher up the stem. The leaves are coated in a very short layer of woolly hairs.

The inflorescence contains several flower heads, each lined with hairy green phyllaries. The head contains many golden yellow disc florets and generally either 8 or 13 yellow ray florets each up to a centimeter long. The fruit is an achene with a body about a millimeter long tipped with a pappus of 3 or 4 millimeters. The bloom period is May to July.
