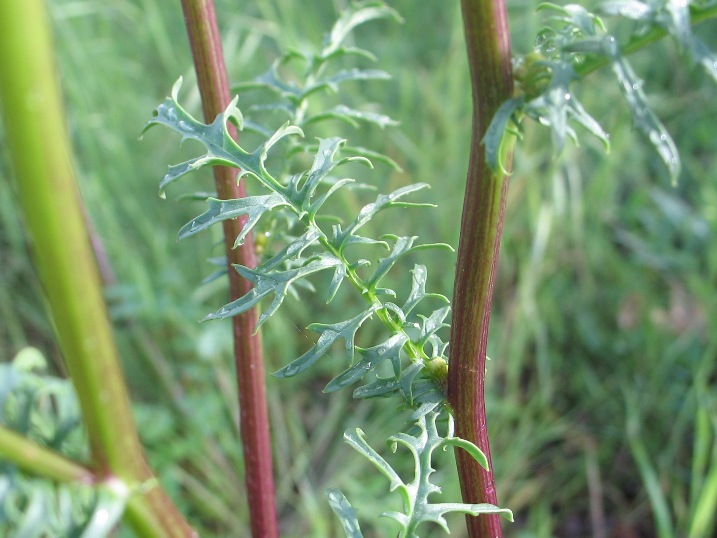

Scientific classification
- Kingdom: Plantae
- Clade: Tracheophytes
- Clade: Angiosperms
- Clade: Eudicots
- Clade: Asterids
- Order: Asterales
- Family: Asteraceae
- Genus: Packera
- Species: P. breweri

Binomial name
- Packera breweri (Burtt Davy) W.A.Weber & Á.Löve

Synonyms
- Senecio breweri Burtt Davy; Senecio breweri var. contractus Greenm.

= Packera breweri =

Species of flowering plant

Packera breweri is a species of flowering plant in the aster family, Asteraceae. It is known by the common name Brewer's ragwort. It is endemic to central California, where it occurs in the woodlands and grasslands of the Central Coast Ranges. They are more frequently found in mid-southern counties of California near the coast, such as Kern or Monterey.

It is a biennial or perennial herb producing one erect stem from a fibrous root and caudex unit. It grows to a maximum height near one meter or slightly taller. It is mostly hairless, but sometimes has tufts of hairs in the leaf axils. The leaves may be up to 30 centimeters long near the base of the plant, their blades so deeply divided into lobes they appear to have leaflets. Each lobe is edged with teeth. Leaves occurring higher on the stem are smaller with narrower lobes.

It tends to flower during its bloom period in April and May. The inflorescence contains many flower heads, each lined with green phyllaries. The head contains many golden yellow disc florets and generally either 8 or 13 narrow yellow ray florets each measuring 1 to 2 centimeters long. The fruit is an achene around a centimeter long, including its pappus of bristles.
