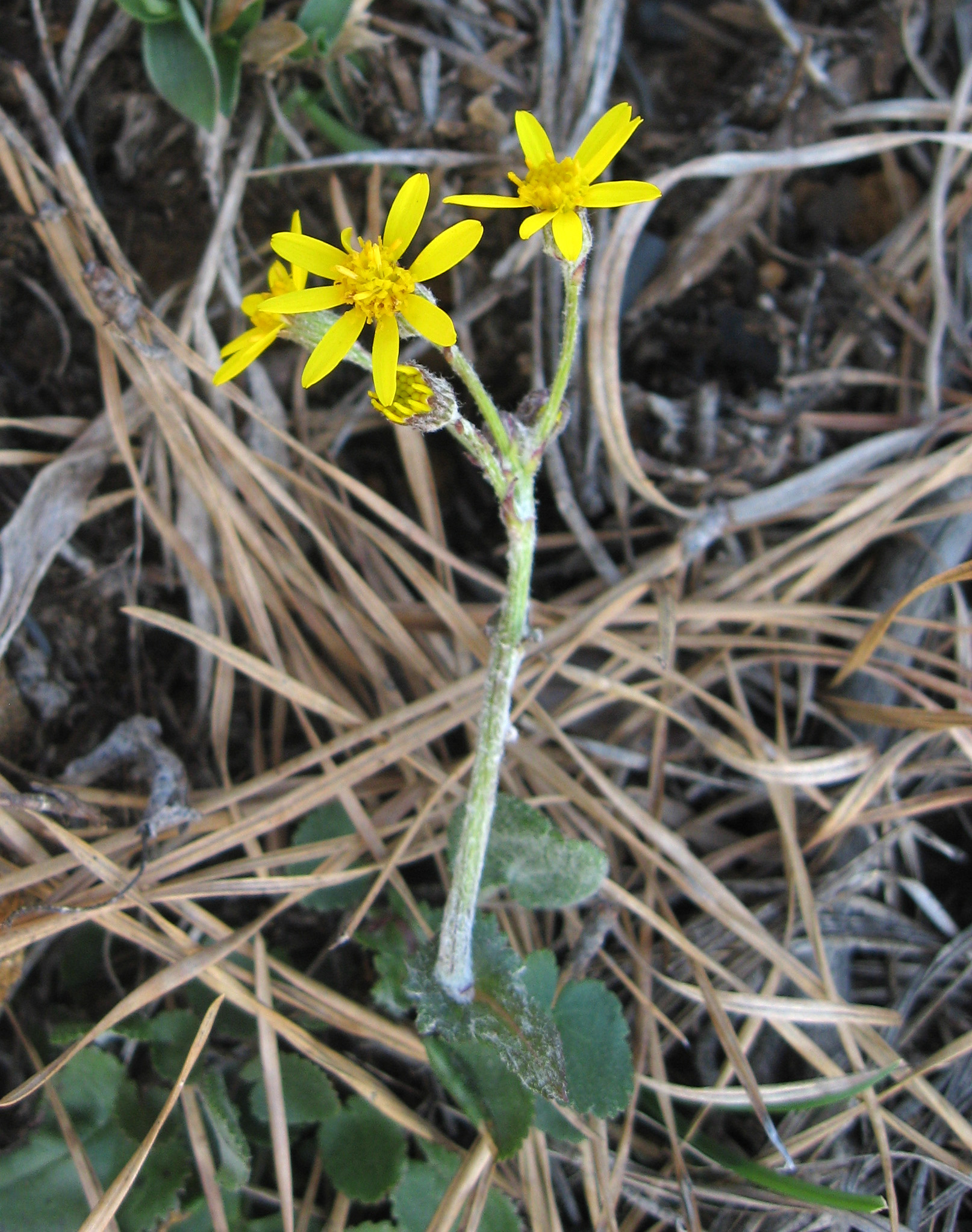

Scientific classification
- Kingdom: Plantae
- Clade: Tracheophytes
- Clade: Angiosperms
- Clade: Eudicots
- Clade: Asterids
- Order: Asterales
- Family: Asteraceae
- Tribe: Senecioneae
- Genus: Packera
- Species: P. serpenticola

Binomial name
- Packera serpenticola Boufford, Kartesz, S.H. Shi & Renchao Zhou

= Packera serpenticola =

Species of flowering plant

Packera serpenticola, commonly known as serpentine ragwort, is a species of flowering plant in the composite family.

It is native to the Southeastern United States, where it is known only from a single site in Clay County, North Carolina, called the Buck Creek Serpentine Barrens. This is an area of serpentine soil derived from olivine and dunite that prevent forest growth, and is instead naturally barrens and savannas. This grassland community is known to harbor many rare species, including one other single-site endemic Symphyotrichum rhiannon, the Buck Creek aster.

The identity of this unusual population of Packera had been an ongoing source of confusion before it was formally described as a new species in 2014. It appears to be most closely related to Packera aurea, which it is distinct from genetically.

It produces yellow heads of flowers in early spring.
