= Packera cardamine =

Scientific classification
- Kingdom: Plantae
- Clade: Tracheophytes
- Clade: Angiosperms
- Clade: Eudicots
- Clade: Asterids
- Order: Asterales
- Family: Asteraceae
- Genus: Packera
- Species: P. cardamine

Binomial name
- Packera cardamine (Greene) W.A.Weber & Á.Löve

Synonyms
- Senecio cardamine

Species of flowering plant

Packera cardamine is a species of flowering plant in the aster family known by the common name bittercress ragwort.

It is endemic to Arizona and New Mexico in the Southwestern United States.
