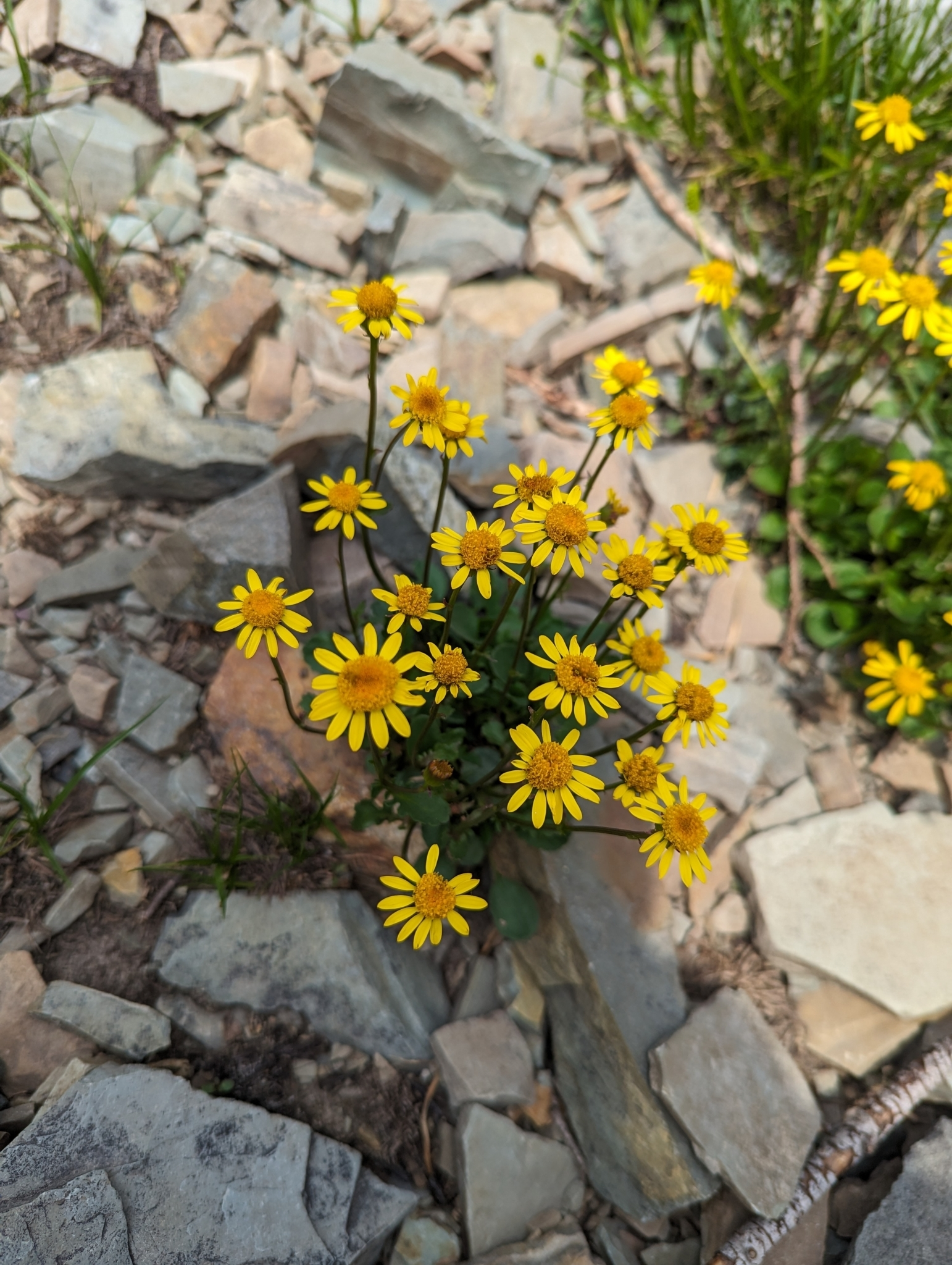

Scientific classification
- Kingdom: Plantae
- Clade: Tracheophytes
- Clade: Angiosperms
- Clade: Eudicots
- Clade: Asterids
- Order: Asterales
- Family: Asteraceae
- Genus: Packera
- Species: P. subnuda

Binomial name
- Packera subnuda (DC.) Trock & T.M.Barkley

Synonyms
- Packera buekii; Senecio cymbalarioides

= Packera subnuda =

Species of flowering plant

Packera subnuda is a species of flowering plant in the aster family known by the common names Buek's groundsel and cleftleaf groundsel. It is native to western North America from the Northwest Territories to northern California to Wyoming, where it grows in high mountain meadows in subalpine and alpine climates.

It is a perennial herb producing one upright stem or a small cluster of two or three stems from a rhizome and/or fibrous root system. The stems grow approximately 5 to 30 centimeters (2.0 to 11.8 in) tall. The basal leaves have fleshy oval blades up to 3 or 4 centimeters (1.2 or 1.6 in) long borne on petioles, with leaves higher up the stem smaller and simpler.

The inflorescence is a single flower head, or occasionally two to five heads. Each is lined with reddish or green phyllaries with green or bluish tips. The head contains many golden yellow disc florets and usually 13 yellow ray florets, each roughly 1 centimeter (0.39 in) long.
