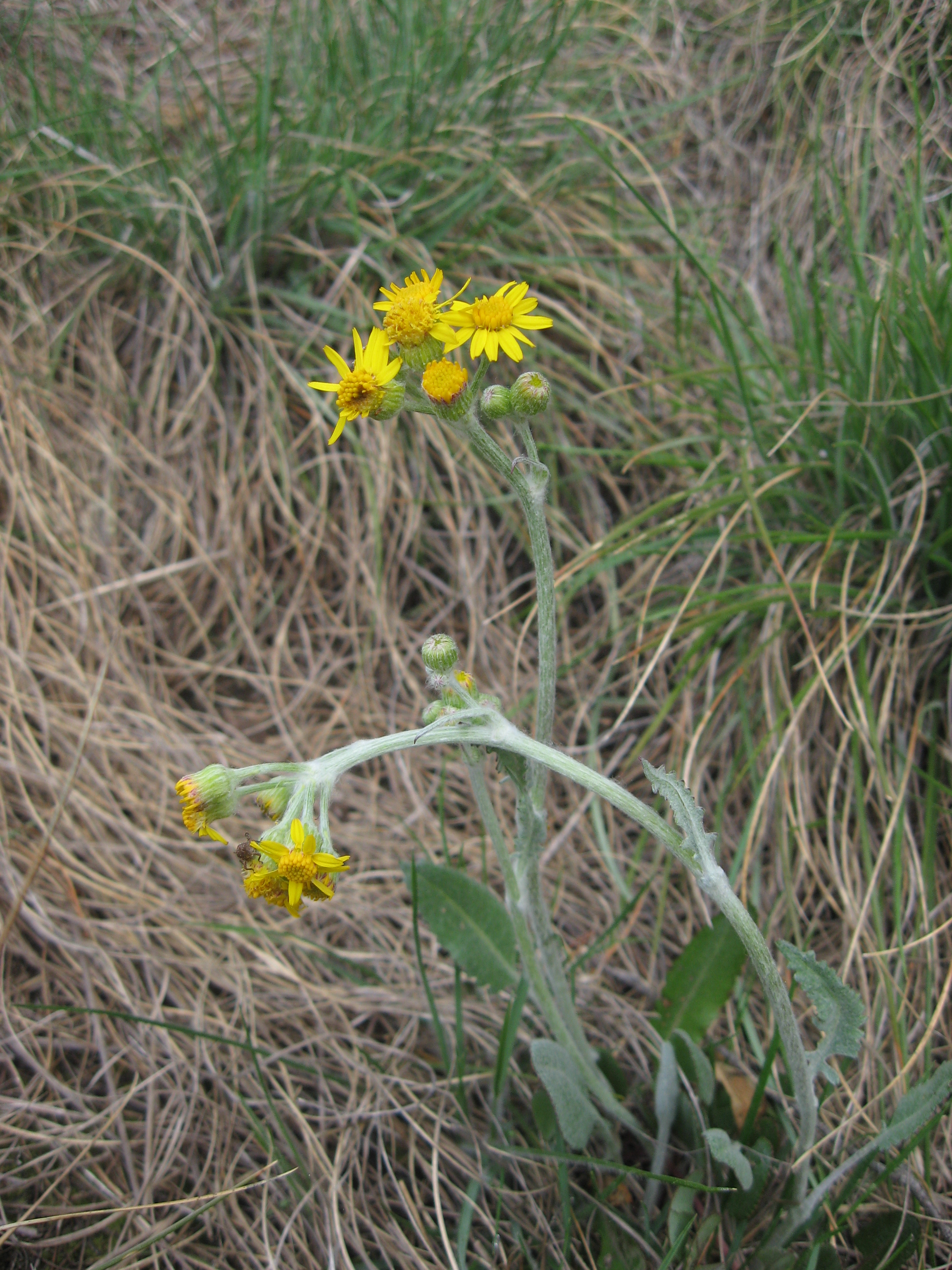

Scientific classification
- Kingdom: Plantae
- Clade: Embryophytes
- Clade: Tracheophytes
- Clade: Spermatophytes
- Clade: Angiosperms
- Clade: Eudicots
- Clade: Asterids
- Order: Asterales
- Family: Asteraceae
- Genus: Packera
- Species: P. dubia

Binomial name
- Packera dubia (Spreng.) Trock & Mabb.

Synonyms
- Cineraria diversifolia F.Dietr., nom. superfl.; Cineraria dubia Spreng.; Cineraria heterophylla Pursh, nom. illeg.; Cineraria integrifolia Pursh, nom. illeg.; Packera tomentosa C.Jeffrey; Senecio alabamensis Britton ex Small; Senecio dubius (Spreng.) L.C.Beck; Senecio tomentosus Michx., nom. illeg.

= Packera dubia =

Species of flowering plant

Packera dubia (synonym Packera tomentosa), often known by the name woolly ragwort, is a perennial species of flowering plant in the Asteraceae family. It is native to the southeastern United States, primarily to the coastal plain but extending into some areas inland and is common throughout its range, where it typically inhabits open, sandy areas and granitic outcrops. This species produces a head of yellow flowers in late spring. Its seeds have been shown to vary in mass within a single flower head as an adaptation to improve dispersal in disturbed habitats.

== Description ==
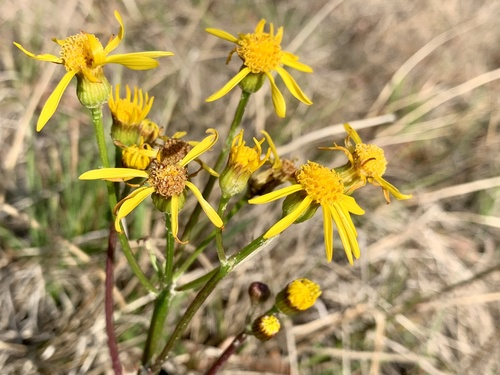
Packera dubia open flower

This plant has bright yellow flower heads with relatively small, narrow ray petals and a large central yellow disk composed of disc florets. There are around 10-13 petals on each flower head and 50-60 disc florets making up the center of the flower. These plants do not typically grow to be taller than two feet and span from 30–60 cm (1–2 ft) in height. They have leaves that grow around the base of the plant that are thin and covered with small hairs. The basal leaves are long and leaf size decreases higher up the stem. Packera dubia leaves vary in leaf margins and are either subentire, crenate, or serrate-dentate. The basal and surrounding leaves nearby grow out at around a 45 degree angle from the stem. The peduncles have bracts with hairs on them. After blooming, Packera dubia produces a cypsela, a small, dry fruit with one seed and an inferior ovary.

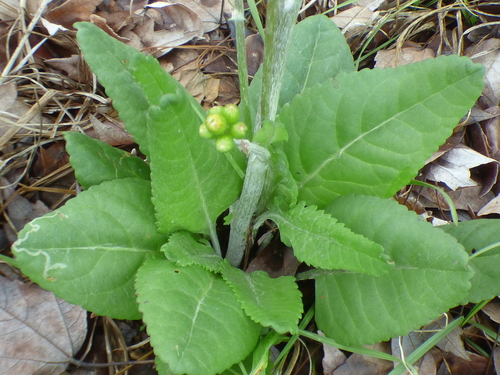
Packera dubia basal leaves

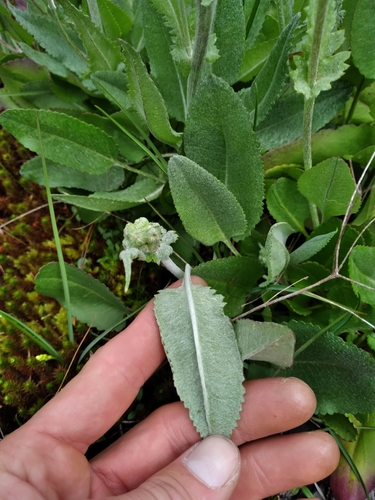
Underside of Packera dubia leaf

== Taxonomy ==
According to Plants of World Online, Packera dubia is classified within the phylum Streptophyta, class Equisetopsida, subclass Magnoliidae, and order Asterales. Packera dubia is currently a part of the Asteraceae family.

While this species was considered a part of the Senecio genus, it was moved to the Packera genus after studies found that Senecio species in North America were very different from the rest of the Senecio genus. A DNA sequencing study found that the genus Packera originated in Mexico before it diverged into different lineages in the United States including Packera dubia.

In a study that tracked the morphological differences in Packera dubia between different regions indicates that Packera dubia may include more than one distinct taxonomic group. The variation between specimens in Piedmont and Mid Atlantic Regions compared to the Atlantic Coastal Plain and the Gulf Coastal Plain was particularly high when comparing the leaf morphology and indumentum (hairiness) of the plants, distinguishing features of Packera dubia. The authors suggest that future taxonomic research is warranted to determine if this species should be split into two different taxonomic groups.

Due to revisions in this taxonomy over time, Packera dubia has homotypic synonyms including Cineraria diversifolia, Cineraria dubia, and Senecio dubious. It also has many heterotypic synonyms as well including Cineraria heterophylla, Cinceraria integrifolia, Cinceraria integrifolius var. heterophyllus, Packera tomentosa (commonly used), Senecio alabamensis, and Senecio tomentosus.

== Habitat and distribution ==
Packera dubia is distributed throughout the middle and southeast of the United States. According to Ladybird Johnson Wildflower Center, this species can be found in the states of Alabama, Arkansas, Delaware, Florida, Georgia, Louisiana, Maryland, Missouri, North Carolina, New Jersey, Oklahoma, South Carolina, Texas, and Virginia. Packera dubia is more prominent in coastal areas than in inland regions. In Maryland, for instance, Packera dubia is much more prominent in the eastern region closer to the coast.

Packera dubia thrives in a moderate climate that experiences all the seasons. Furthermore, according to the National Wetland Indicator Status, Packera dubia typically does not prefer wetlands, although is still able to survive in wetlands if needed.

== Ecology ==
Packera dubia is a perennial species, with a lifespan of longer than two years. Packera dubia begins to flower in March and continues into early June, with blooming rates generally highest around April and May.

While specific information on the pollination of Packera dubia is limited, members of the Asteraceae family are often pollinated by insects. This family of flowering plants typically uses secondary pollination to push pollen out onto hairs that make it easily accessible to a wide range of pollinators. If outcrossing does not work, some of these species are able to self pollinate as well.

Packera dubia's morphology varies across the species' range making this species difficult to identify at times. Fleming's study found that Packera dubia plants in the Piedmont and Mid Atlantic Regions had more hairs on the leaves and stem and generally larger basal leaves. On the other hand, the Atlantic Coastal Plain and the Gulf Coastal Plain (warmer, more coastal) plants had lower hair density and smaller, narrower leaves.

A 2013 study reported that Packera dubia also has different types of seeds as a form of protection in disturbed environments. While all the seeds within these plants look very similar, the inner seeds tend to be heavier and germinate quicker while the seeds on the peripheral of the plant are lighter and slower to germinate. This varying germination speed increases the likelihood of a plant's survival and persistence under unpredictable conditions.

A moth species, Phyllocnistis insignis, feeds on the leaves of Packera dubia. However, many species within the Packera and the closely related Senecio genus are known to be toxic to many species as they contain pyrrolizidine alkaloids. However, there is not much research specifically on the toxicity of the Packera dubia species.

In regard to conservation status, Packera dubia populations are thriving and the species is considered to be at low risk of extinction.
