= Packera antennariifolia =

Scientific classification
- Kingdom: Plantae
- Clade: Tracheophytes
- Clade: Angiosperms
- Clade: Eudicots
- Clade: Asterids
- Order: Asterales
- Family: Asteraceae
- Genus: Packera
- Species: P. antennariifolia

Binomial name
- Packera antennariifolia (Britton) W.A.Weber & Á.Löve

Synonyms
- Senecio antennariifolius Britt. Source: ITIS, NRCS

Species of flowering plant

Packera antennariifolia, the shale barren ragwort, is a species of the genus Packera and family Asteraceae.

It is endemic to Maryland, Pennsylvania, Virginia, and West Virginia. It is found in the Appalachian Mountains.
