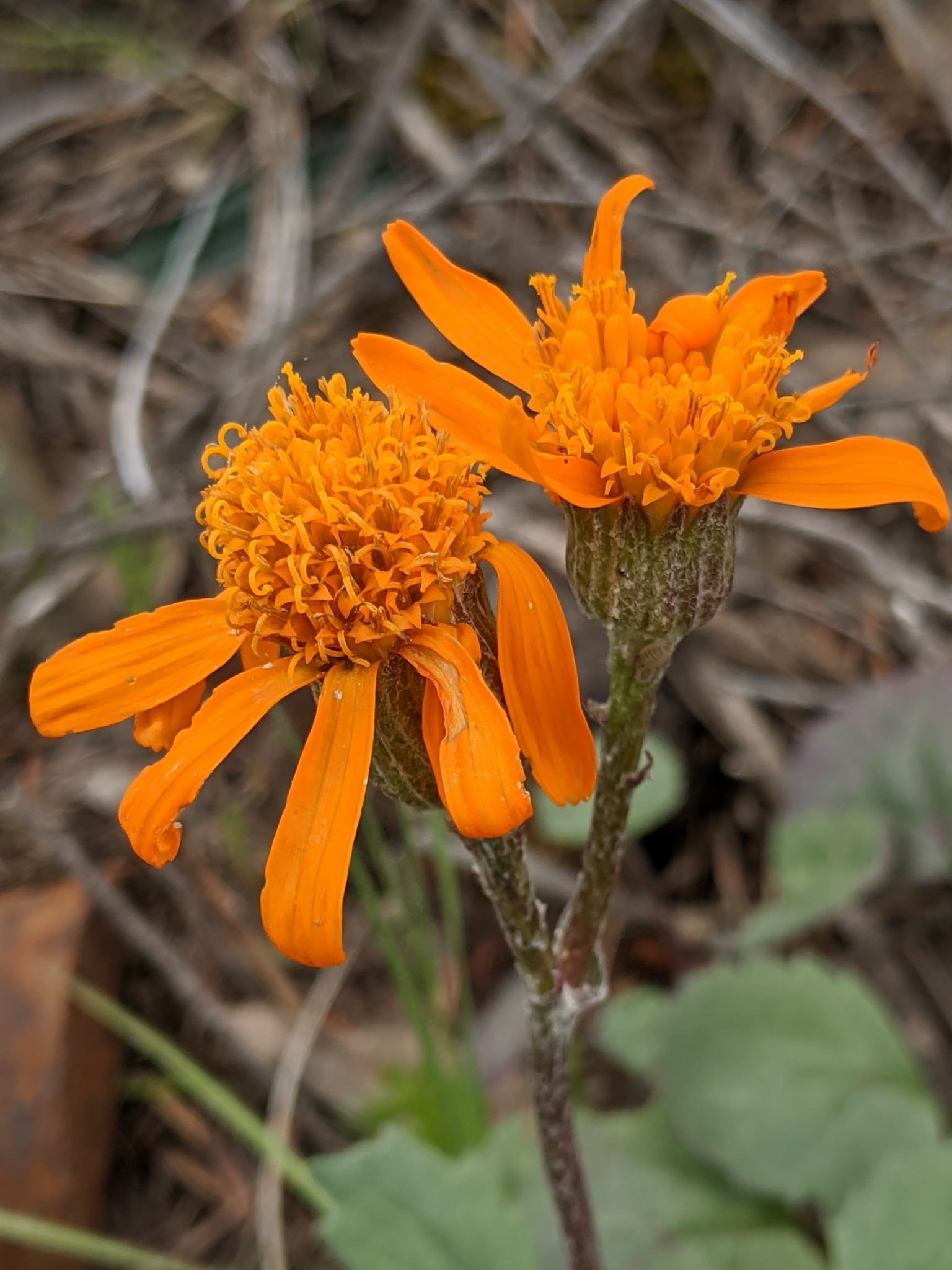

Scientific classification
- Kingdom: Plantae
- Clade: Tracheophytes
- Clade: Angiosperms
- Clade: Eudicots
- Clade: Asterids
- Order: Asterales
- Family: Asteraceae
- Genus: Packera
- Species: P. greenei

Binomial name
- Packera greenei (A.Gray) W.A.Weber & Á.Löve

Synonyms
- Senecio greenei

= Packera greenei =

Species of flowering plant

Packera greenei is a species of flowering plant in the aster family known by the common name flame ragwort. It is endemic to northern California, where it is known from the North Coast Ranges and southern Klamath Mountains. It is a resident of dry mountain scrub habitat, often on serpentine soils.

It is a perennial herb producing a single stem with a basal rosette of leaves from a rhizome. It generally grows 20 to 30 centimeters tall. The basal leaves have oval blades up to 5 or 6 centimeters long borne on long petioles. They are green, usually with purple undersides. Smaller leaves may occur higher up the stem.

The inflorescence contains one or more flower heads, each lined with woolly, green- or red-tipped phyllaries. The head bears up to 13 narrow ray florets which are a distinctive orange or red-orange in color. They may approach 2 centimeters long.
