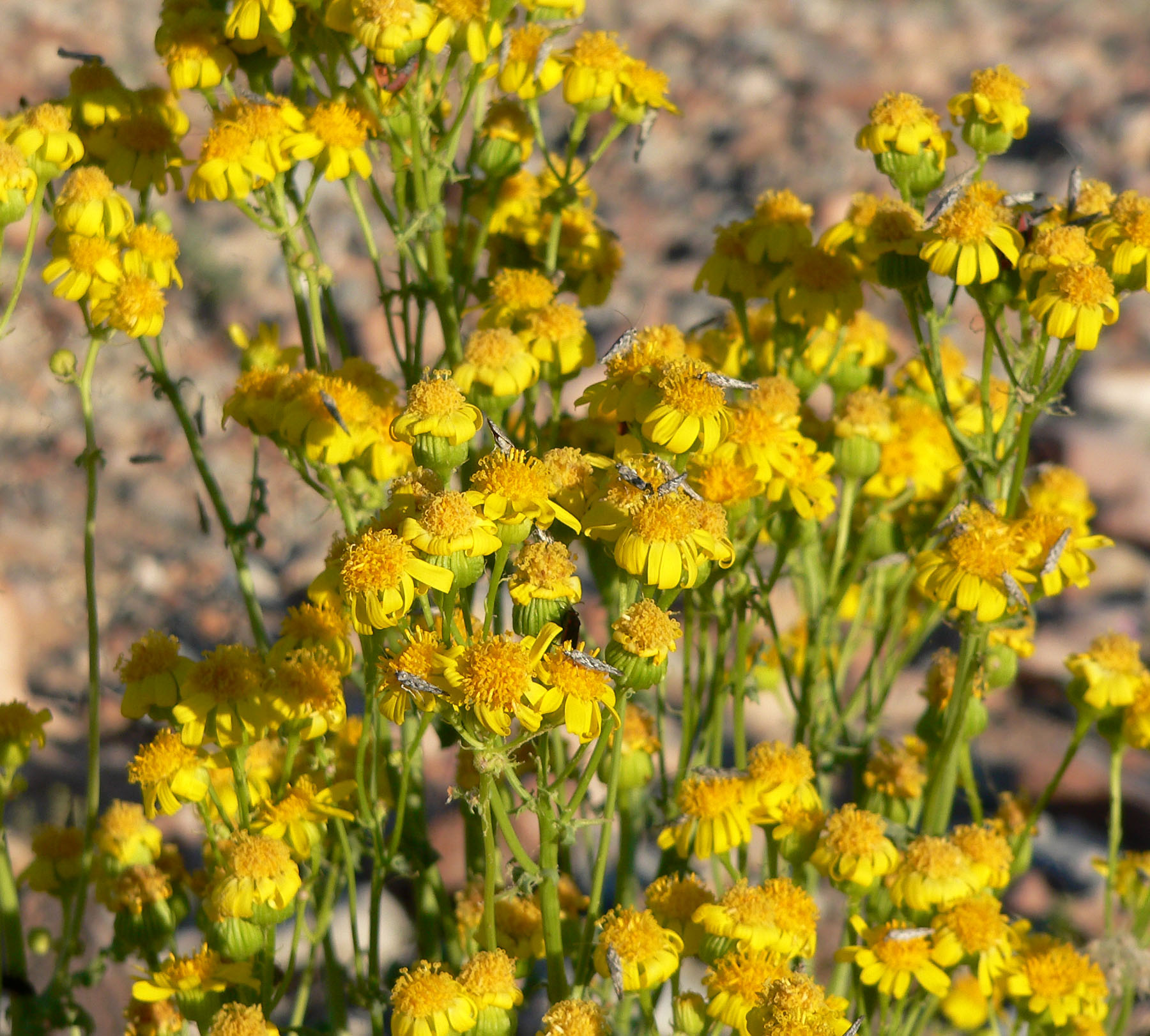

Conservation status
- Secure (NatureServe)

Scientific classification
- Kingdom: Plantae
- Clade: Tracheophytes
- Clade: Angiosperms
- Clade: Eudicots
- Clade: Asterids
- Order: Asterales
- Family: Asteraceae
- Genus: Packera
- Species: P. multilobata

Binomial name
- Packera multilobata (Torr. & A.Gray ex A.Gray) W.A.Weber & Á.Löve

Synonyms
- Senecio multilobatus Torr. & A.Gray ex A.Gray

= Packera multilobata =

Species of flowering plant

Packera multilobata is a species of flowering plant in the aster family known by the common name lobeleaf groundsel. It is native to the western United States from California to Wyoming to New Mexico, where it is common and can be found in many habitat types.

It is an annual or perennial herb producing a single stem or a cluster of several stems up to about half a meter tall from a taproot and branching caudex unit. The leaves are divided into several lobes, often so deeply that they look like separate leaflets. The inflorescence is a wide array of flower heads lined with green or yellowish phyllaries and containing many yellow disc florets. Most heads have a fringe of yellow ray florets, but at times these can be absent.

Parts of this plant were used medicinally by Native American peoples including the Navajo and Yavapai.
