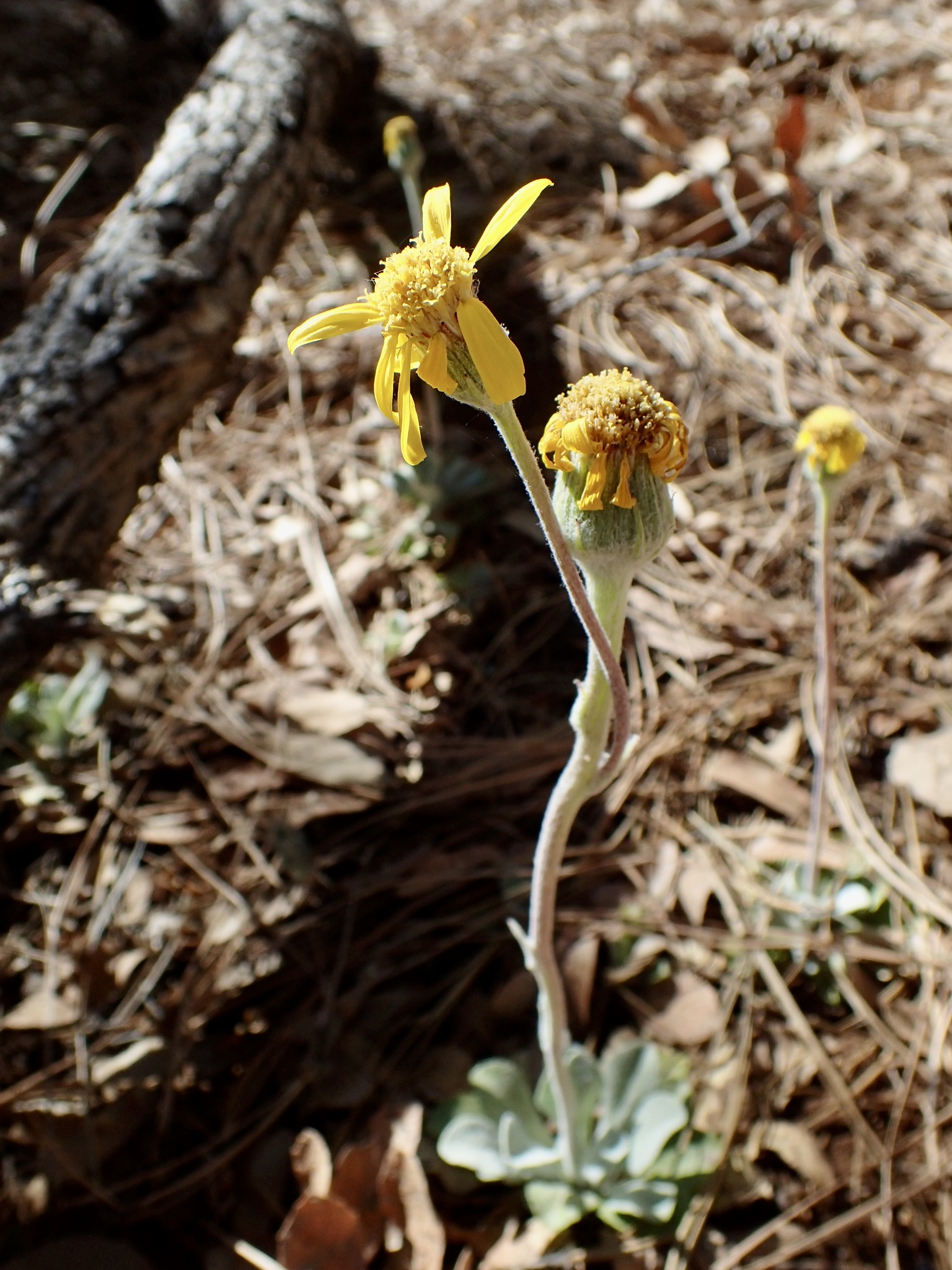

Scientific classification
- Kingdom: Plantae
- Clade: Tracheophytes
- Clade: Angiosperms
- Clade: Eudicots
- Clade: Asterids
- Order: Asterales
- Family: Asteraceae
- Genus: Packera
- Species: P. actinella

Binomial name
- Packera actinella (Greene) W.A.Weber & Á.Löve

Synonyms
- Senecio actinella Greene; Senecio mogollonicus Greene

= Packera actinella =

Species of herb

Packera actinella, synonym Senecio actinella, is a flowering plant in the family Asteraceae. Known as flagstaff ragwort, it is a perennial herb native to Arizona, New Mexico, and part of northern Mexico. It is an arid land plant, sending up solitary flowering heads on long stalks above a perennial basal mat in ponderosa pine forests.
