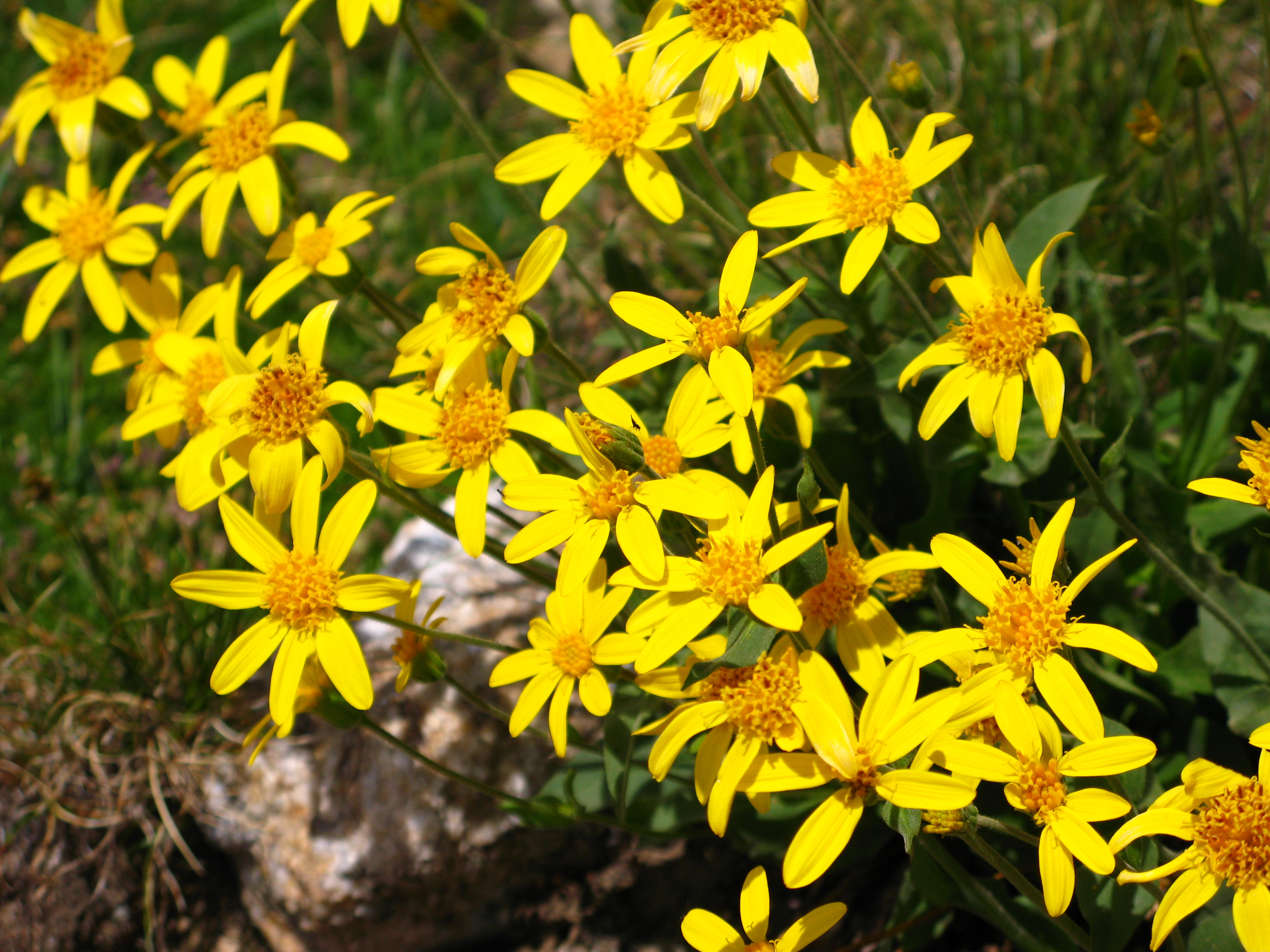

Conservation status
- Secure (NatureServe)

Scientific classification
- Kingdom: Plantae
- Clade: Tracheophytes
- Clade: Angiosperms
- Clade: Eudicots
- Clade: Asterids
- Order: Asterales
- Family: Asteraceae
- Genus: Packera
- Species: P. werneriifolia

Binomial name
- Packera werneriifolia (A.Gray) W.A.Weber & Á.Löve

Synonyms
- Senecio werneriifolius

= Packera werneriifolia =

Species of flowering plant

Packera werneriifolia, known by the common names alpine rock butterweed and hoary groundsel, is a species of flowering plant in the aster family. It is native to the western United States in the Sierra Nevada mountain habitat in subalpine and alpine climates, including forests and barren talus.

== Description ==
It is a perennial herb which is usually small but is otherwise variable in appearance. It grows up to about 15 centimeters tall from a basal rosette of thick, linear or oval leaves a few centimeters long; leaf morphology varies from the western to the eastern regions of the plant's range. The basal leaves are woolly, white to greenish and tufted with smooth and nearly entire (smooth-edged) leaf margins and multiple 4 to 8 inches (10 to 20 cm), nearly leafless stems bearing 1-6 flower heads.

The inflorescence bears a single flower head or a cluster of a few heads and may be nearly hairless to quite woolly. The flower head contains up to 40 yellow disc florets, and usually either 8 or 13 yellow ray florets, though these are sometimes absent. It blooms from July to August.

== Habitat and range ==
It is a low growing perennial plant that can be found growing in the severe conditions of the high northern and central Sierra Nevada range, from 10,000 to 13,000 feet (3,000 to 4,000 m) in elevation.
