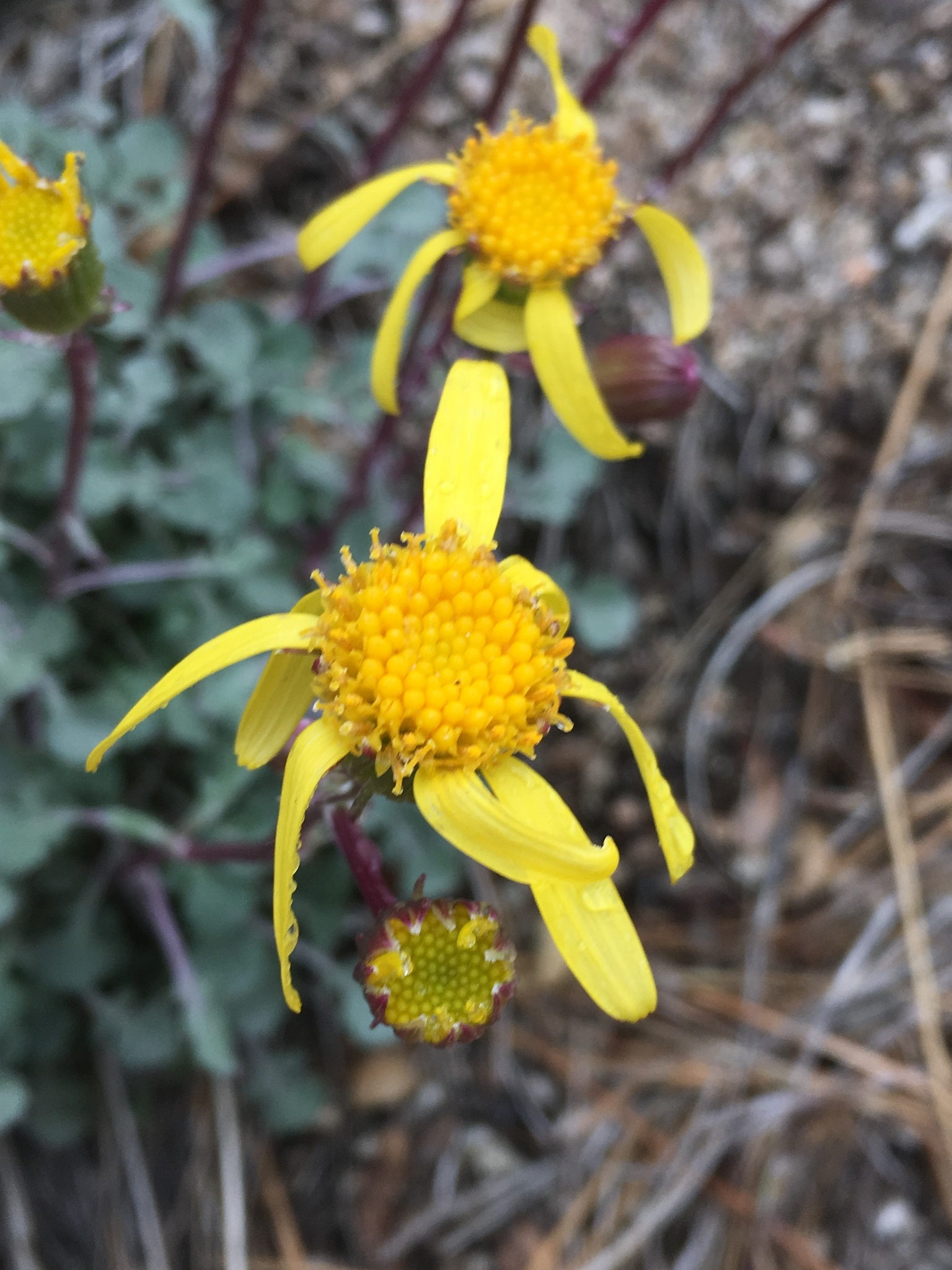

Scientific classification
- Kingdom: Plantae
- Clade: Tracheophytes
- Clade: Angiosperms
- Clade: Eudicots
- Clade: Asterids
- Order: Asterales
- Family: Asteraceae
- Genus: Packera
- Species: P. ionophylla

Binomial name
- Packera ionophylla (Greene) W.A.Weber & Á.Löve

Synonyms
- Senecio ionophyllus

= Packera ionophylla =

Species of flowering plant

Packera ionophylla is an uncommon species of flowering plant in the aster family known by the common name Tehachapi ragwort. It is endemic to California, where it is known from the Tehachapi Mountains, the San Gabriel and San Bernardino Mountains, and Alamo Mountain near the Grapevine. It grows in mountain forest habitat.

It is a perennial herb producing one or more erect stems up to 30 to 50 centimeters tall from a rhizome or taproot and caudex unit. It is slightly hairy to woolly or cobwebby in texture. The thick leaves have lobed blades one or two centimeters long borne on petioles. The inflorescence holds one or more flower heads containing many disc florets and usually several ray florets, though these may be absent.
