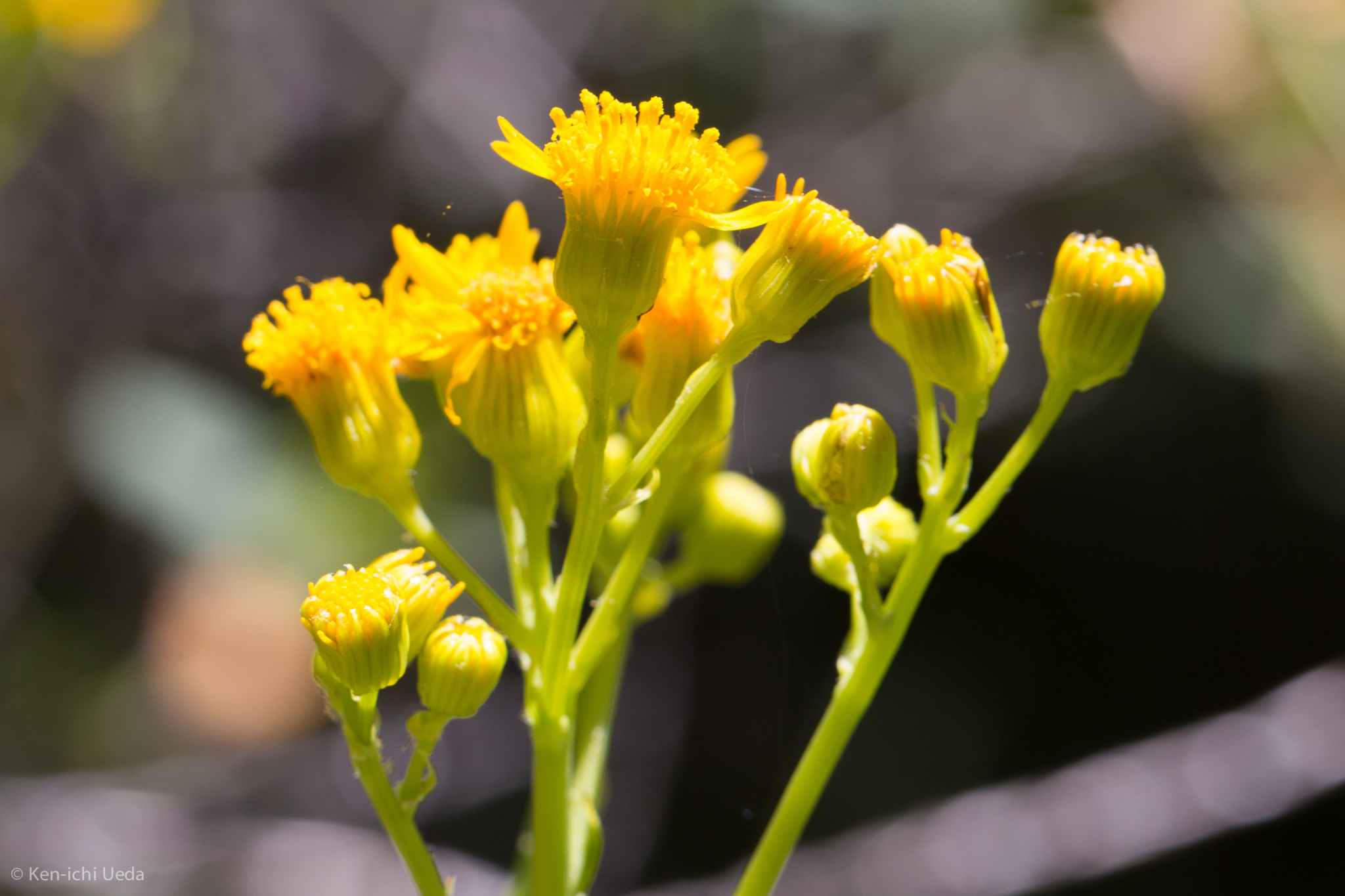

Scientific classification
- Kingdom: Plantae
- Clade: Tracheophytes
- Clade: Angiosperms
- Clade: Eudicots
- Clade: Asterids
- Order: Asterales
- Family: Asteraceae
- Genus: Packera
- Species: P. clevelandii

Binomial name
- Packera clevelandii (Greene) W.A.Weber & Á.Löve

Synonyms
- Senecio clevelandii

= Packera clevelandii =

Species of flowering plant

Packera clevelandii is an uncommon species of flowering plant in the aster family known by the common name Cleveland's ragwort. It is endemic to California, where it is known from only two small regions, a section of the North Coast Ranges around Napa County and a part of the Sierra Nevada foothills on the opposite side of the Sacramento Valley. The plant grows in shrubby chaparral on serpentine soils.

It is a perennial herb producing one or more erect stems from a taproot and caudex unit, reaching up to a meter in maximum height. The leaves are thick and fleshy, and have a waxy coating. Their blades are up to 10 centimeters long at the base of the plant, and smaller farther up.

The inflorescence contains several flower heads, each lined with green- or purple-tipped phyllaries (flower bract). The head contains many golden yellow disc florets and 8 to 13 narrow yellow ray florets each under a centimeter long.
