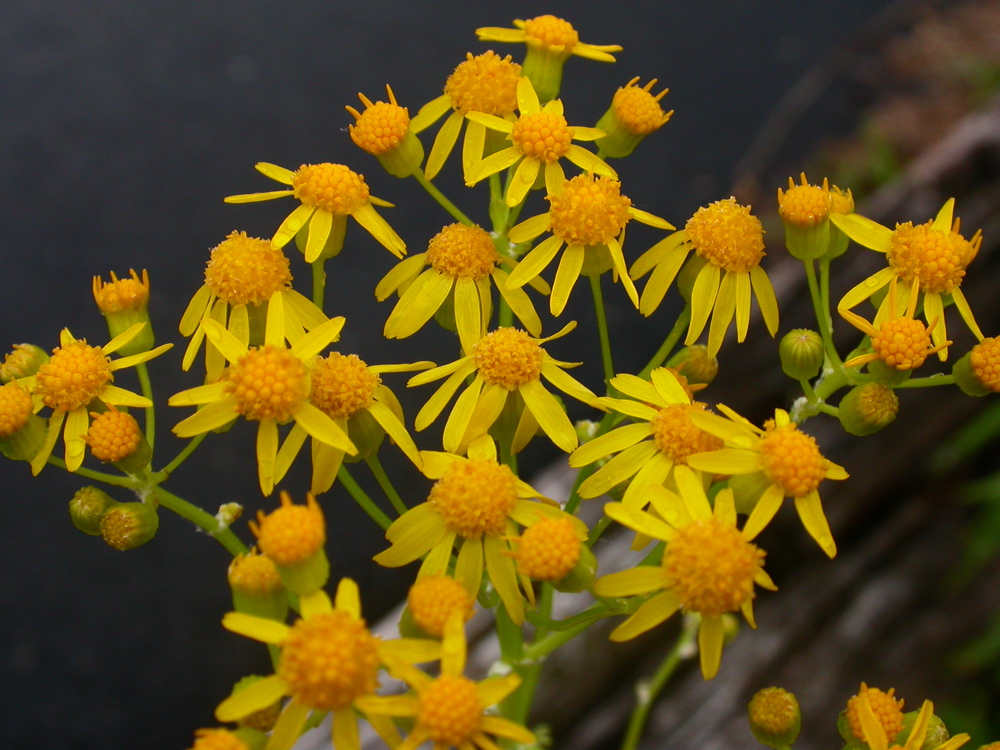
- Small's ragwort

Scientific classification
- Kingdom: Plantae
- Clade: Tracheophytes
- Clade: Angiosperms
- Clade: Eudicots
- Clade: Asterids
- Order: Asterales
- Family: Asteraceae
- Genus: Packera
- Species: P. anonyma

Binomial name
- Packera anonyma (Wood) W.A.Weber & Á.Löve

Synonyms
- Senecio anonymus Alph. Wood; Senecio smallii Britton; Source: NRCS

= Packera anonyma =

Species of flowering plant

Packera anonyma, called Appalachian ragwort and Small's ragwort, is a flowering plant in the Asteraceae (aster family).

== Distribution and habitat ==
A perennial herb native to the lower Northeastern United States and across the Southeastern United States, it is found in regions including the Appalachian Mountains and the southeastern Great Lakes states. It inhabits rock outcrops, roadsides, woods, and disturbed areas.

== Description ==
Packera anonyma produces abundant yellow flowers in May and early June. It blooms April to May in the South, and early June to mid-July in the North.
