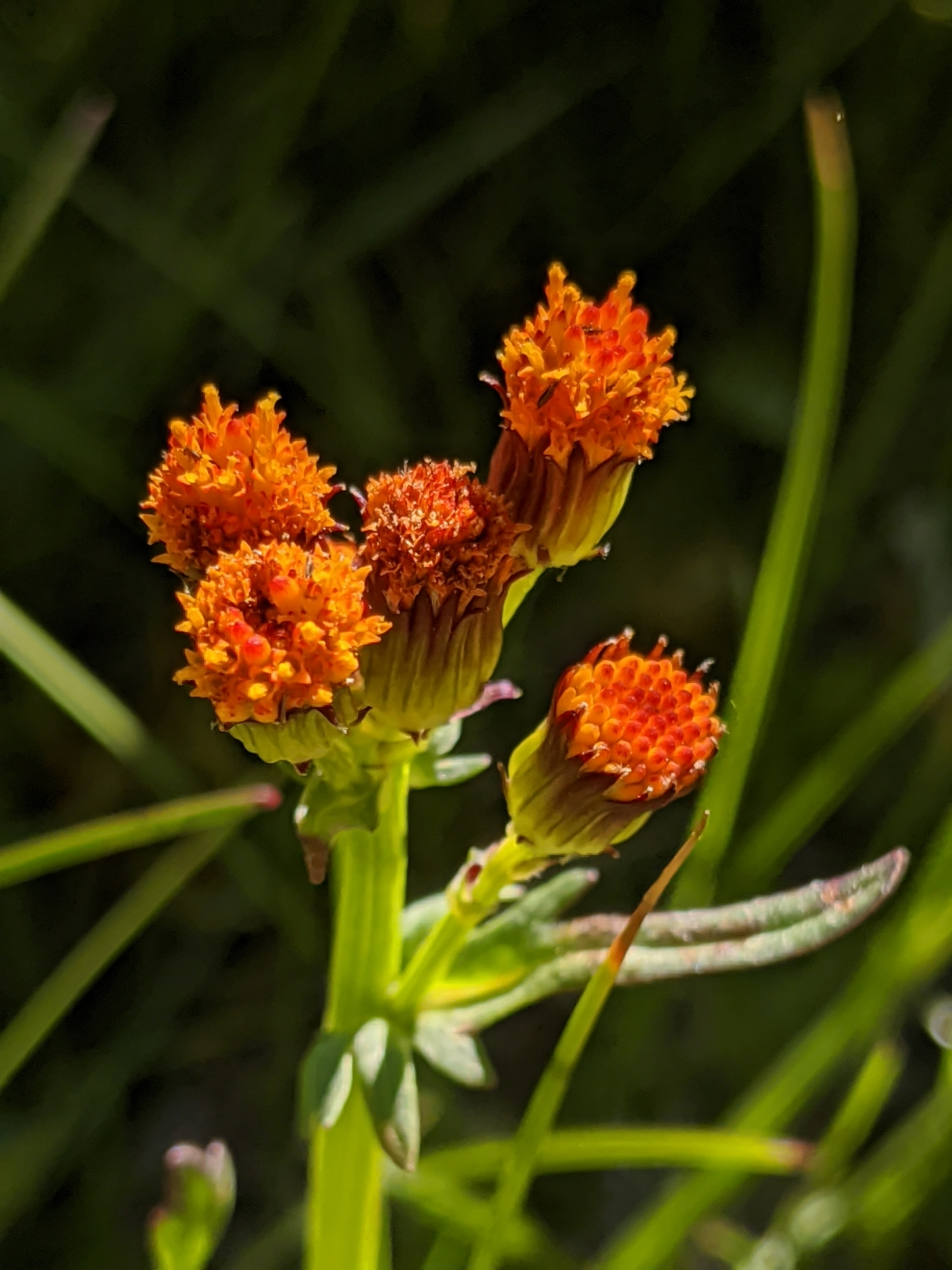

Scientific classification
- Kingdom: Plantae
- Clade: Tracheophytes
- Clade: Angiosperms
- Clade: Eudicots
- Clade: Asterids
- Order: Asterales
- Family: Asteraceae
- Genus: Packera
- Species: P. pauciflora

Binomial name
- Packera pauciflora (Pursh) Á.Löve & D.Löve

Synonyms
- Senecio pauciflorus

= Packera pauciflora =

Species of flowering plant

Packera pauciflora is a species of flowering plant in the aster family known by the common name alpine groundsel. It is native to northern North America, where it can be found in parts of western and eastern Canada and the northwestern United States. It grows in subalpine and alpine climates, such as mountain meadows.

It is a perennial herb producing one or more erect stems up to half a meter tall from a thick caudex and fibrous root system. The basal leaves have thick, toothed blades up to 4 centimeters long, and those higher on the stem have smaller, more dissected leaves. The inflorescence bears a single flower head or an umbel-shaped array of up to 6 heads. Each head has green to reddish or purplish phyllaries, many disc florets, and often several ray florets. The florets may be most any shade of red, orange, or yellow. The specific epithet pauciflora is Latin for 'few-flowered'.
