= Five Mile Creek (disambiguation) =

Five Mile Creek is an Australian television series.

Five Mile Creek or Fivemile Creek may also refer to:

- Fivemile Creek (Altamaha River tributary), a stream in Georgia
- Fivemile Creek (Spring River), a stream in Missouri and Oklahoma
- Fivemile Creek (Youngs Creek), a stream in Missouri
- Fivemile Creek (Susquehanna River), a stream in New York
- Fivemile Creek (East Branch Oil Creek tributary), a stream in Crawford County, Pennsylvania
- Fivemile Creek (Wood County, Wisconsin), a stream in Wood and Portage counties, Wisconsin

== See also ==
- Fivemile Branch
- Five Mile River (disambiguation)
