= Gypsum flora of Nova Scotia =

Group of plants in Nova Scotia, Canada

The gypsum flora of Nova Scotia refers to a small group of plants that are restricted to naturally occurring outcrops of gypsum. Nova Scotia is unique in northeastern North America for the extent of sites having gypsum bedrock at or near the soil surface. The distinctive set of plants associated with these gypsum exposures includes Packera paupercula (Balsam groundsel), Carex eburnea (Ebony sedge), Erigeron hyssopifolius (Hyssop-leaved fleabane), Cypripedium parviflorum (Small yellow lady’s-slipper). Karst landscapes have also formed. Some of these species appear to be associated with sunny clearings created by natural erosion from gypsum cliffs, which provides a distinctive sunny and calcareous habitat within landscapes that are otherwise forested.

== Distribution and status ==
Some of the more important gypsum sites occur in the Windsor area of western Hants County along Five Mile River, around the Baddeck area in southern Victoria County, the Ninevah area in Inverness County, and near Antigonish in Antigonish County. Many of these sites are threatened by gypsum mining and logging.

== Global significance ==
Gypsum floras are well-documented in other parts of the world, but are sufficiently rare in eastern North America that they are not mapped in a recent world-wide review on the topic.

== See also ==
- Alvar
- Calcareous grassland
- Chalk heath
- Edaphic
- Gypcrust
- Rendzina
