= Rendzina =

Humus-rich shallow soil type

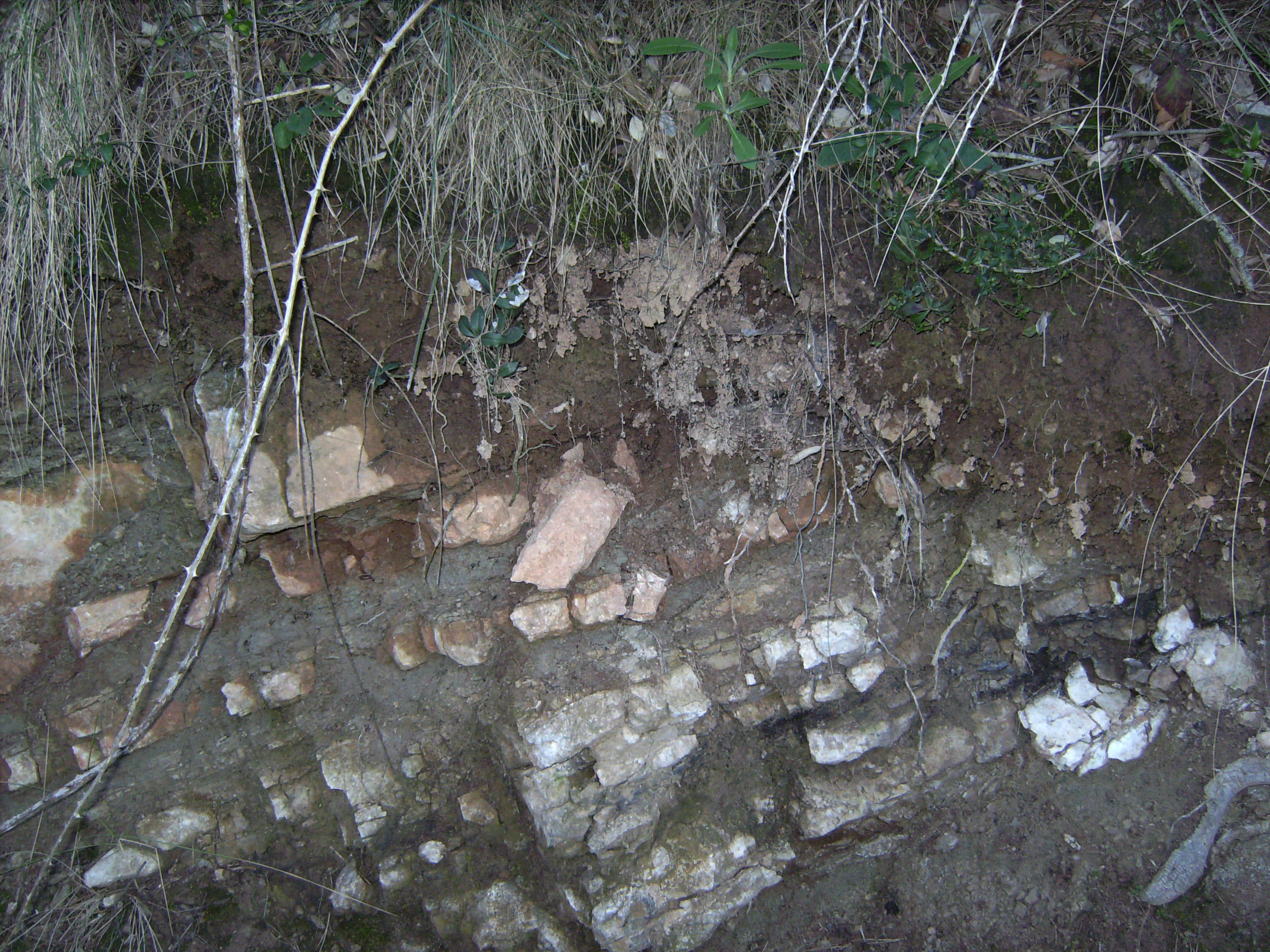
Rendzina soil (Castelltallat)

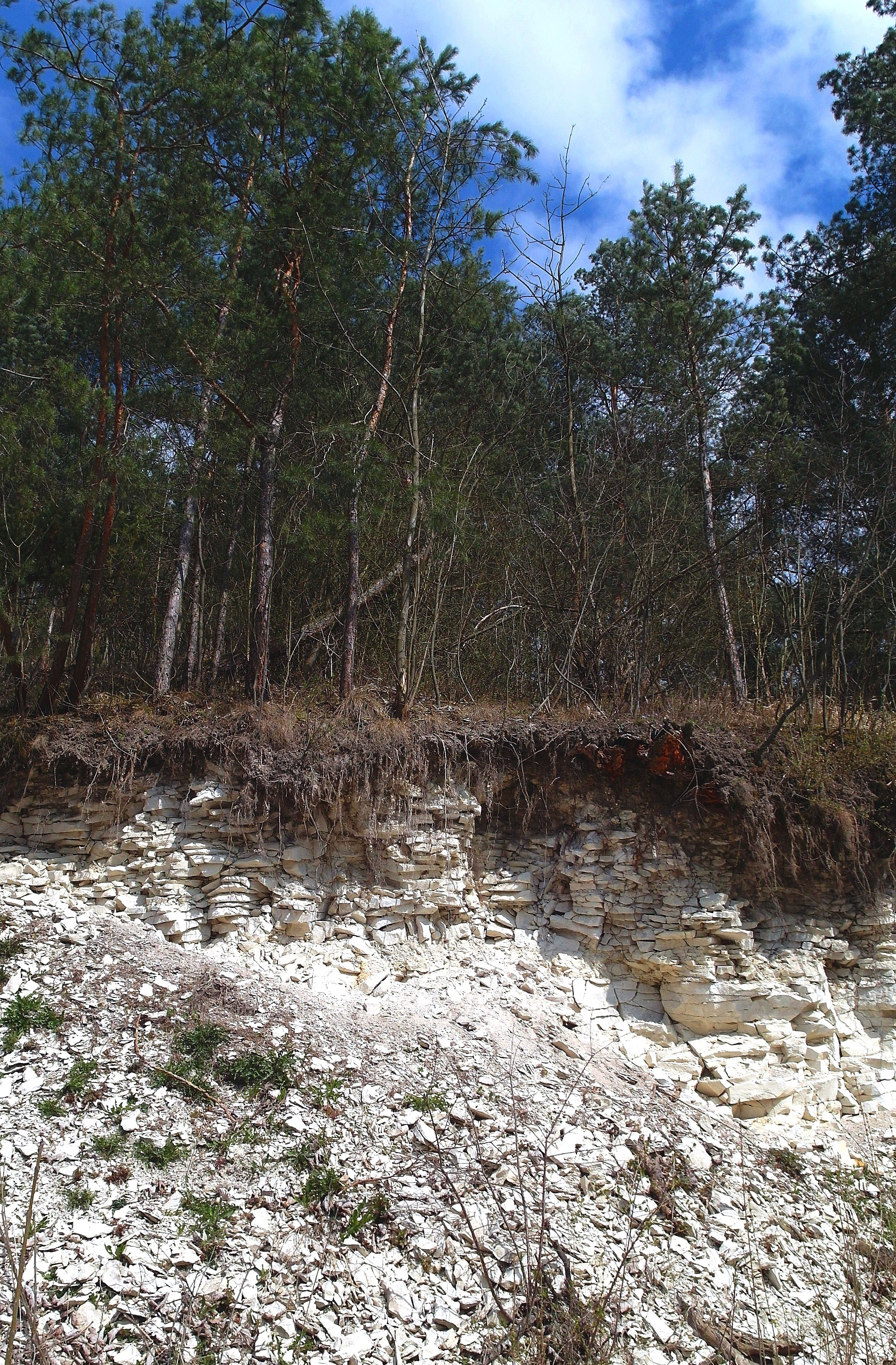
Rendzina soil on the Maastrichtian Chalk in Kozubów Landscape Park, Poland

Rendzina (or rendsina) is a soil type recognized in various soil classification systems, including those of Britain and Germany as well as some obsolete systems. They are humus-rich shallow soils that are usually formed from carbonate- or occasionally sulfate-rich parent material. Rendzina soils are often found in karst and mountainous regions.

The term rendzina originated via Russian from the Polish rędzina (the word "rędzina" comes from the old Polish word "rzędzić" (to speak, to drone).

In the World Reference Base for Soil Resources, rendzina soils would be classified as leptosols, chernozems, kastanozems, or phaeozems, depending on their specific characteristics.

== Development and distribution ==
Rendzina soils typically develop from solid or unconsolidated rocky material that is carbonate- or sulphate-rich. Limestone is by far the most common, but others include dolomite, gypsum, marble, chalk and marlstone. Alongside physical weathering, which breaks down the structure of rocky material, chemical weathering, in particular the dissolution of carbonate, contributes to rendzina development. When water with dissolved carbon dioxide comes into contact with carbonate minerals, the carbonate is dissolved and leaches out with the water. The overall reaction is as follows:

CaCO_{3}_{(s)} + H_{2}O_{(l)} + CO_{2}_{(aq)} → 2 HCO^{−}_{3}_{(aq)} + Ca^{2+}_{(aq)}

Loss of soluble minerals leaves the upper part of the soil enriched in insoluble materials, particularly clay minerals. At the same time, biological activity leads to an accumulation of humus in the surface soil, which is protected from further decomposition by the clay. The upper soil horizon of a rendzina therefore contains considerable amounts of humus. It can also be relatively carbonate- or gypsum-rich, although at levels much lower than in the rocky parent material. Progressive breakdown of the parent material and loss of carbonate or gypsum will ultimately convert a rendzina into another soil type. Since these processes occur relatively fast in comparison to weathering of most carbonate- and gypsum-free materials, rendzinas represent a transitory stage in soil development. However, they can persist over the long term if soil loss by erosion counteracts the soil development process.

Typical areas for rendzina soils are in karst and mountain landscapes, where carbonate-rich material occurs on slopes. They are common in scarpland, wherever limestone is exposed. The rendzinas in Wales, for example constitute a simple A-C profile, a dark calcareous topsoil immediately over shattered limestone.

== Properties and use ==
The combined effects of clay and humus content produce dark colours and crumb structure. Typical pH for Rendzina soils is between 5 and 8, and base saturation is high. Calcium and magnesium are abundant, but potassium content is often low, so nutrient imbalances are common.

Rendzina soils are usually poorly suited to agricultural use. Mechanical tillage is hindered by their shallowness, and the small soil volume limits their capacity to store and supply water. Additionally, these soils often occur on slopes, where the risk of erosion is high. As a result, there is much semi-natural vegetation to be found in these areas.

== See also ==
- 1938 USDA soil taxonomy
- Alvar
- Calcareous grassland
- Chalk heath
- Downland
- Edaphic
- FAO soil classification
- Gypcrust
- Gypsum flora of Nova Scotia
