= Five mile =

Five Mile or 5 Mile can refer to:

- 5 Mile, the Red Hose 5 Mile Race, a cross country race in Scotland
- "5 Mile (These Are the Days)", a song by Turin Brakes
- "5 Miles", a song by James Blunt from Once Upon a Mind, 2019
- Five Mile Airport, in Alaska
- Five Mile Lane, another name for A4226 road in Vale of Glamorgan, Wales
- Five Mile Pond (Plymouth, Massachusetts)
- Five Mile Press, an Australian publishing company
- Five Mile River, in Connecticut
- Five Mile River (East Brookfield River), in central Massachusetts
- Five Mile River, Nova Scotia, Canada
- Five mile road, in Michigan

== See also ==
- Five Mile Bridge (disambiguation)
- Five Mile Creek (disambiguation)
- Five Mile River (disambiguation)
- 8 Mile (disambiguation)
