= Five Mile Bridge =

Five Mile Bridge may refer to:

- Maestri Bridge, across Lake Pontchartrain, Louisiana, United States
- Five Mile Bridge, a listed building in Lyne, Scottish Borders
- Five Mile Bridge, a bridge on Ohio State Route 555 over the Muskingum River
- Five Mile Bridge, a footbridge across the Witham in Fiskerton, Lincolnshire, England

== See also ==
- Five Mile River (disambiguation)
- Five mile (disambiguation)
