= Five Mile River (disambiguation) =

Five Mile River may refer to:

- Five Mile River, a river located in Connecticut's Northeast Corner
  - Five Mile River (Long Island Sound), a river in Fairfield County, Connecticut
- Five Mile River (East Brookfield River)
- Five Mile River, Nova Scotia

== See also ==
- Five Mile Bridge (disambiguation)
- Five Mile Creek (disambiguation)
- Five mile (disambiguation)
