= Caliche =

Calcium carbonate based concretion of sediment

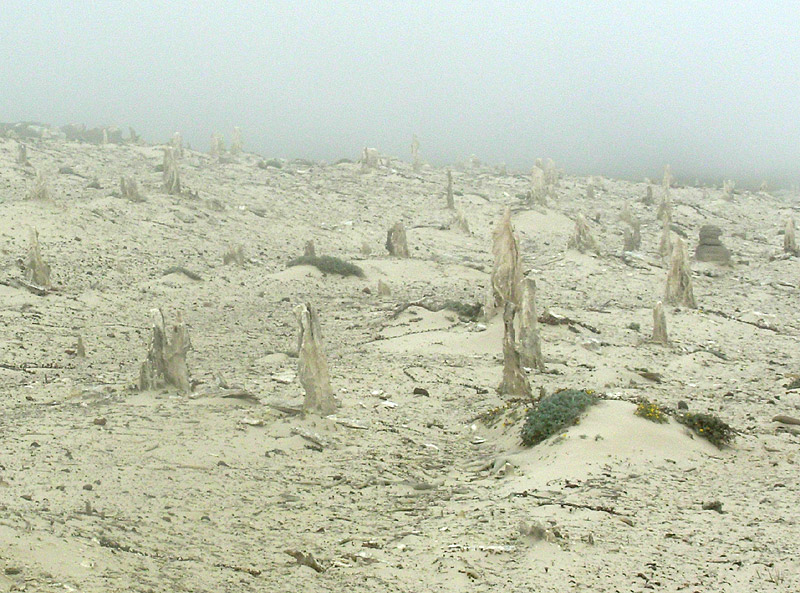
Caliche fossil forest on San Miguel Island, California

Caliche (/kəˈliːtʃiː/) is a soil accumulation of soluble calcium carbonate at depth, where it precipitates and binds other materials—such as gravel, sand, clay, and silt. It occurs worldwide, in aridisol and mollisol soil orders—generally in arid or semiarid regions, including in central and western Australia, in the Kalahari Desert, in the High Plains of the western United States, in the Sonoran Desert, Chihuahuan Desert and Mojave Desert of North America, and in eastern Saudi Arabia at Al-Hasa. Caliche is also known as calcrete, or kankar (in India and the United States). It belongs to the duricrusts. The term caliche is borrowed from Spanish and is originally from the Latin word calx, meaning lime.

Caliche is generally light-colored but can range from white to light pink to reddish-brown, depending on the minerals present. Caliche is a mark of older landscapes. It generally occurs on or very near the surface. Where caliche layers originate at some depth from the soil surface, intact landscapes and buried landscapes are more likely than eroded surfaces to have caliche well below the soil surface. Layers vary from a few inches to feet thick, and multiple layers can exist in a single location. The caliche layer in a soil profile is sometimes called a K horizon.

In northern Chile and Peru, caliche also refers to mineral deposits that include nitrate salts. Caliche can also refer to various claylike deposits in Mexico and Colombia. In addition, it has been used to describe some forms of quartzite, bauxite, kaolinite, laterite, chalcedony, opal, and soda niter.

A similar material, composed of calcium sulfate rather than calcium carbonate, is called gypcrust.

== Formation ==
Caliche forms where annual precipitation is less than 65 centimeters (26 in) per year and the mean annual temperature exceeds 5 °C (41 °F). Higher rainfall leaches excess calcium completely from the soil, while in very arid climates, rainfall is inadequate to leach calcium at all and only thin surface layers of calcite are formed. Plant roots play an important role in caliche formation, by releasing large amounts of carbon dioxide into the A horizon of the soil. Carbon dioxide levels here can exceed 15 times normal atmospheric values. This allows calcium carbonate to dissolve as bicarbonate. Where rainfall is adequate but not excessive, the calcium bicarbonate is carried down into the B horizon. Here there is less biological activity, the carbon dioxide level is much lower, and the bicarbonate reverts to insoluble carbonate. A mixture of calcium carbonate and clay particles accumulates, first forming grains, then small clumps, then a discernible layer, and finally, a thicker, solid bed.

However, caliche also forms in other ways. It can form when water rises through capillary action. In an arid region, rainwater sinks into the ground very quickly. Later, as the surface dries out, the water below the surface rises, carrying up dissolved minerals from lower layers. These precipitate as water evaporates and carbon dioxide is lost. This water movement forms a caliche that is close to the surface. Caliche can also form on outcrops of porous rocks or in rock fissures where water is trapped and evaporates. In general, caliche deposition is a slow process, requiring several thousand years.

The depth of the caliche layer is sensitive to mean annual rainfall. When rainfall is around 35 centimeters (14 in) per year, the caliche layer will be as shallow as 25 centimeters (9.8 in). When rainfall is around 75 centimeters (30 in) per year, the caliche layer will be at a depth of around 125 centimeters (49 in). The caliche layer disappears completely in temperate climates if annual rainfall exceeds 100 centimeters (39 in).

The source of the calcium in caliche may be the underlying bedrock, but caliche can form even over bedrock that is not rich in calcium. This is attributed to calcium brought in as aeolian dust.

== Examples of natural occurrence ==
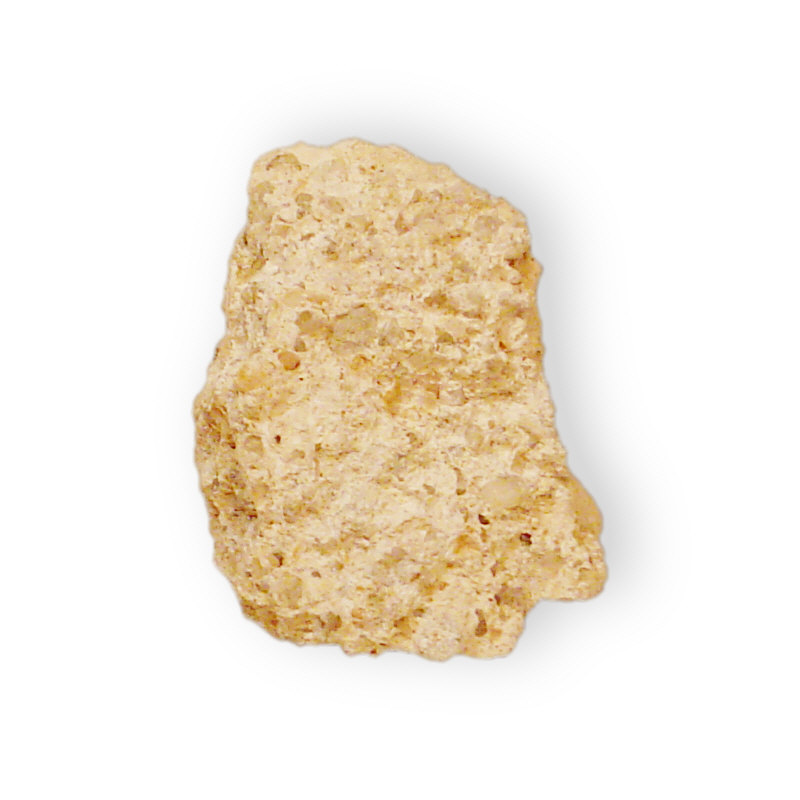
Caliche — sedimentary rock, Ridgecrest, Kern County, California

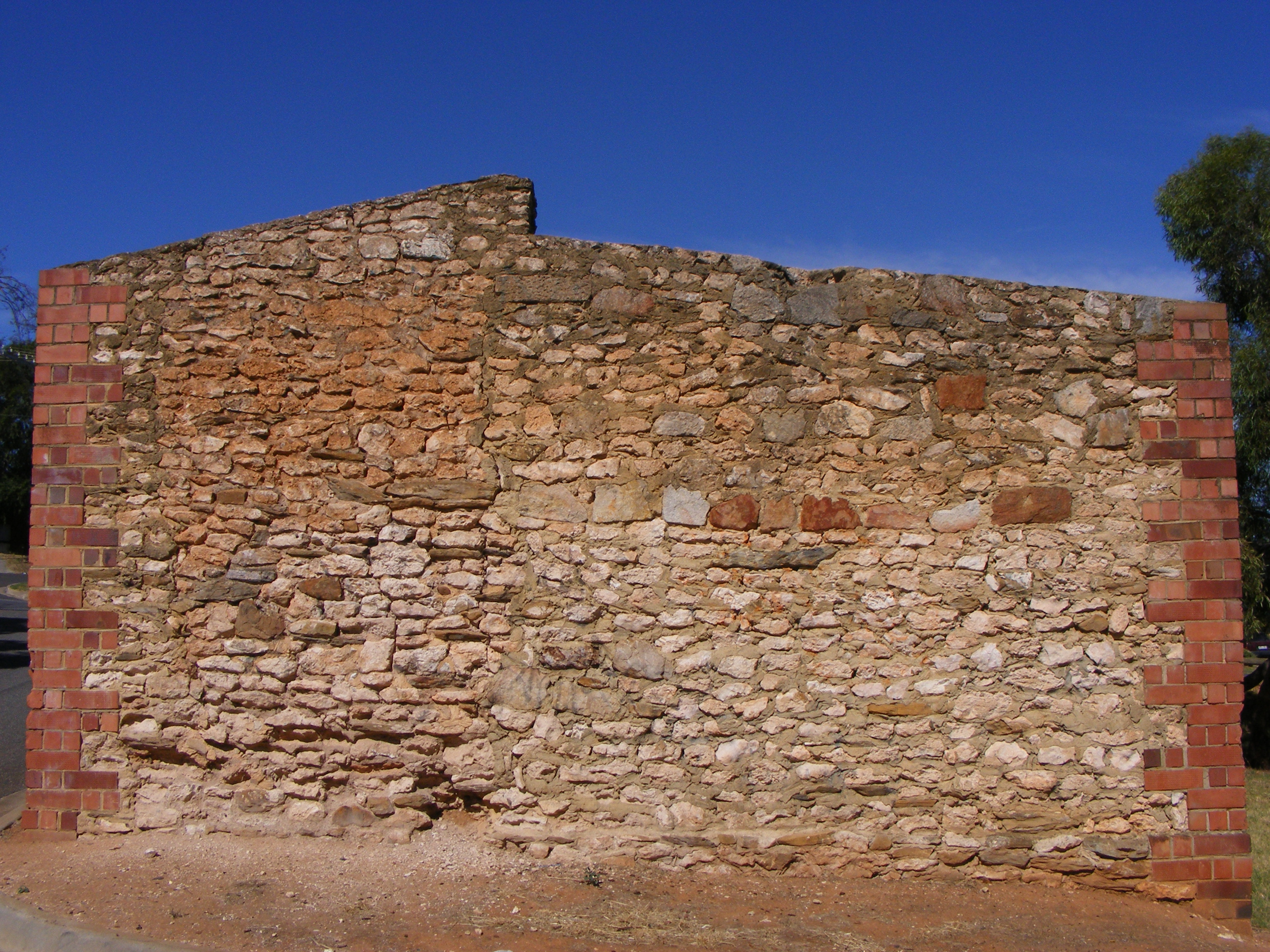
Calcrete rubble was widely used for building construction in South Australia during the 19th century.

While the formation of other caliches is relatively well understood, the origin of Chilean caliche is not clearly known. One possibility is that the deposits were formed when a prehistoric inland sea evaporated. Another theory is that it was deposited due to weathering of the Andes.

One of the world's largest deposits of calcrete is in the Makgadikgadi Pans in Botswana, where surface calcretes occur at the location of a now-desiccated prehistoric lake.

Highly indurated (hardened) caliche is known as calcrete, and it gives rise to characteristic landforms in arid environments. Calcrete is found throughout the geologic record, forming a record of past climate. Examples include Mississippian calcretes in South Wales and Pliocene to Pleistocene caprock of the Llano Estacado of Texas, US, and Mormon Mesa, Nevada, US.

Caliches can store significant amounts of carbon, making them of significance to the overall global carbon cycle.

In Jurassic geological settings, the caliche is often indicator of warm climate with well marked wet-dry seasonality that could indicate seasonal monsoons.

== Economic uses ==
=== Building applications ===
Caliche is used in construction worldwide. Its reserves in the Llano Estacado in Texas can be used in the manufacture of Portland cement; the caliche meets the chemical composition requirements and has been used as a principal raw material in Portland cement production.

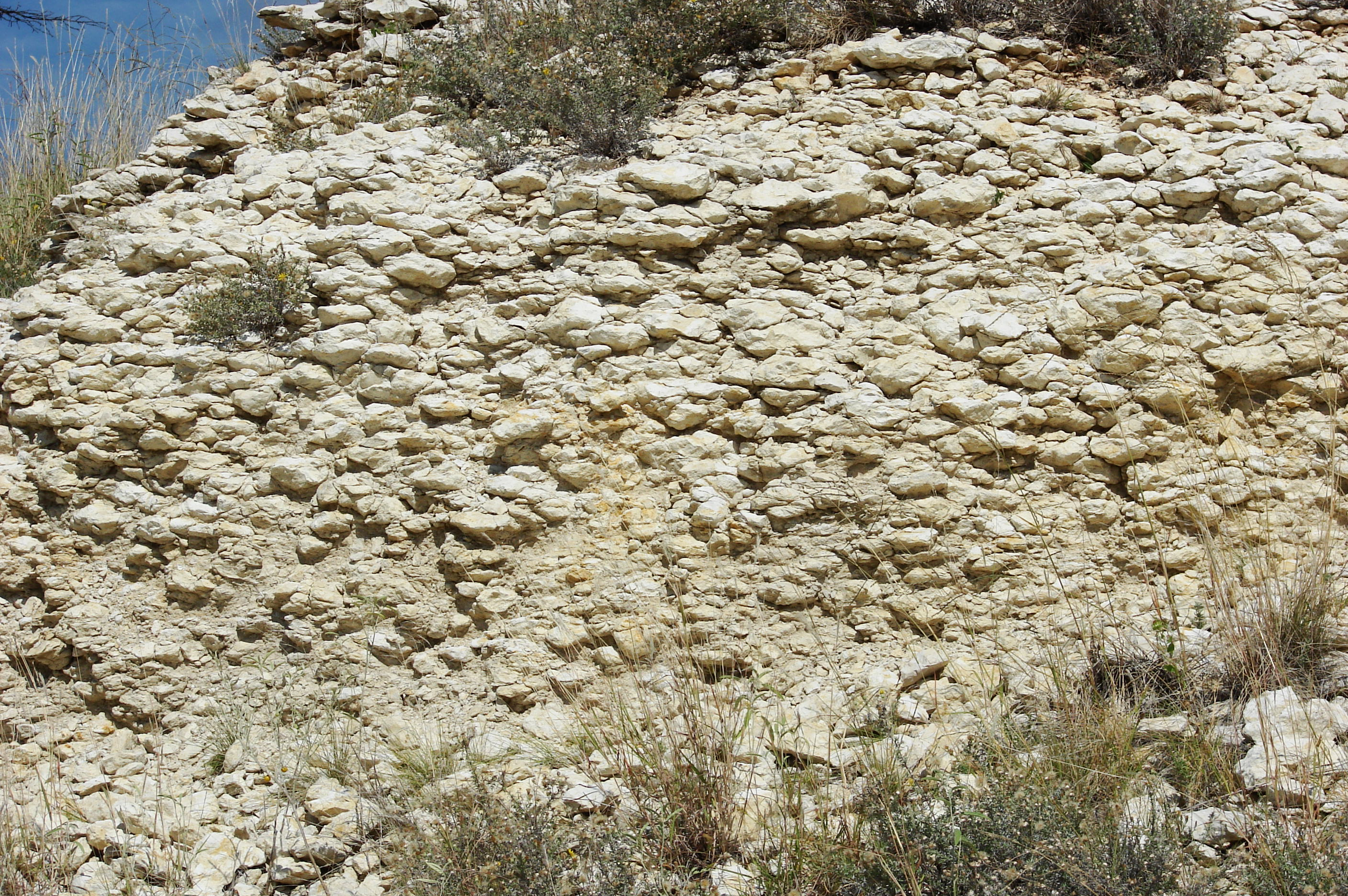
Caliche berm surrounding a stock tank in Central Texas

The Great House at Casa Grande Ruins National Monument, Arizona, US, was built with walls of caliche. Caliche was also used in mortars used in of the Mayan buildings in the Yucatán Peninsula in Mexico. A dormitory in Ingram, Texas, and a demonstration building in Carrizo Springs, Texas, for the United States Department of Energy were also built using caliche as part of studies by the Center for Maximum Potential Building Systems.

In many areas, caliche is also used for road construction, either as a surfacing material, or more commonly, as base material. It is one of the most common road materials used in Southern Africa. Caliche is widely used as a base material when it is locally available and cheap. However, it does not hold up to moisture (rain), and is never used if a hard-rock base material, such as limestone, is available.

=== Sugar refining ===
A nearly pure source of calcium carbonate is necessary to refine sugar. It must contain at least 95% calcium carbonate (CaCO_{3}) and have a low magnesium content. In addition, the material must meet certain physical requirements so it does not break down when burned. Although caliche does not generally meet all of the requirements for sugar refining, it is used in areas where another source of calcium carbonate, such as limestone, is not present. While caliche requires beneficiation to meet the requirements, its use can still be significantly cheaper than shipping in limestone.

=== Chilean caliche ===
In the Atacama Desert in northern Chile, vast deposits of a mixture, also referred to as caliche, are composed of gypsum, sodium chloride and other salts, and sand, associated to salitre ("Chile saltpeter"). Salitre, in turn, is a composite of sodium nitrate (NaNO_{3}) and potassium nitrate (KNO_{3}). Salitre was an important source of export revenue for Chile until the early 1930s, when Europe began to produce both nitrates industrially in large quantities.

The deposits contain an average of 7.5% sodium nitrate, as well as sodium sulfate (18.87%), sodium chloride (4.8%), and smaller amounts of potassium, calcium, magnesium, borate, iodine, and perchlorate. About two-thirds of the deposits are insoluble gangue minerals. The caliche beds are from 2 cm to several meters thick in alluvial deposits, where the soluble minerals form a cement in unconsolidated regolith. Nitrate-bearing caliche is also found impregnating bedrock to form bedrock deposits.

Caliche is the main iodine ore in Chile and the country is the world's prime producer of this element in addition to hosting over half of the worlds reserves of iodine. SQM is Chile's main iodine producer. Iodine at SQM is extracted from caliche ore but requires also sulphur, ammonium nitrate, sulfuric acid, kerosene, water, electricity and fossil fuel, mainly diesel.

== Caliche and agriculture ==
Agriculture may not be compatible with caliche. First, an impermeable caliche layer prevents water from draining properly, which can keep roots from getting enough oxygen, and potentially cause salts to build up in the soil and turn it basic. Basic soil, along with calcium carbonate from the caliche, can prevent plants from getting enough nutrients, especially iron. An iron deficiency makes the youngest leaves turn yellow. Soil saturation above the caliche bed during wet spells can make the condition worse. Second, the impermeable nature of caliche beds impairs plant roots, limiting access to nutrients, water, and sound anchorage. Third, caliche's hardness can also make digging for irrigation projects such as canals more difficult.

== See also ==
- Coquina
- Travertine
