= Chalk heath =

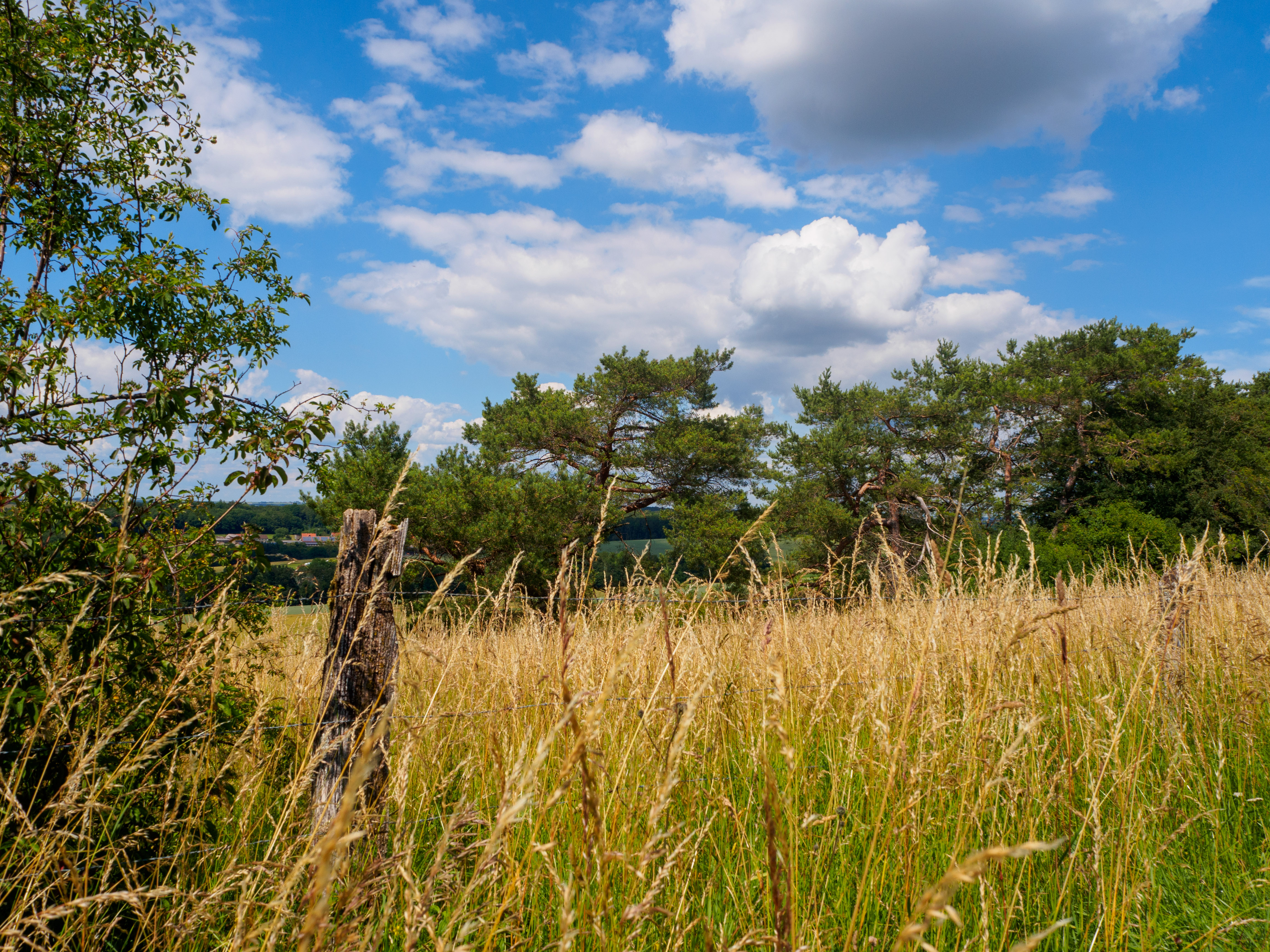
Chalk heath and Auf der Pottschütthöhe

Chalk heath is a rare habitat, in the temperate grasslands, savannas, and shrublands biome, formed of a paradoxical mixture of shallow-rooted calcifuge ("calcium-hating") and deeper-rooted calcicole ("calcium-loving") plants, growing on a thin layer of acidic soil over an alkaline substrate. Chalk heath is intermediate between two much more widespread habitats, chalk grassland and heathland.

== Ecology ==
Chalk heath occurs where a thin layer of acidic soil (often loess or sand) overlies a basic (alkaline) one, such as chalk. Shallow-rooted plants grow only in the acidic soil (typically a few centimetres thick), and so these are species characteristic of acidic habitats. Deeper-rooted plants can reach the underlying alkaline substrate, and so these include species characteristic of alkaline habitats. Plants also occur which are able to tolerate both acidic and basic conditions. There are no plants restricted entirely to chalk heath, and the animals are also those characteristic of chalk grassland and heathland. The vegetation structure of chalk heath resembles grass heath, being short grassy vegetation with heather growing up through it, with some scattered heather bushes.

Chalk heath often occurs at the tops of slopes, at the thin margins of acidic deposits which often cap the flatter tops of chalk hills. It usually gives way to chalk grassland on lower slopes where these deposits have been eroded away, and often to heathland on the hilltops where the acidic deposits are thicker. Chalk heath tends to occur as narrow strips and scattered fragments, being limited to places where the conditions are exactly right for its development and survival.

Chalk heath is a grazing habitat, created and maintained by livestock (usually sheep and cattle) and rabbits.

== Vegetation ==
Chalk heath in southern Britain includes calcicoles such as salad burnet (Sanguisorba minor), dropwort (Filipendula vulgaris) and common milkwort (Polygala vulgaris), and calcifuges such as bell heather (Erica cinerea), ling heather (Calluna vulgaris), heath grass (Danthonia decumbens), sheep's sorrel (Rumex acetosella) and betony (Stachys officinalis). It also includes plants which can tolerate both acidic and basic conditions, such as common bent (Agrostis capillaris), wood sage (Teucrium scorodonia) and sometimes juniper (Juniperus communis).

== Conservation ==
Chalk heath has suffered a parallel decline to those of heathland and chalk grassland, but because of the scattered and fragmented distribution of suitable soil conditions it has declined even more than those habitats. Many examples have disappeared due to agricultural improvement, or to a lack of grazing management, which leads to replacement by species-poor scrub and woodland. Chalk heath is especially sensitive to soil disturbance such as ploughing, which mixes the thin layer of acidic soil with the chalk beneath.

== Example locations ==
- Headley Heath in Surrey, England. Small areas of chalk heath surrounding a larger plateau of heathland.
- Lullington Heath in East Sussex, England. Relatively large areas of chalk heath with some chalk grassland.
- Kingley Vale National Nature Reserve, in West Sussex, England. Small areas of chalk heath at the top of a steep chalk escarpment.
- Porton Down, in Wiltshire, England. Chalk heath surrounded by extensive chalk grassland.

== See also ==
- Alvar
- Calcareous grassland
- Edaphic
- Gypcrust
- Gypsum flora of Nova Scotia
- Rendzina
