= Calcareous grassland =

Ecosystem associated with thin basic soil

Calcareous grassland (or alkaline grassland) is an ecosystem associated with thin basic soil, such as that on chalk and limestone downland.

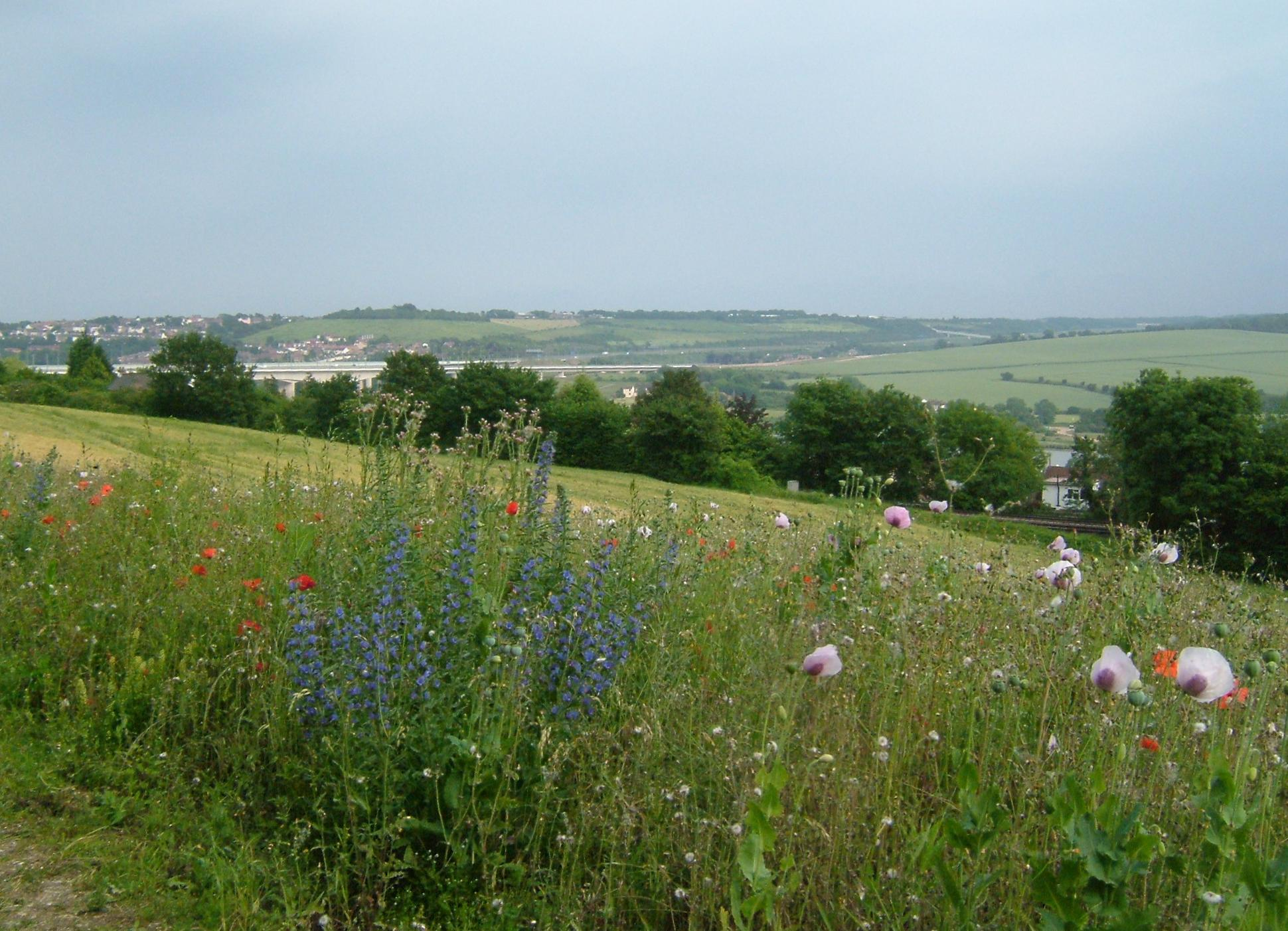
Ranscombe Farm, Medway on the North Downs. In June, these meadows are covered with chalk grassland flowers.

There are large areas of calcareous grassland in northwestern Europe, particularly areas of southern England, such as Salisbury Plain and the North and South Downs.

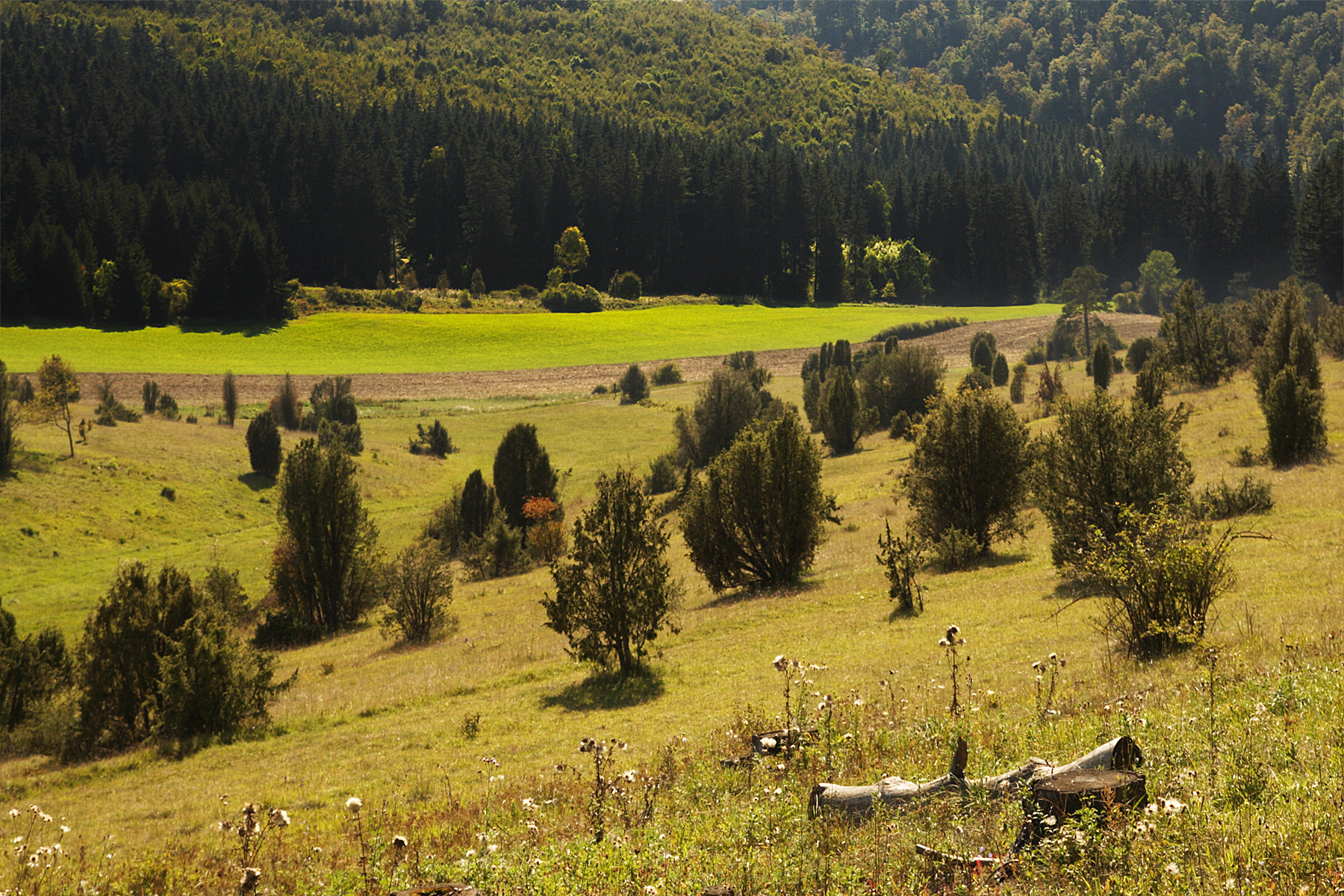
Wacholderheide, Swabian Alb, Naturschutzgebiet Digelfeld

The machair forms a different kind of calcareous grassland, where fertile low-lying plains are formed on ground that is calcium-rich due to shell sand (pulverised sea shells).

== Biodiversity ==
Plants on calcareous grassland are typically short and hardy, and include grasses and herbs such as clover. Calcareous grassland is an important habitat for insects, particularly butterflies and ants, and is kept at a plagioclimax by grazing animals, usually sheep and sometimes cattle. Rabbits used to play a part but due to the onset of myxomatosis their numbers decreased so dramatically that they no longer have much of a grazing effect.

The lichen flora of chalk grasslands represents an often overlooked component of calcareous grassland biodiversity. A comprehensive survey of English chalk grasslands in the 1990s identified two main lichen communities: the widespread Lecideetum watsomiae association found on chalk pebbles and flints, and the more restricted Fulgensietum fulgentis community. These lichen communities require specific conditions to grow, including areas of open ground created through natural or human disturbance, such as rabbit grazing, trampling, or historical agricultural practices. The richest lichen sites are often found where soil has been disturbed within the past century or where natural factors like landslips create suitable habitats. Key factors promoting lichen diversity include the presence of stable flints, areas of nutrient-poor soil, and the presence of a small loess (windblown silt) fraction in the soil. Characteristic species include Gyalolechia fulgens and various Cladonia species. Many calcareous grassland lichen communities have shown significant decline since the mid-20th century, attributed to factors such as reduced grazing, nitrogen deposition, and habitat loss.

== See also ==
- Alvar
- Chalk heath
- Edaphic
- Gypcrust
- Gypsum flora of Nova Scotia
- Rendzina
