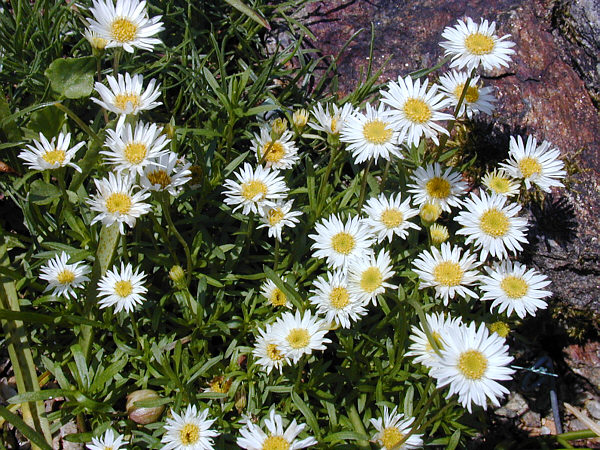

Scientific classification
- Kingdom: Plantae
- Clade: Tracheophytes
- Clade: Angiosperms
- Clade: Eudicots
- Clade: Asterids
- Order: Asterales
- Family: Asteraceae
- Genus: Erigeron
- Species: E. hyssopifolius

Binomial name
- Erigeron hyssopifolius Michx.

Synonyms
- Erigeron hyssopifolium Michx.

= Erigeron hyssopifolius =

Species of flowering plant

Erigeron hyssopifolius is a North American species of flowering plants in the family Asteraceae, called the hyssop-leaf fleabane. It is widespread across much of Canada and has also been found in the northeastern United States (northern New England, New York, Michigan).

Erigeron hyssopifolius is a perennial up to 35 centimeters (14 inches) tall, spreading by means of underground rhizomes. Each plant generally produces only one flower head, though sometimes groups of as many as 5, each head with up to 50 pink or white ray florets surrounding numerous yellow disc florets.
