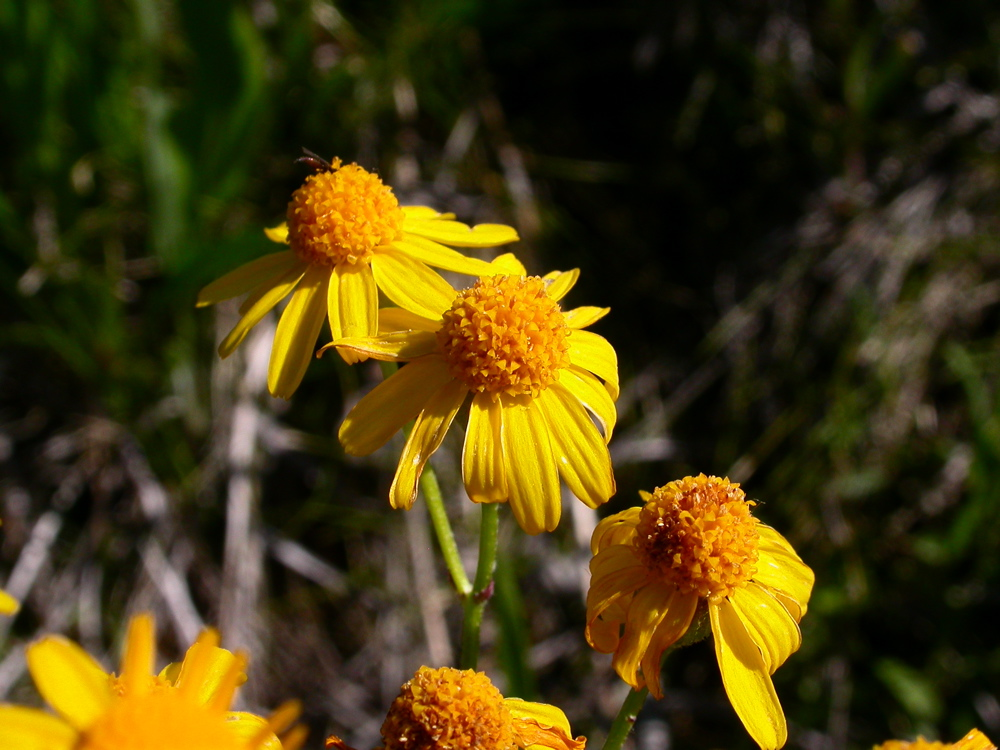

Conservation status
- Secure (NatureServe)

Scientific classification
- Kingdom: Plantae
- Clade: Tracheophytes
- Clade: Angiosperms
- Clade: Eudicots
- Clade: Asterids
- Order: Asterales
- Family: Asteraceae
- Genus: Packera
- Species: P. paupercula

Binomial name
- Packera paupercula (Michx.) Á.Löve & D.Löve

Synonyms
- Senecio pauperculus Michaux; Senecio balsamitae Muhlenberg ex Willdenow; Senecio crawfordii Britton; Senecio flavovirens Rydberg; Senecio gaspensis Greenman; Senecio multnomensis Greenman; Senecio tweedyi Rydberg

= Packera paupercula =

Species of flowering plant

Packera paupercula is a flowering plant species of the genus Packera and family Asteraceae, native to North America, where it is widespread across Canada and much of the United States. Its common names include balsam ragwort and balsam groundsel. It is a perennial herb that grows 1–3 feet (0.30–0.91 metres) tall. Its habitats include wet meadows, open woodlands, and rocky outcrops.

It flowers as early as April in the southern part of its range, and as late as August in the northern part of its range.

== Taxonomy ==
Packera paupercula taxonomically complex, with varying amounts of infraspecific taxa recognized by different authorities. No single classification to date has received wide acceptance. The Royal Botanic Gardens, Kew currently recognizes the following varieties:

- P. paupercula var. appalachiana - Restricted to the Appalachian Mountains
- P. paupercula var. paupercula - Widespread from Newfoundland to Alaska, south through the Rocky Mountains and Appalachians
- P. paupercula var. pseudotomentosa - Native to the Midwest, Upper South, and Ontario
- P. paupercula var. savannarum - Restricted to the upper Midwest
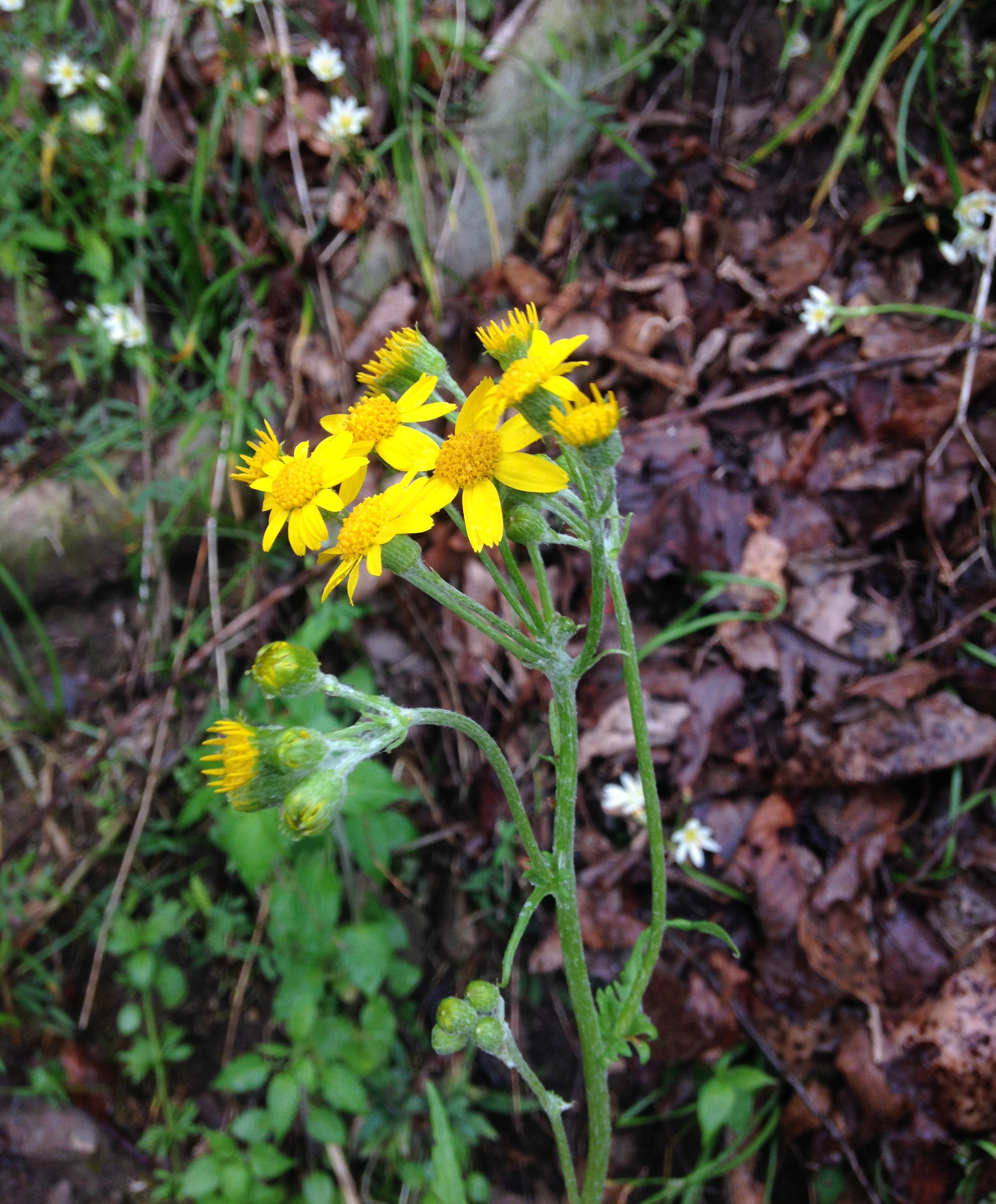
Variety pseduotomentosa is identified by its permanent tomentose pubescence and stoloniferous growth
