= List of listed buildings in Lyne, Scottish Borders =

This is a list of listed buildings in the parish of Lyne in the Scottish Borders, Scotland.

== List ==
Name	Location	Date Listed	Grid Ref. (Note: Sometimes known as OSGB36, the grid reference (where provided) is based on the British national grid reference system used by the Ordnance Survey. • "Guide to National Grid". Ordnance Survey. • "Get-a-map". Ordnance Survey.)	Geo-coordinates	Notes	LB Number (Note: Historic Environment Scotland assign a unique alphanumeric identifier to each designated site in Scotland, for listed buildings this always begins with "LB", for example "LB12345".)	Image
Five Mile Bridge				55°39′13″N 3°17′43″W	Category B	19742	Upload Photo
Lyne Parish Church				55°39′05″N 3°17′09″W	Category B	15357	Upload Photo
Hallyne House				55°39′06″N 3°17′06″W	Category B	13896	Upload Photo
The Beggar Path Bridge				55°39′04″N 3°16′15″W	Category B	15358	Upload Photo
Lynesmill Bridge				55°38′53″N 3°15′29″W	Category B	19741	Upload Photo

== Key ==
The scheme for classifying buildings in Scotland is:

- Category A: "buildings of national or international importance, either architectural or historic; or fine, little-altered examples of some particular period, style or building type."
- Category B: "buildings of regional or more than local importance; or major examples of some particular period, style or building type, which may have been altered."
- Category C: "buildings of local importance; lesser examples of any period, style, or building type, as originally constructed or moderately altered; and simple traditional buildings which group well with other listed buildings."

In March 2016 there were 47,288 listed buildings in Scotland. Of these, 8% were Category A, and 50% were Category B, with the remaining 42% being Category C.
