= Fivemile Creek (Altamaha River tributary) =

Stream in the United States

Coordinates: 31°49′36″N 82°02′54″W

Fivemile Creek is a stream in the U.S. state of Georgia. It is a tributary to the Altamaha River.

Fivemile Creek was so named for the fact is mouth is located 5 miles (8.0 km) from the Fort James Bluff. A variant name is "Five Mile Creek".
