= Fivemile Branch =

Stream in Georgia, US

Coordinates: 31°55′37.9″N 84°9′24.1″W

Fivemile Branch is a stream in the U.S. state of Georgia. It is a tributary to Muckalee Creek.

Fivemile Branch is about 5 miles (8 km) in length, hence the name. Variant names are "Five Mile Branch" and "Five Mile Creek".
