= Fivemile Creek (Wood County, Wisconsin) =

Stream in Wisconsin, U.S.

Coordinates: 44°19′22″N 89°50′03″W

Fivemile Creek is a stream in the U.S. state of Wisconsin.

Fivemile Creek was so named for its distance, five miles (8.0 km) from the original Grand Rapids townsite. The name sometimes is spelled out "Five Mile Creek".
