= Fivemile Creek (Youngs Creek tributary) =

Stream in the American state of Missouri

Coordinates: 39.3242069°N 91.9148910°W

Fivemile Creek is a stream in Audrain County in the U.S. state of Missouri. It is a tributary of Youngs Creek.

Fivemile Creek is about five miles (8.0 km) long, hence the name.

== See also ==
- List of rivers of Missouri
