= Gypsum =

Soft calcium sulfate mineral

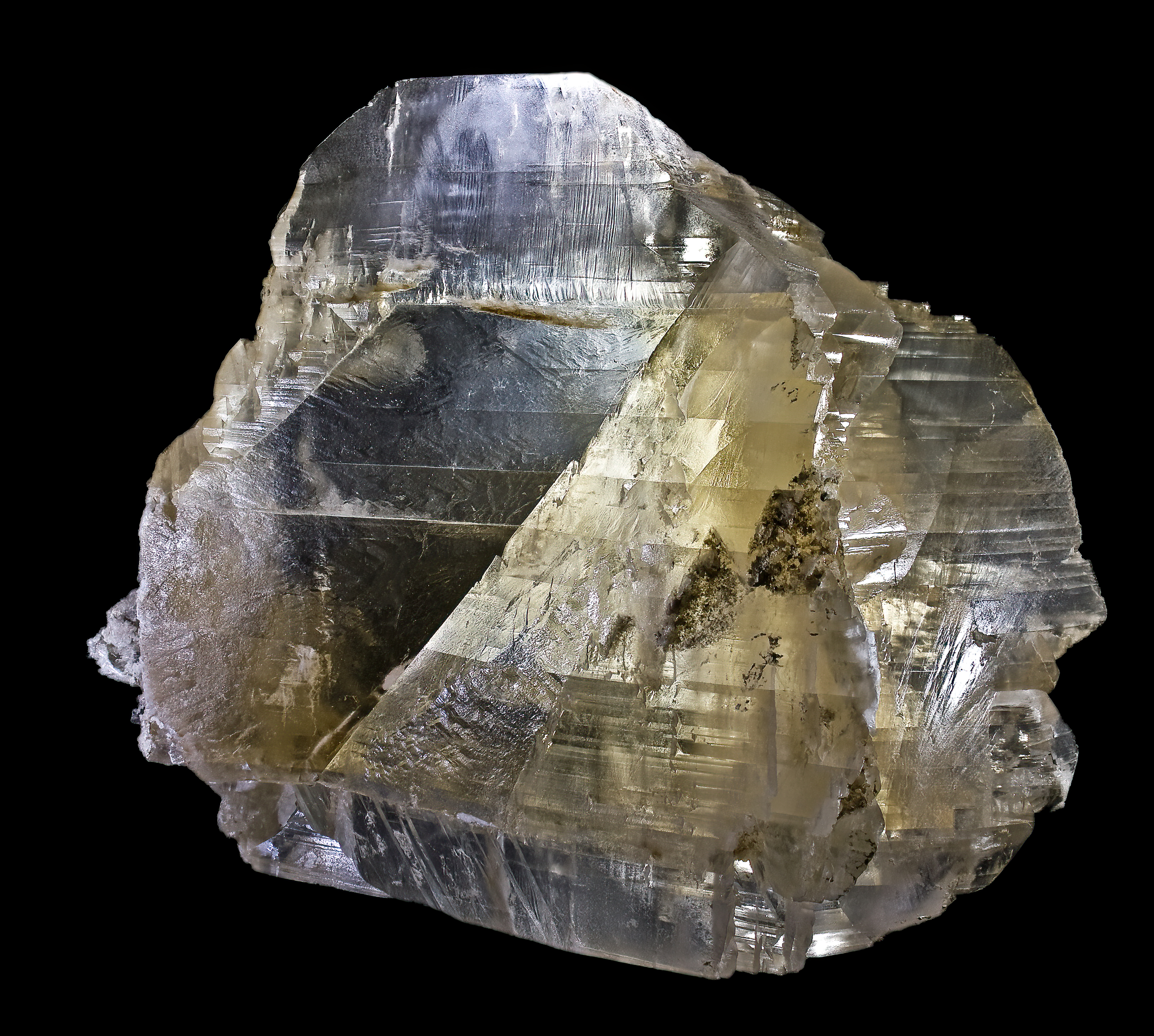
- Gypsum from southwest France (27 × 22 cm)

General
- Category: Sulfate minerals
- Formula: CaSO_{4}·2H_{2}O
- IMA symbol: Gp
- Strunz classification: 7.CD.40
- Crystal system: Monoclinic
- Crystal class: Prismatic (2/m); H-M symbol: (2/m)
- Space group: Monoclinic; Space group: I2/a
- Unit cell: a = 5.679(5), b = 15.202(14) c = 6.522(6) Å; β = 118.43°; Z = 4

Identification
- Color: Colorless (in transmitted light) to white; often tinged other hues due to impurities; may be yellow, tan, blue, pink, dark brown, reddish brown or gray
- Crystal habit: Massive, flat. Elongated and generally prismatic crystals
- Twinning: Very common on {110}
- Cleavage: Perfect on {010}, distinct on {100}
- Fracture: Conchoidal on {100}, splintery parallel to [001]
- Tenacity: Flexible, inelastic
- Mohs scale hardness: 1.5–2 (defining mineral for 2)
- Luster: Vitreous to silky, pearly, or waxy
- Streak: White
- Diaphaneity: Transparent to translucent
- Specific gravity: 2.31–2.33
- Optical properties: Biaxial (+)
- Refractive index: n_{α} = 1.519–1.521 n_{β} = 1.522–1.523 n_{γ} = 1.529–1.530
- Birefringence: δ = 0.010
- Pleochroism: None
- 2V angle: 58°
- Fusibility: 5
- Solubility: Hot, dilute HCl

Major varieties
- Satin spar: Pearly, fibrous masses
- Selenite: Transparent and bladed crystals
- Alabaster: Fine-grained, slightly colored

Gypsum is a soft sulfate mineral composed of calcium sulfate dihydrate, with the chemical formula CaSO_{4}·2H_{2}O. It is widely mined and is used as a fertilizer and as the main constituent in many forms of plaster, drywall and blackboard or sidewalk chalk. Gypsum also crystallizes as translucent crystals of selenite. It forms as an evaporite mineral and as a hydration product of anhydrite. The Mohs scale of mineral hardness defines gypsum as hardness value 2 based on scratch hardness comparison.

Fine-grained white or lightly tinted forms of gypsum known as alabaster have been used for sculpture by many cultures including Ancient Egypt, Mesopotamia, Ancient Etruscans, Ancient Rome, the Byzantine Empire, and the Nottingham alabasters of Medieval England.

== Etymology and history ==
The word gypsum is derived from the Greek word gypsos (γύψος), "plaster". Because the quarries of the Montmartre district of Paris have long furnished burnt gypsum (calcined gypsum) used for various purposes, this dehydrated gypsum became known as plaster of Paris. Upon adding water, after a few dozen minutes, plaster of Paris becomes regular gypsum (dihydrate) again, causing the material to harden or "set" in ways that are useful for casting and construction.

Gypsum was known in Old English as spærstān, "spear stone", referring to its crystalline projections. Thus, the word spar in mineralogy, by comparison to gypsum, refers to any non-ore mineral or crystal that forms in spearlike projections. In the mid-18th century, the German clergyman and agriculturalist Johann Friderich Mayer investigated and publicized gypsum's use as a fertilizer. Gypsum may act as a source of sulfur for plant growth, and in the early 19th century, it was regarded as an almost miraculous fertilizer. American farmers were so anxious to acquire it that a lively smuggling trade with Nova Scotia evolved, resulting in the so-called "Plaster War" of 1820.

== Physical properties ==
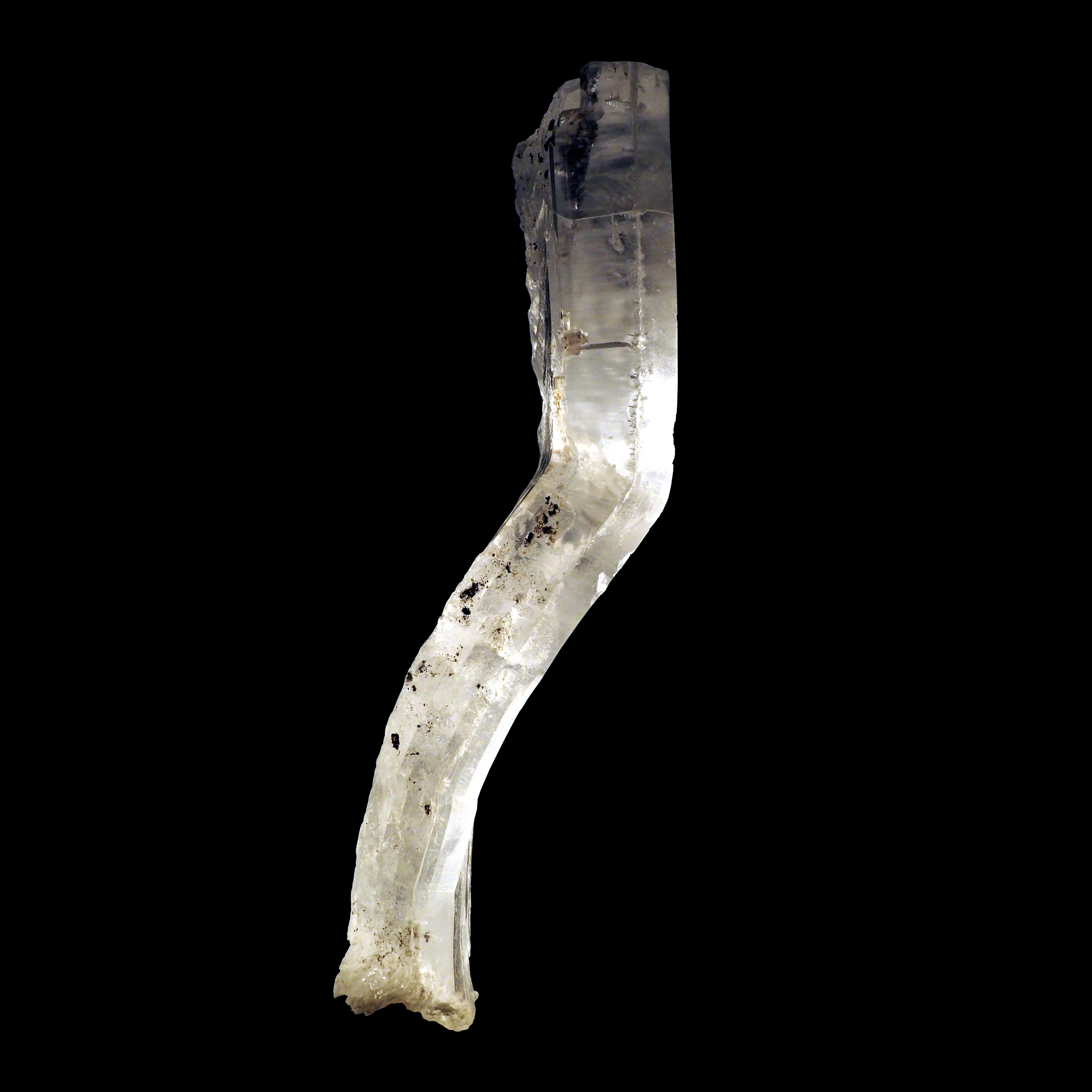
Gypsum crystals are soft enough to bend under pressure of the hand. Sample on display at Musée cantonal de géologie de Lausanne.

Gypsum is moderately water-soluble (~2.0–2.5 g/L at 25 °C) and, in contrast to most other salts, it exhibits retrograde solubility, becoming less soluble at higher temperatures. When gypsum is heated in air it loses water and converts first to calcium sulfate hemihydrate (bassanite, often simply called "plaster") and, if heated further, to anhydrous calcium sulfate (anhydrite). As with anhydrite, the solubility of gypsum in saline solutions and in brines is also strongly dependent on sodium chloride (common table salt) concentration.

The structure of gypsum consists of layers of calcium (Ca^{2+}) and sulfate (SO^{2−}_{4}) ions tightly bound together. These layers are bonded by sheets of water of crystallization via weaker hydrogen bonding, which gives the crystal perfect cleavage along the sheets (in the {010} plane).

== Crystal varieties ==
Gypsum occurs in nature as flattened and often twinned crystals, and transparent, cleavable masses called selenite. In the form of selenite, gypsum forms some of the largest crystals found in nature, up to 12 m (39 ft) long. Selenite contains no significant selenium; rather, both substances were named for the ancient Greek word for the Moon.

Selenite may also occur in a silky, fibrous form, in which case it is commonly called "satin spar".

It may also be granular or quite compact. In hand-sized samples, it can be anywhere from transparent to opaque.

A very fine-grained white or lightly tinted variety of gypsum, called alabaster, is prized for ornamental work of various sorts.

In arid areas, gypsum can occur in a flower-like form, typically opaque, with embedded sand grains called desert rose.

== Occurrence ==
Gypsum is a common mineral, with thick and extensive evaporite beds in association with sedimentary rocks. Deposits are known to occur in strata from as far back as the Archaean eon. Gypsum is deposited from lake and sea water, as well as in hot springs, from volcanic vapors, and sulfate solutions in veins. Hydrothermal anhydrite in veins is commonly hydrated to gypsum by groundwater in near-surface exposures. It is often associated with the minerals halite and sulfur. Gypsum is the most common sulfate mineral. Pure gypsum is white, but other substances found as impurities may give a wide range of colors to local deposits.

Because gypsum dissolves over time in water, gypsum is rarely found in the form of sand. However, the unique conditions of the White Sands National Park in the US state of New Mexico have created a 710 km^{2} (270 sq mi) expanse of white gypsum sand, enough to supply the US construction industry with drywall for 200 years. Commercial exploitation of the area, strongly opposed by area residents, was permanently prevented in 1933 when President Herbert Hoover declared the gypsum dunes a protected national monument.

Water solubility means Gypsum can form karst landscapes, for example the UNESCO World Heritage Site Evaporitic Karst and Caves of Northern Apennines in Italy is "an unusually well-preserved and extensive epigenic gypsum karst terrain".

Gypsum is also formed as a by-product of sulfide oxidation, amongst others by pyrite oxidation, when the sulfuric acid generated reacts with calcium carbonate. Its presence indicates oxidizing conditions. Under reducing conditions, the sulfates it contains can be reduced back to sulfide by sulfate-reducing bacteria. This can lead to accumulation of elemental sulfur in oil-bearing formations, such as salt domes, where it can be mined using the Frasch process Electric power stations burning coal with flue gas desulfurization produce large quantities of gypsum as a byproduct from the scrubbers.

Orbital pictures from the Mars Reconnaissance Orbiter (MRO) have indicated the existence of gypsum dunes in the northern polar region of Mars, which were later confirmed at ground level by the Mars Exploration Rover (MER) Opportunity.

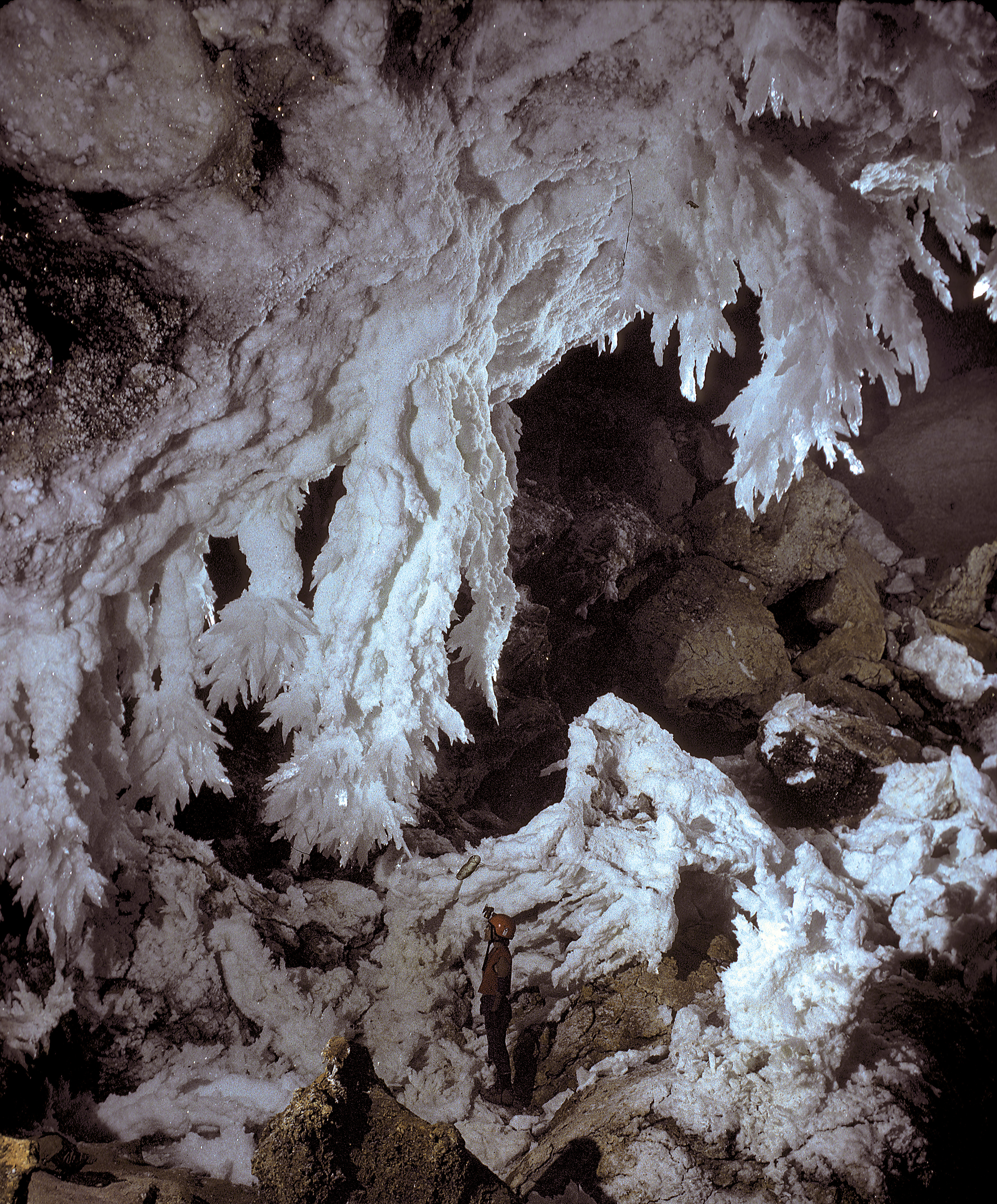
Large gypsum crystals in Lechuguilla Cave's "chandelier ballroom"

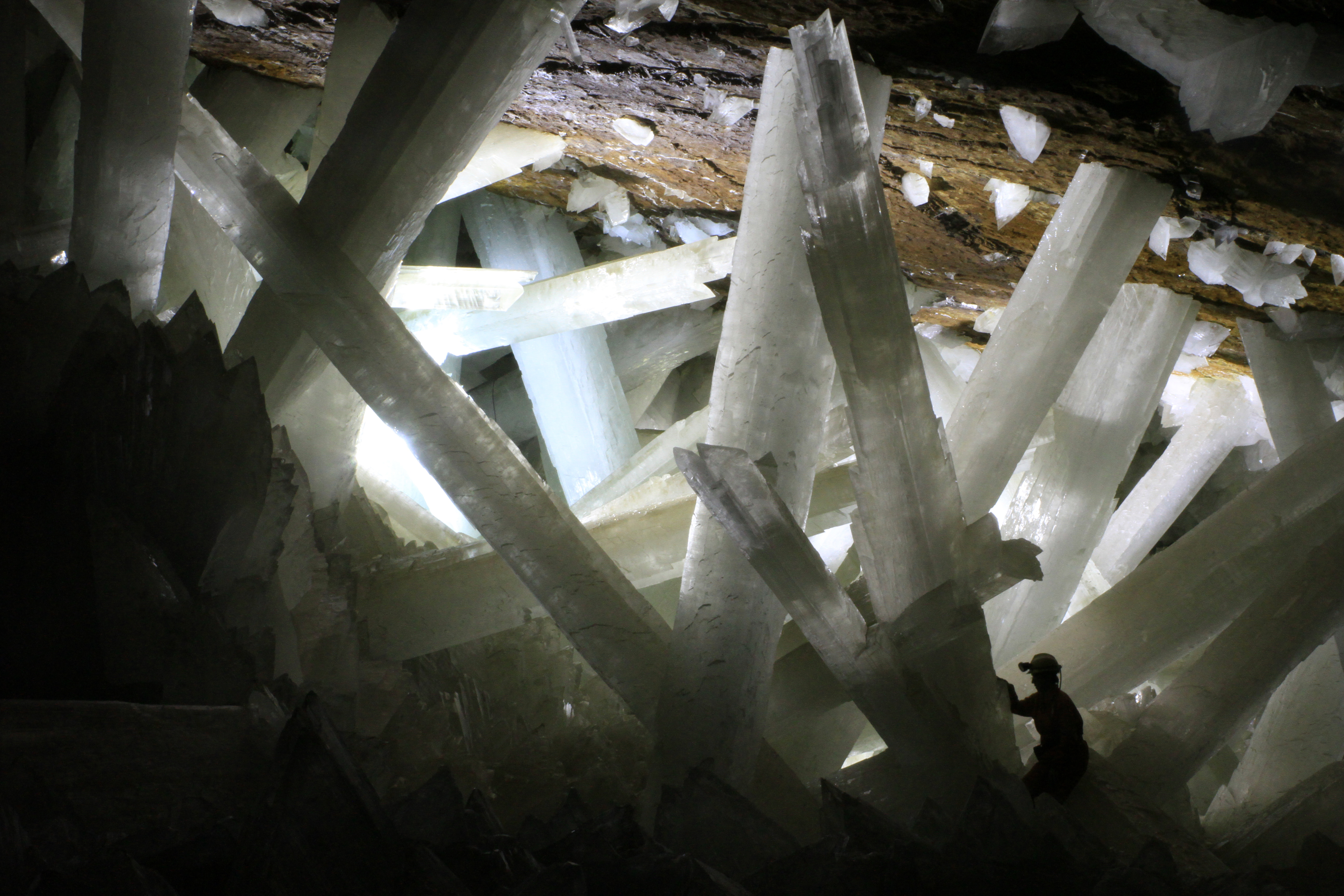
Gypsum crystals in the Cave of the Crystals in Mexico (person at lower right for scale)

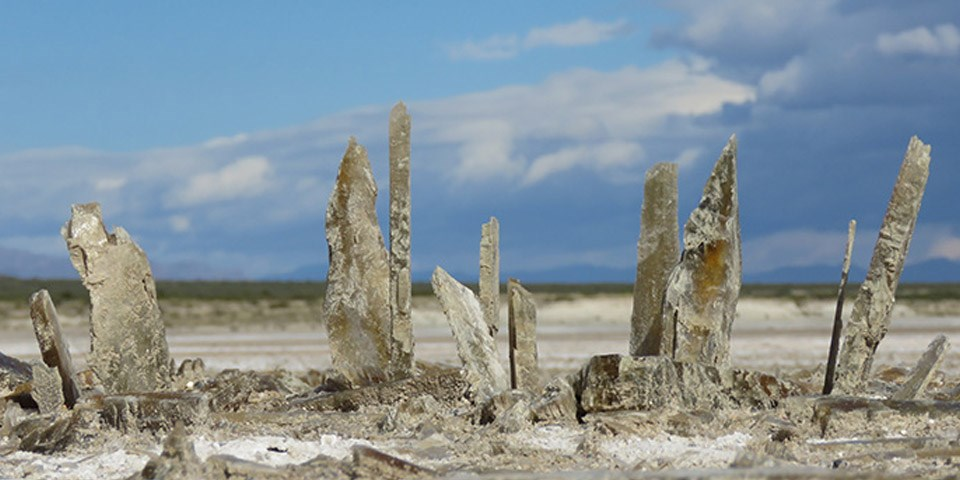
Gypsum crystals formed as the water evaporated in Lake Lucero, White Sands National Park

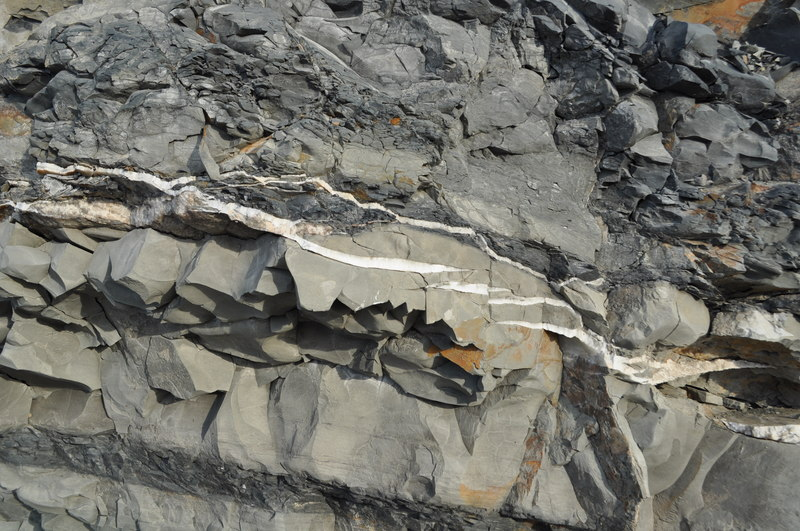
Gypsum veins in the silts/marls of the Tea Green and Grey Marls, Blue Anchor, Somerset, United Kingdom

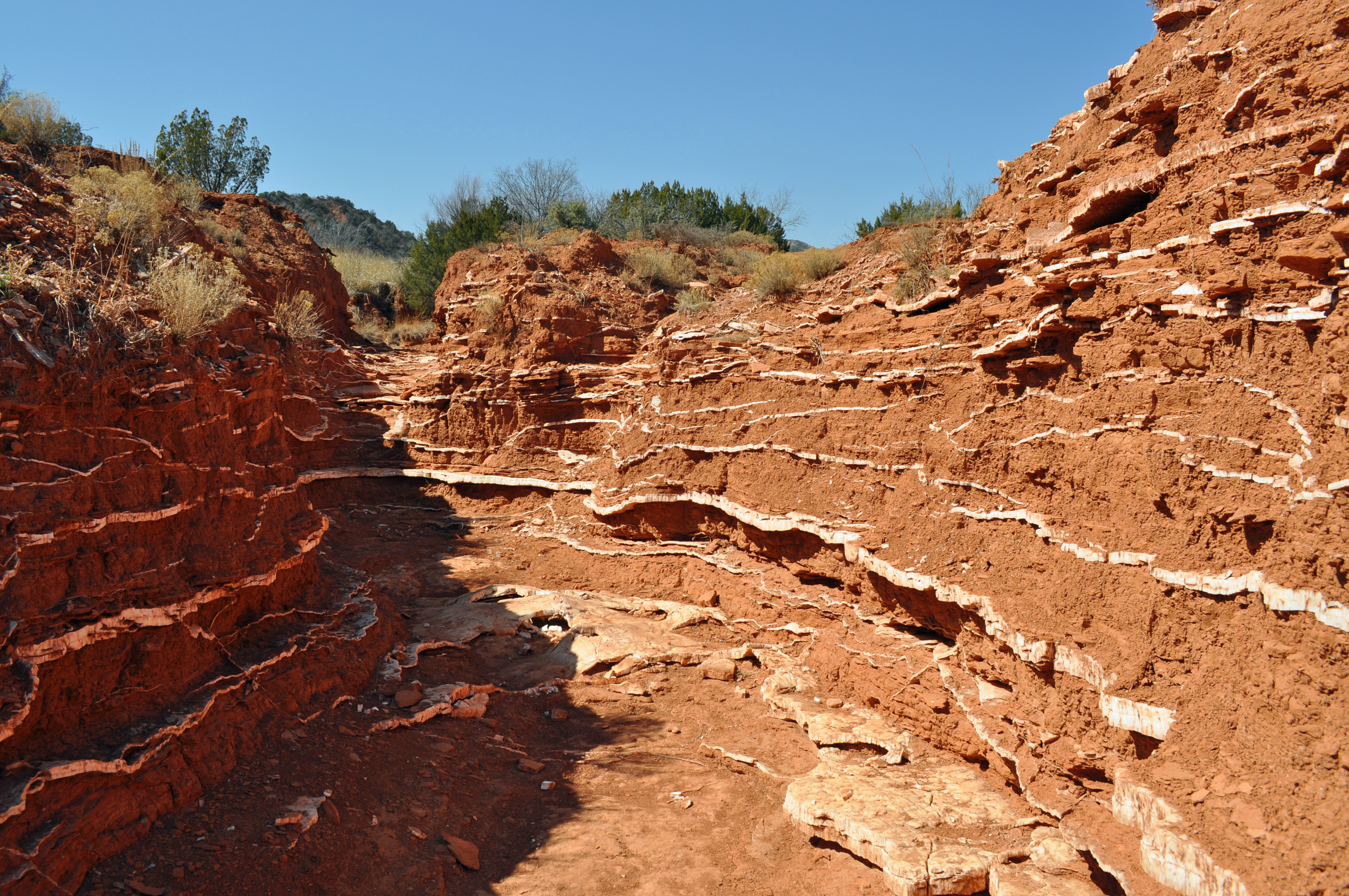
Gypsum veins in Caprock Canyons State Park and Trailway, Texas

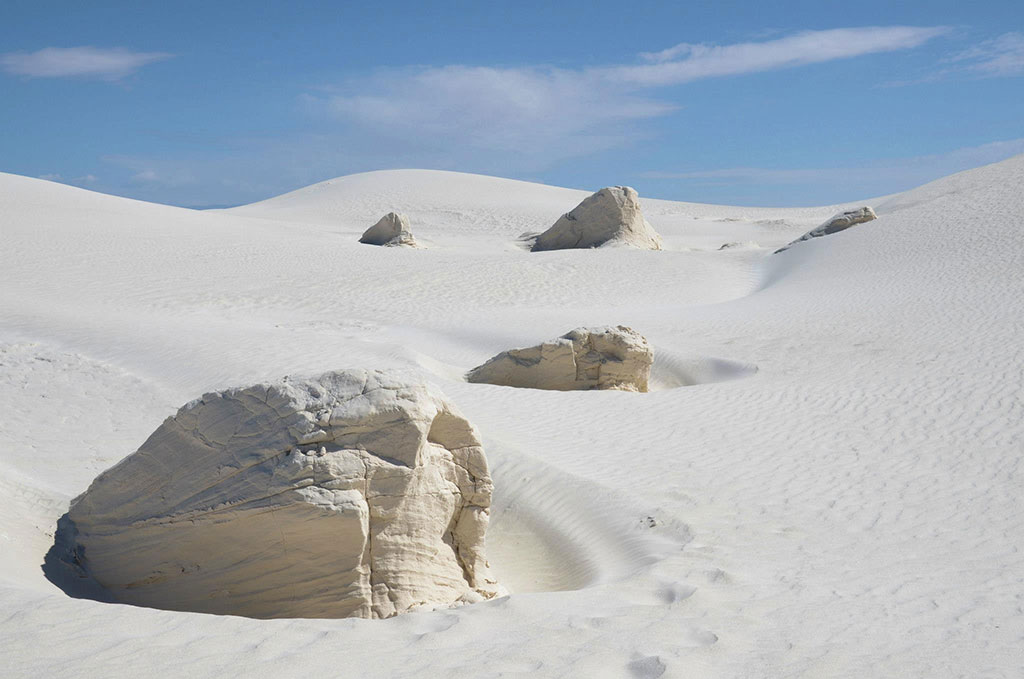
Dunes made of small crystals of gypsum, White Sands National Park

== Mining ==
Gypsum production

Estimated production of Gypsum in 2015 (thousand metric tons)
Country	Production	Reserves
China	132,000	—N/a
Iran	22,000	1,600
Thailand	12,500	—N/a
United States	11,500	700,000
Turkey	10,000	—N/a
Spain	6,400	—N/a
Mexico	5,300	—N/a
Japan	5,000	—N/a
Russia	4,500	—N/a
Italy	4,100	—N/a
India	3,500	39,000
Australia	3,500	—N/a
Oman	3,500	—N/a
Brazil	3,300	290,000
France	3,300	—N/a
Canada	2,700	450,000
Saudi Arabia	2,400	—N/a
Algeria	2,200	—N/a
Germany	1,800	450,000
Argentina	1,400	—N/a
Pakistan	1,300	—N/a
United Kingdom	1,200	55,000
Other countries	15,000	—N/a
World total	258,000	—N/a

Commercial quantities of gypsum are found in the cities of Araripina and Grajaú in Brazil; in Pakistan, Jamaica, Iran (world's second largest producer), Thailand, Spain (the main producer in Europe), Germany, Italy, England, Ireland, Canada and the United States. Large open pit quarries are located in many places including Fort Dodge, Iowa, which sits on one of the largest deposits of gypsum in the world, and Plaster City, California, United States, and East Kutai, Kalimantan, Indonesia. Several small mines also exist in places such as Kalannie in Western Australia, where gypsum is sold to private buyers for additions of calcium and sulfur as well as reduction of aluminium toxicities on soil for agricultural purposes.

Crystals of gypsum up to 11 m (36 ft) long have been found in the caves of the Naica Mine of Chihuahua, Mexico. The crystals thrived in the cave's extremely rare and stable natural environment. Temperatures stayed at 58 °C (136 °F), and the cave was filled with mineral-rich water that drove the crystals' growth. The largest of those crystals weighs 55 tonnes (61 short tons) and is around 500,000 years old.

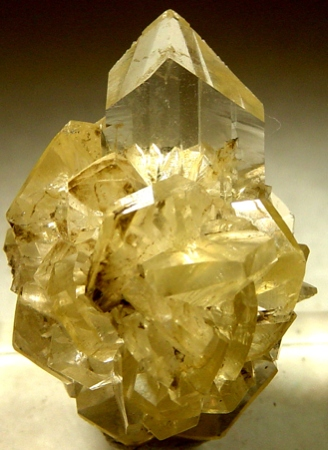
Golden gypsum crystals from Winnipeg

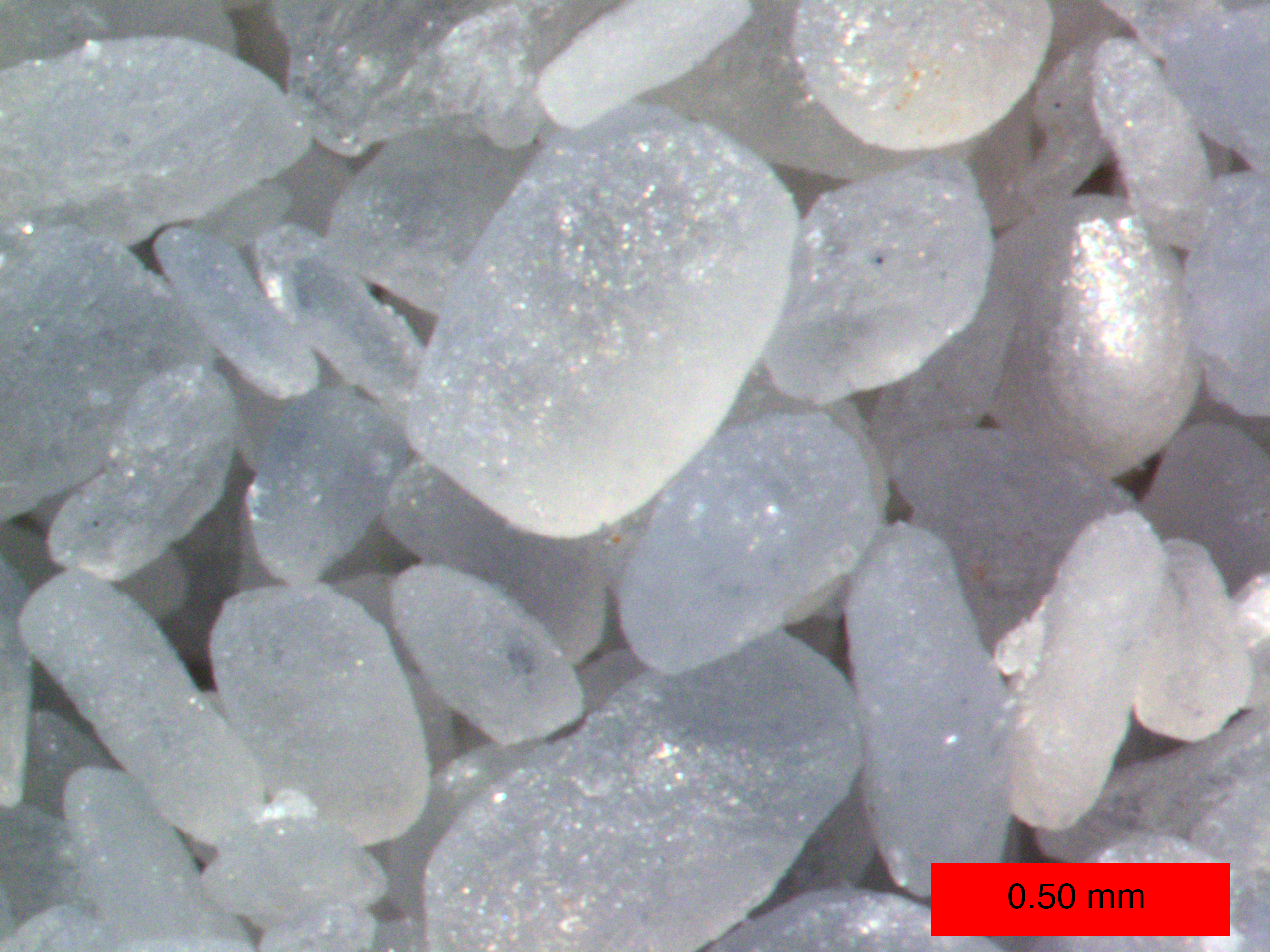
Gypsum sand from White Sands National Park, New Mexico

== Synthesis ==
Synthetic gypsum is produced as a waste product or by-product in a range of industrial processes.

=== Desulfurization ===
Flue gas desulfurization gypsum (FGDG) is recovered at some coal-fired power plants. The main contaminants are Mg, K, Cl, F, B, Al, Fe, Si, and Se. They come both from the limestone used in desulfurization and from the coal burned. This product is pure enough to replace natural gypsum in a wide variety of fields including drywalls, water treatment, and cement set retarder. Improvements in flue gas desulfurization have greatly reduced the amount of toxic elements present.

=== Desalination ===
Gypsum precipitates onto brackish water membranes, a phenomenon known as mineral salt scaling, such as during brackish water desalination of water with high concentrations of calcium and sulfate. Scaling decreases membrane life and productivity. This is one of the main obstacles in brackish water membrane desalination processes, such as reverse osmosis or nanofiltration. Other forms of scaling, such as calcite scaling, depending on the water source, can also be important considerations in distillation, as well as in heat exchangers, where either the salt solubility or concentration can change rapidly.

A new study has suggested that the formation of gypsum starts as tiny crystals of a mineral called bassanite (2CaSO_{4}·H_{2}O). This process occurs via a three-stage pathway:

1. homogeneous nucleation of nanocrystalline bassanite;
2. self-assembly of bassanite into aggregates, and
3. transformation of bassanite into gypsum.

=== Refinery waste ===
The production of phosphate fertilizers requires breaking down calcium-containing phosphate rock with acid, producing calcium sulfate waste known as phosphogypsum (PG). This form of gypsum is contaminated by impurities found in the rock, namely fluoride, silica, radioactive elements such as radium, and heavy metal elements such as cadmium. Similarly, production of titanium dioxide produces titanium gypsum (TG) due to neutralization of excess acid with lime. The product is contaminated with silica, fluorides, organic matters, and alkalis.

Impurities in refinery gypsum waste have, in many cases, prevented them from being used as normal gypsum in fields such as construction. As a result, waste gypsum is stored in stacks indefinitely, with significant risk of leaching their contaminants into water and soil. To reduce the accumulation and ultimately clear out these stacks, research is underway to find more applications for such waste products.

== Occupational safety ==
NFPA 704 safety square
- 0 0 0 Gypsum

People can be exposed to gypsum in the workplace by breathing it in, skin contact, and eye contact. Calcium sulfate per se is nontoxic and is even approved as a food additive, but as powdered gypsum, it can irritate skin and mucous membranes.

=== United States ===
The Occupational Safety and Health Administration (OSHA) has set the legal limit (permissible exposure limit) for gypsum exposure in the workplace as TWA 15 mg/m^{3} for total exposure and TWA 5 mg/m^{3} for respiratory exposure over an eight-hour workday. The National Institute for Occupational Safety and Health (NIOSH) has set a recommended exposure limit (REL) of TWA 10 mg/m^{3} for total exposure and TWA 5 mg/m^{3} for respiratory exposure over an eight-hour workday.

== Uses ==
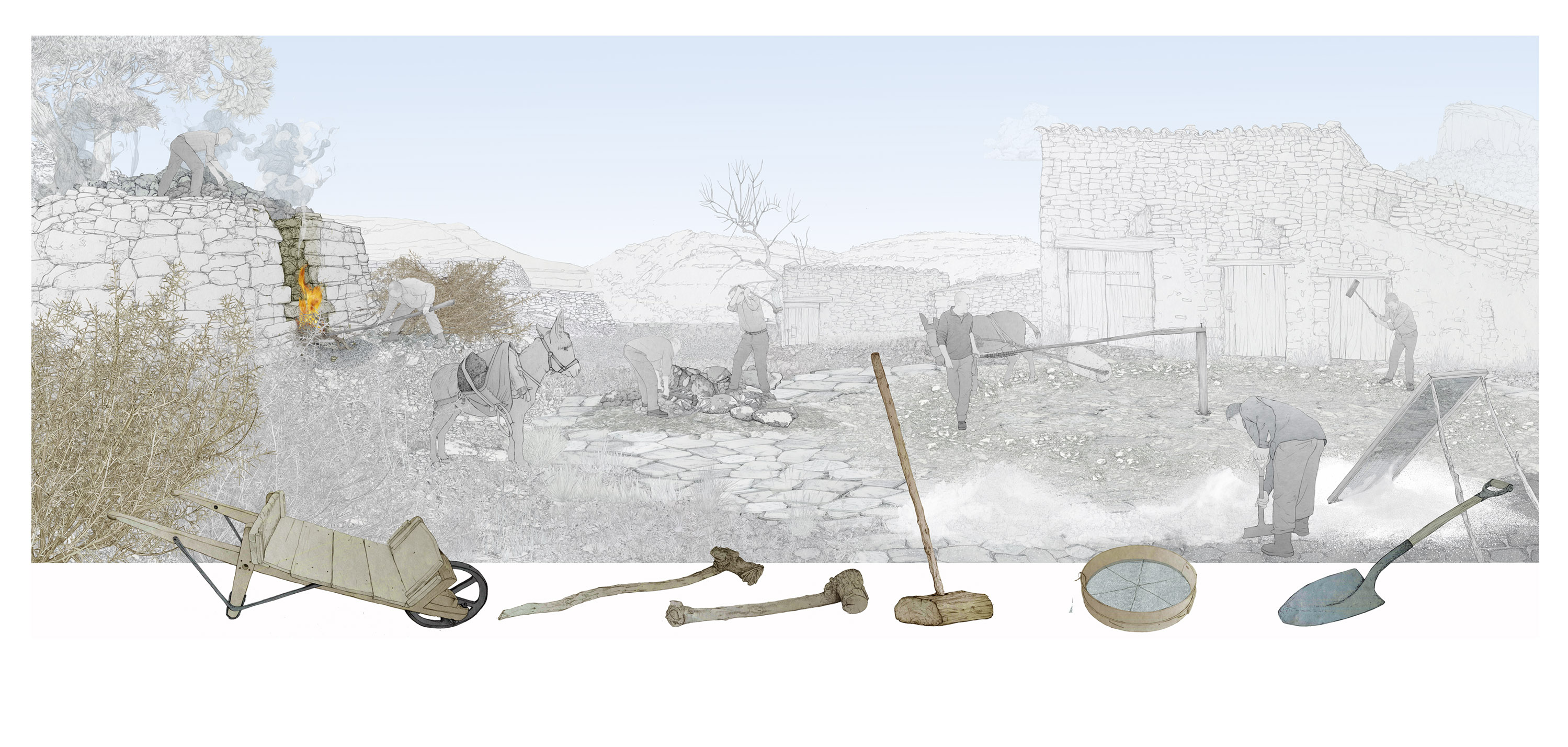
Gypsum works, Valencian Museum of Ethnology

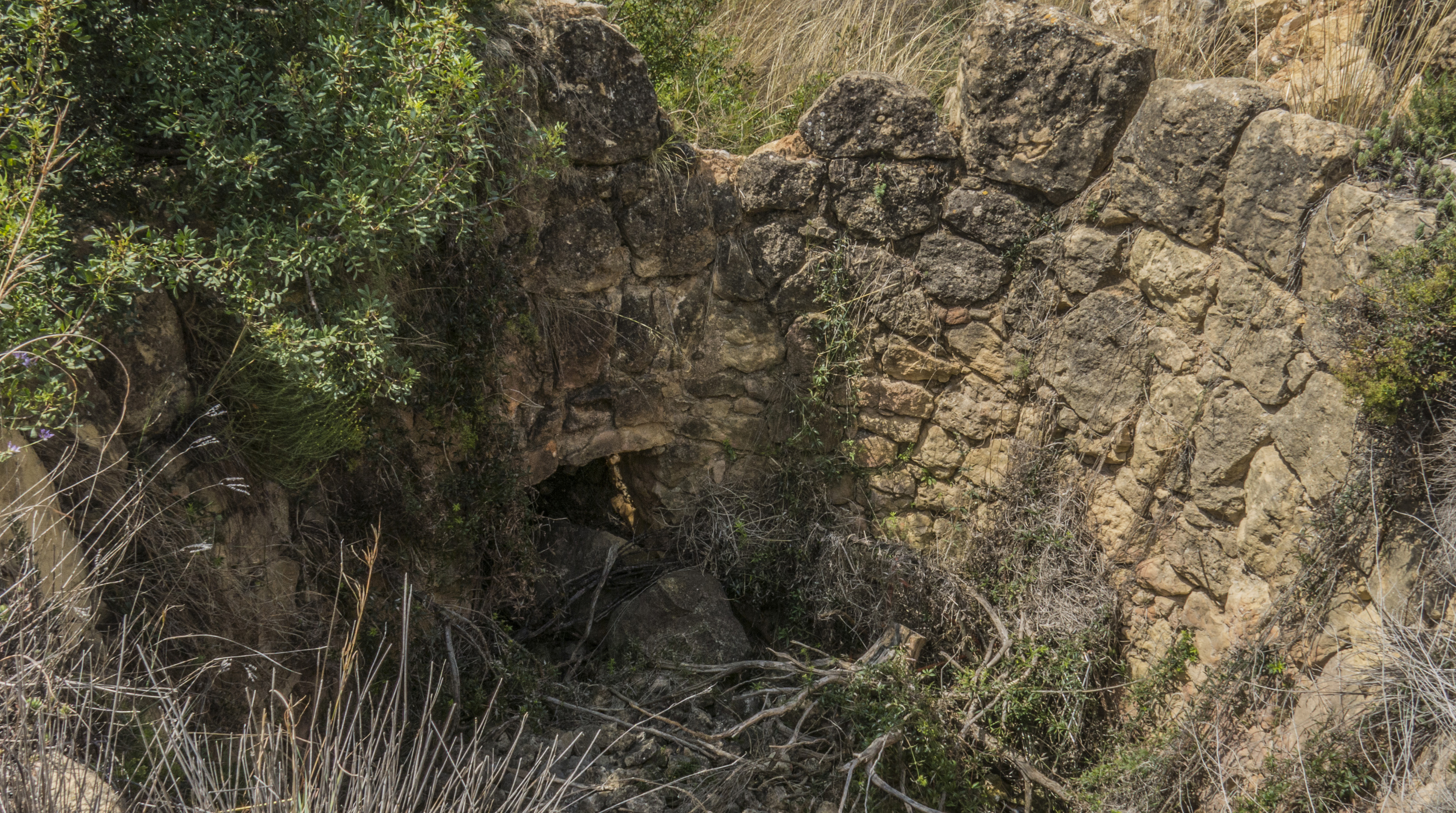
Old Alfarb kiln for making plaster as a construction material

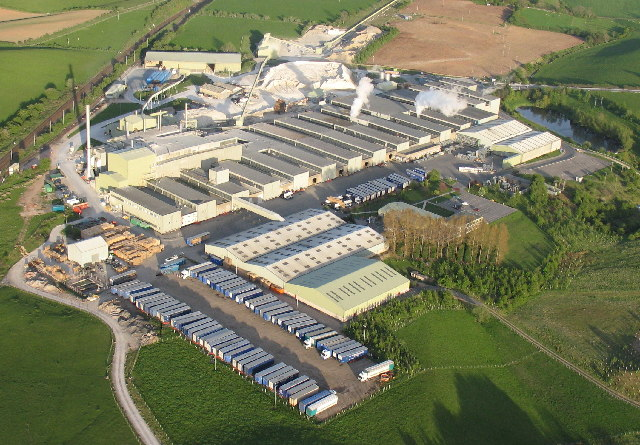
British Gypsum, Kirkby Thore

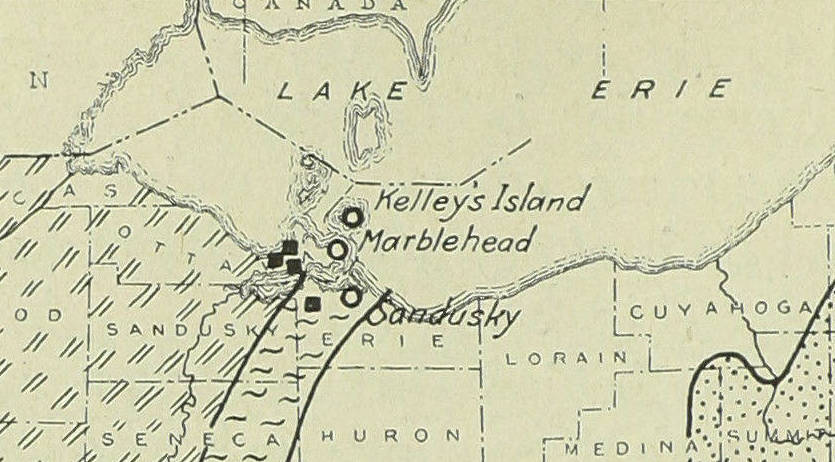
Map of gypsum deposits in northern Ohio, black squares indicate the location of deposits, from "Geography of Ohio", 1923

Gypsum is used in a wide variety of applications:

=== Construction industry ===
- Gypsum board is primarily used as a finish for walls and ceilings, and is known in construction as plasterboard, "sheetrock", or drywall. Gypsum provides a degree of fire-resistance to these materials, and glass fibers are added to their composition to accentuate this effect. Gypsum has negligible heat conductivity, giving its plaster some insulative properties.
- Gypsum blocks are used like concrete blocks in construction.
- Gypsum mortar is an ancient mortar used in construction.
- A component of Portland cement used to prevent flash setting (too rapid hardening) of concrete.
- A wood substitute in the ancient world: For example, when wood became scarce due to deforestation on Bronze Age Crete, gypsum was employed in building construction at locations where wood was previously used.

=== Agriculture ===
- Fertilizer: In the late 18th and early 19th centuries, Nova Scotia gypsum, often referred to as plaster, was a highly sought fertilizer for wheat fields in the United States. Gypsum provides two of the secondary plant macronutrients, calcium and sulfur. Unlike limestone, it generally does not affect soil pH.
- Reclamation of saline soils, regardless of pH. When gypsum is added to sodic (saline) and acidic soil, the highly soluble form of boron (sodium metaborate) is converted to the less soluble calcium metaborate. The exchangeable sodium percentage is also reduced by gypsum application. The Zuiderzee Works uses gypsum for the recovered land.
- Other soil conditioner uses: Gypsum reduces aluminium and boron toxicity in acidic soils. It also improves soil structure, water absorption, and aeration.
- Soil water potential monitoring: a gypsum block can be inserted into the soil, and its electrical resistance can be measured to derive soil moisture.

=== Modeling, sculpture and art ===
- Plaster for casting moulds and modeling.
- As alabaster, a material for sculpture, it was used especially in the ancient world before steel was developed, when its relative softness made it much easier to carve. During the Middle Ages and Renaissance, it was preferred even to marble.
- In the medieval period, scribes and illuminators used it as an ingredient in gesso, which was applied to illuminated letters and gilded with gold in illuminated manuscripts.

=== Food and drink ===
- A tofu (soy bean curd) coagulant, making it ultimately a significant source of dietary calcium.
- Adding hardness to water used for brewing.
- Used in baking as a dough conditioner, reducing stickiness, and as a baked goods source of dietary calcium. The primary component of mineral yeast food.
- Used in mushroom cultivation to stop grains from clumping together.

=== Medicine and cosmetics ===
- Plaster for surgical splints.
- Impression plasters in dentistry.

=== Other ===
- An alternative to iron oxide in some thermite mixes.
- Tests have shown that gypsum can be used to remove pollutants such as lead or arsenic from contaminated waters.

== Gallery ==
Gypsum specimens from around the world

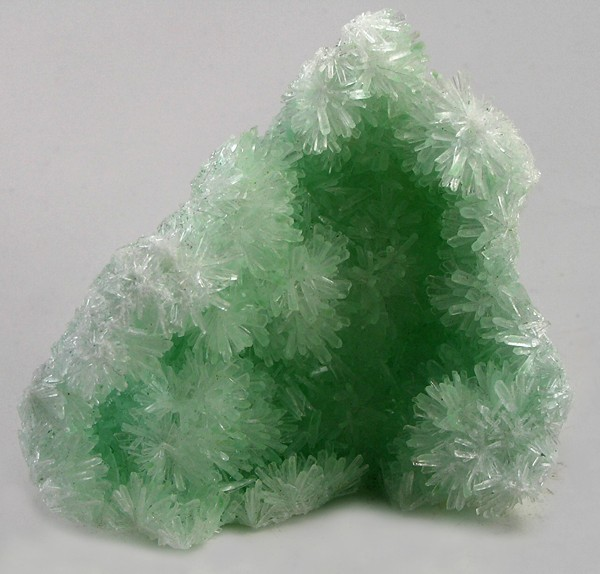
Green gypsum crystals from Pernatty Lagoon, Mt Gunson, South Australia - its green color is due to presence of copper ions

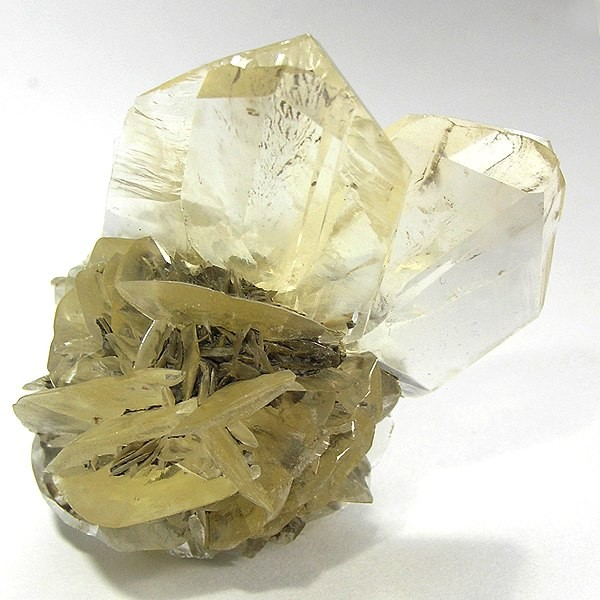
Unusual selenite gypsum from the Red River, Winnipeg, Canada

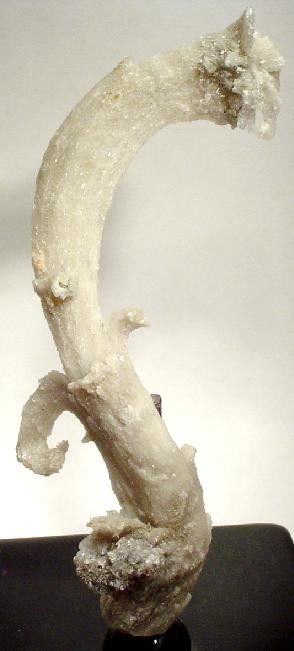
Classic "ram's horn" gypsum from Santa Eulalia, Chihuahua, Mexico, 7.5×4.3×3.8 cm

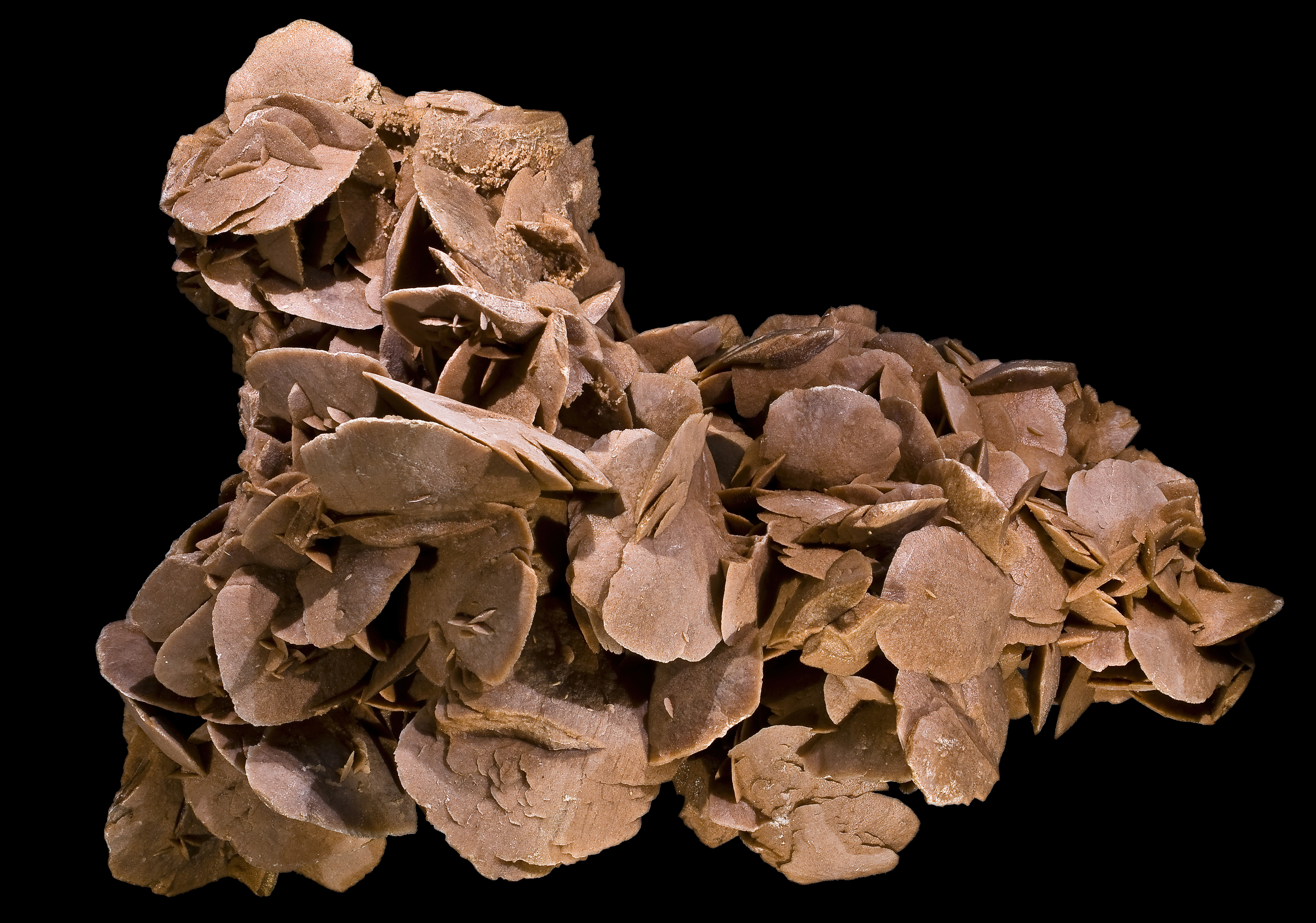
Desert rose, 47 cm long

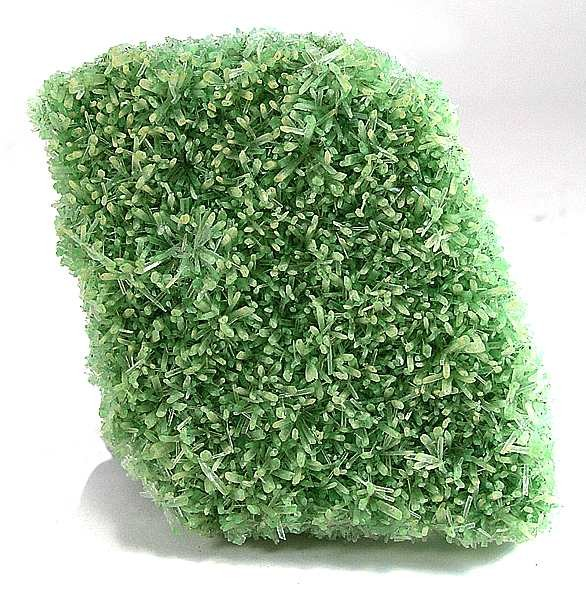
Gypsum from Pernatty Lagoon, Mt Gunson, Stuart Shelf area, Andamooka Ranges - Lake Torrens area, South Australia

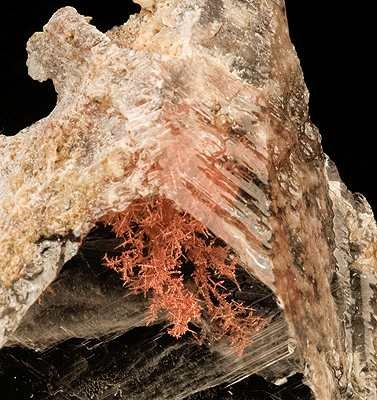
Gypsum with crystalline native copper inside

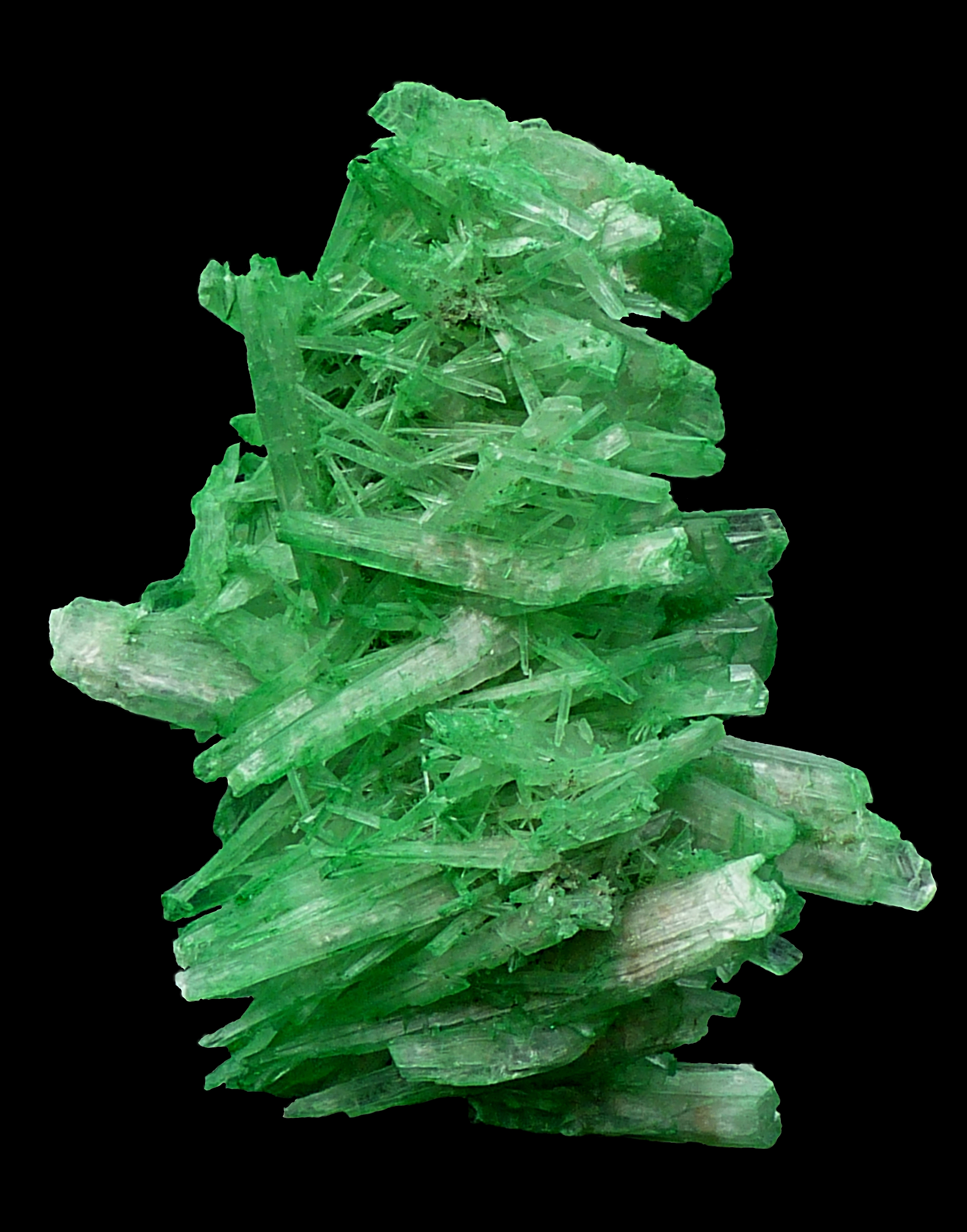
Gypsum from Swan Hill, Victoria, Australia. The coloring is due to the copper oxide

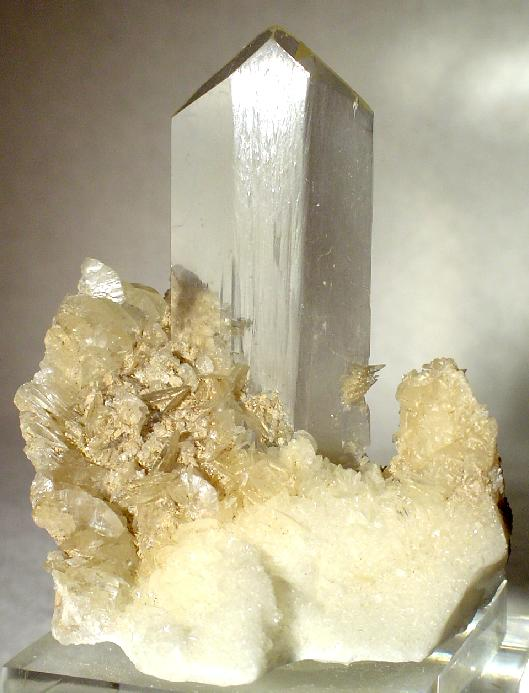
Waterclear twined crystal of the form known as "Roman sword". Fuentes de Ebro, Zaragoza (Spain)

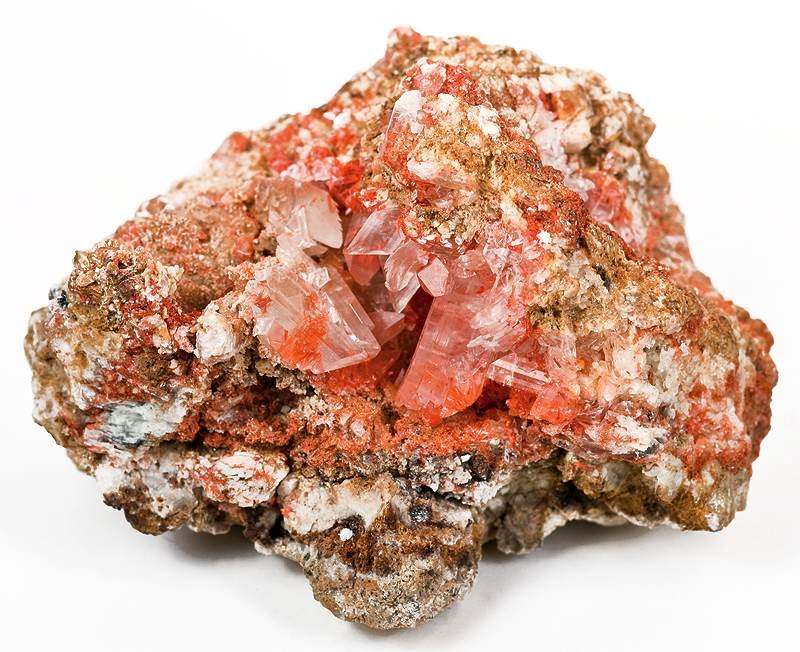
Bright, cherry-red gypsum crystals 2.5 cm in height colored by rich inclusions of the rare mineral botryogen

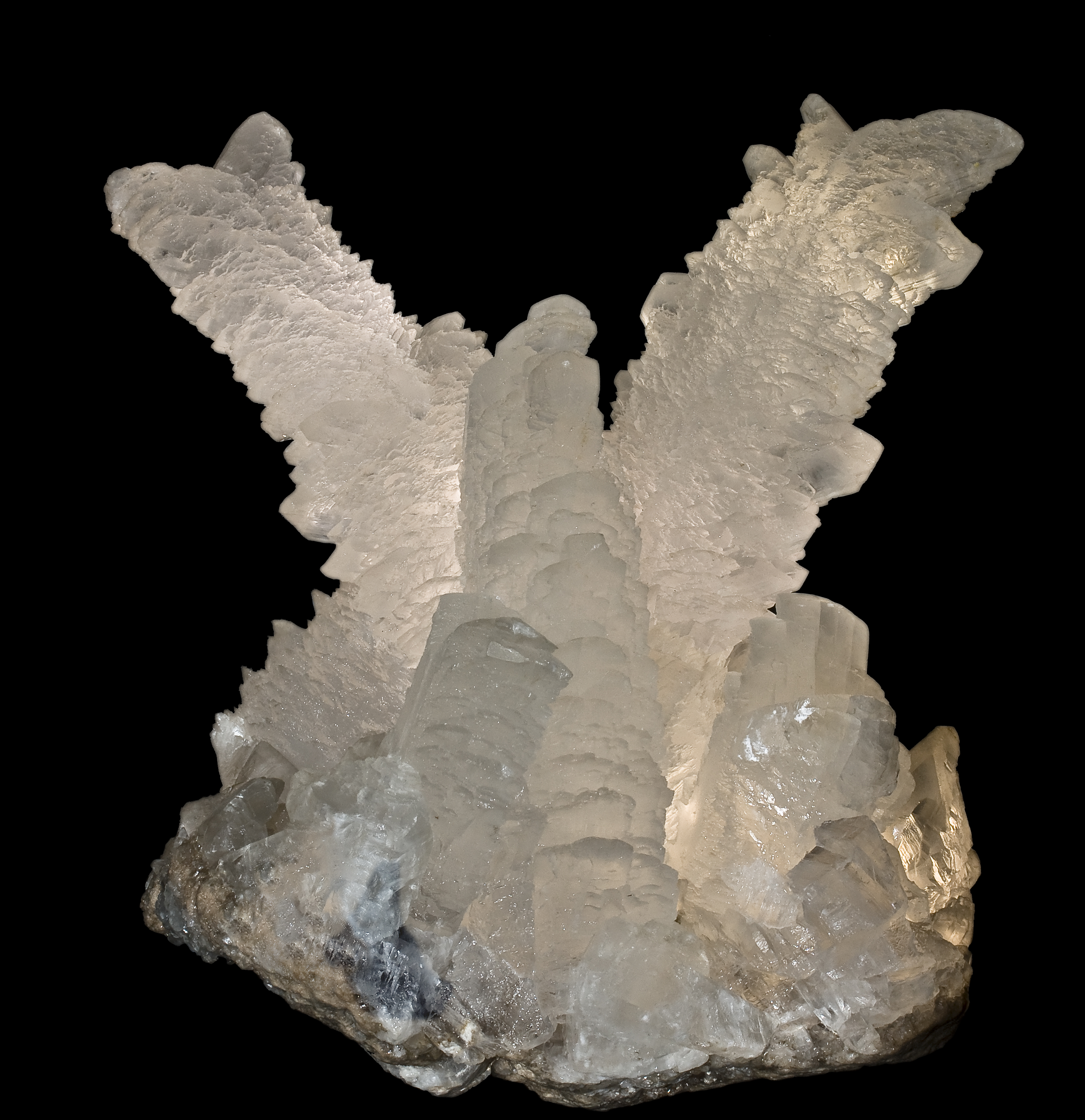
Gypsum from Naica, Mun. de Saucillo, Chihuahua, Mexico

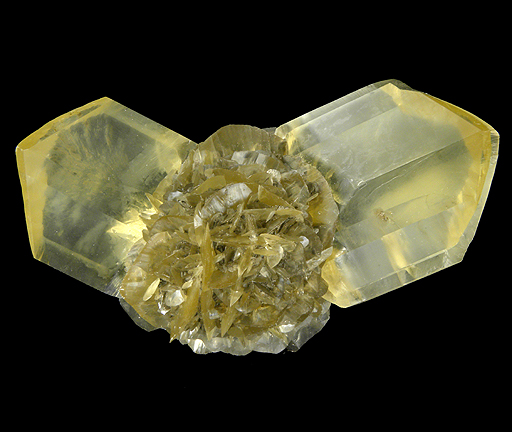
Golden color gem, "fishtail"-twinned crystals of gypsum sitting atop a "ball" of gypsum which is composed of several single bladed crystals

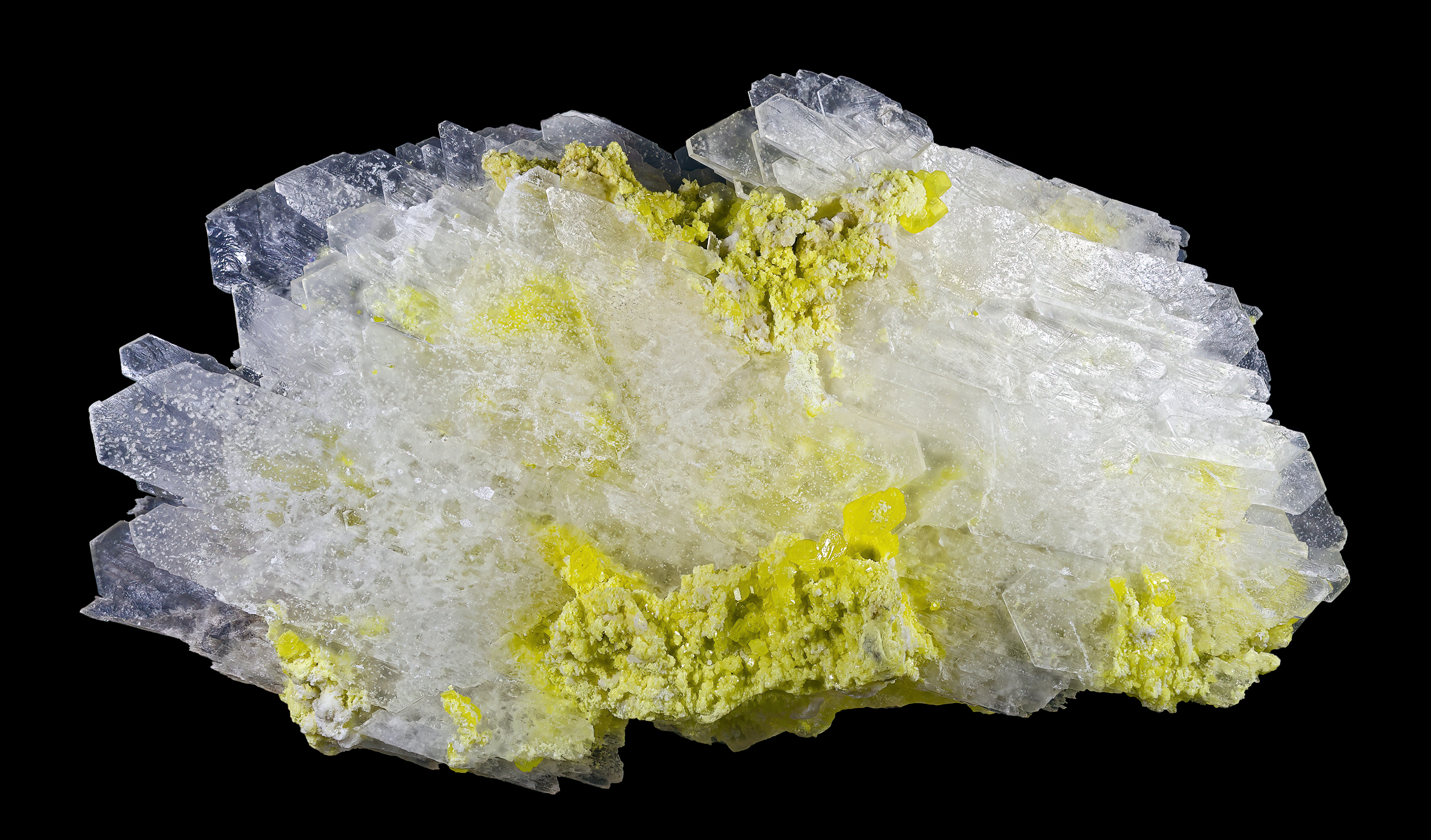
Gypsum and native sulfur, Cianciana, Sicily, Italy

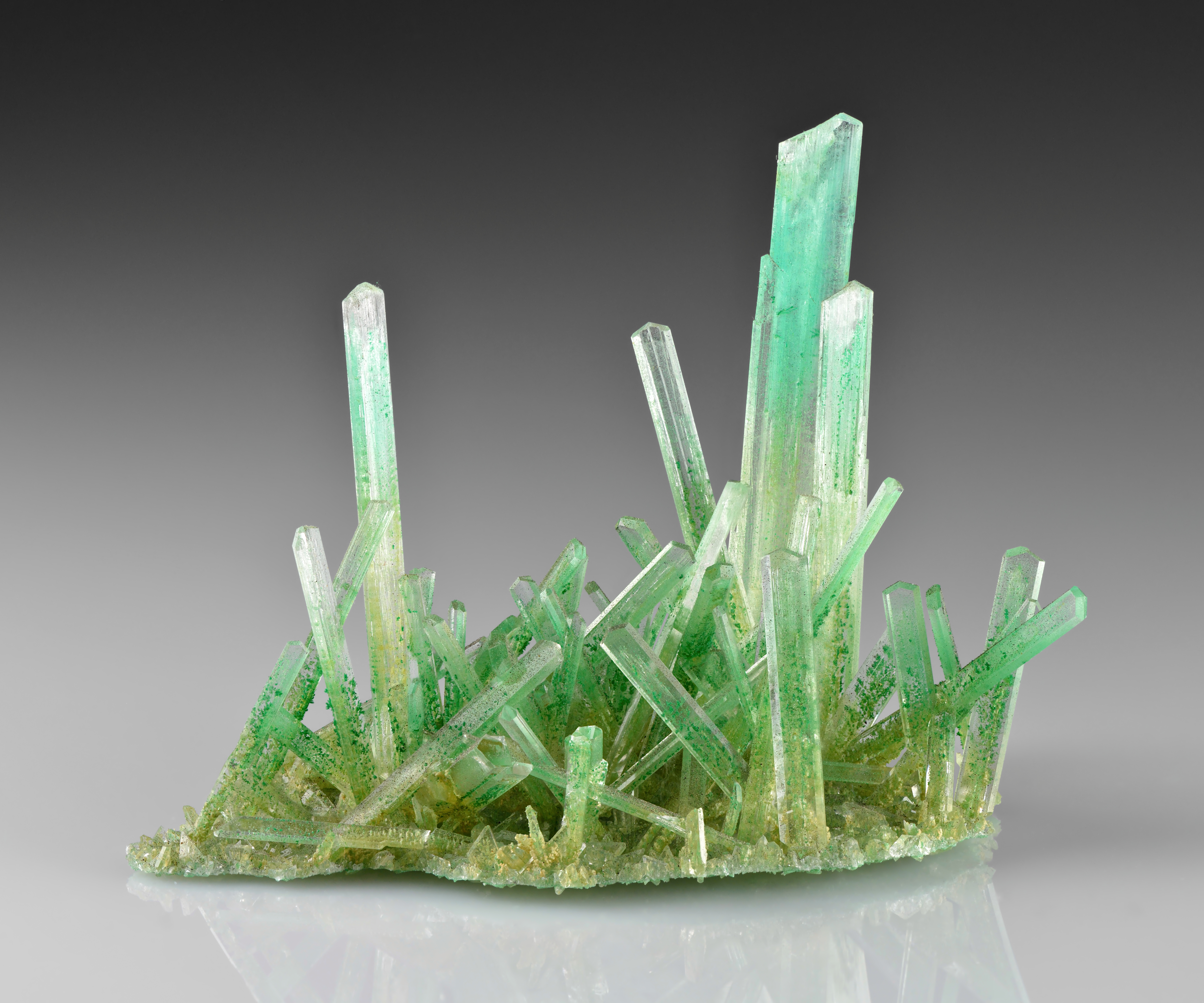
Partly transparent gypsum crystals with green herbertsmithite inclusions from Lubin, Poland

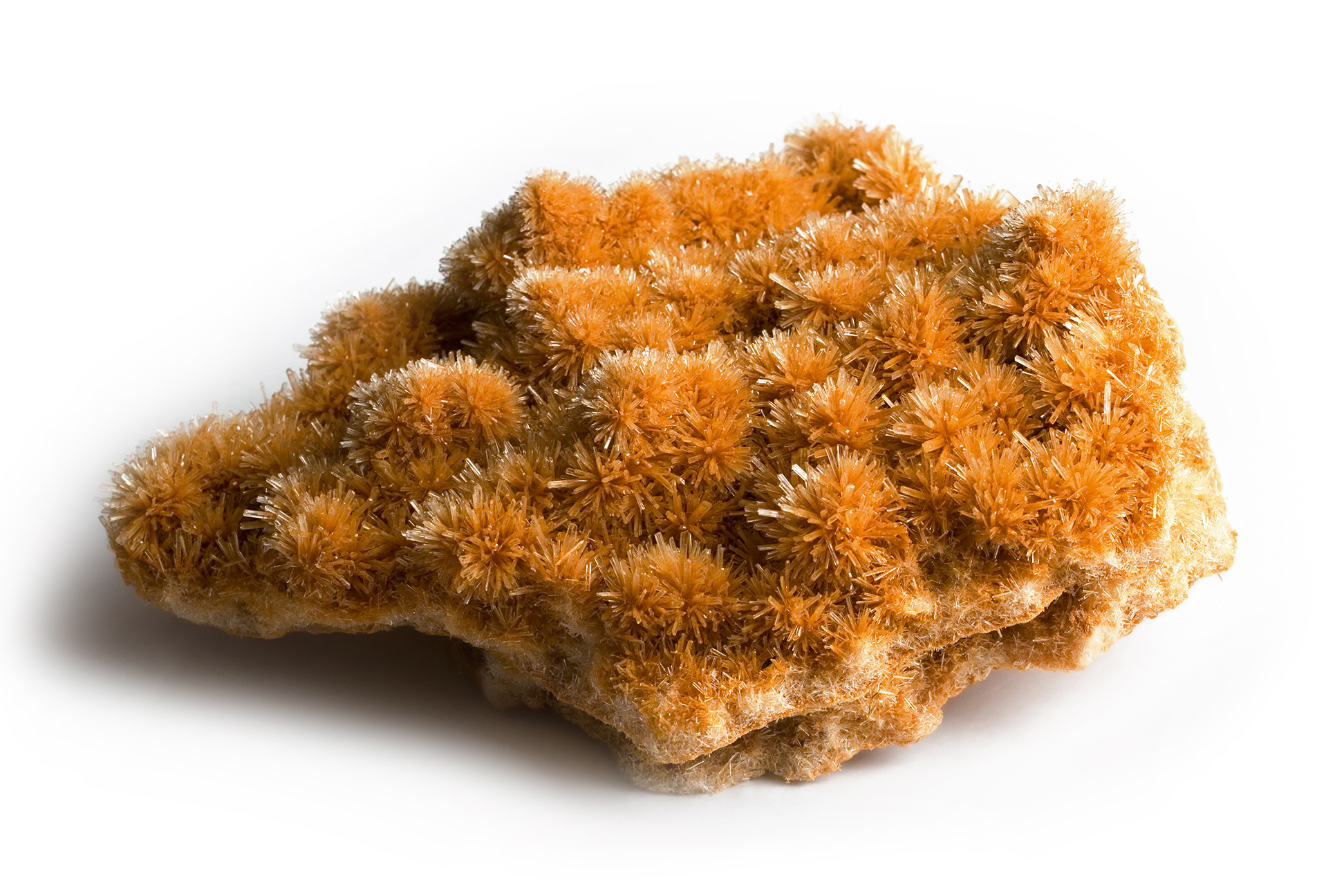
Gypsum var. selenite from Andamooka Ranges - Lake Torrens area, South Australia

== See also ==
- Gypcrust
- Gypsum flora of Nova Scotia
- Gypsum recycling
- Phosphogypsum
