= Five Mile River, Nova Scotia =

Community in Nova Scotia, Canada

Five Mile River
- Location in Nova Scotia
- Coordinates: 45°13′2″N 63°36′53″W
- Country: Canada
- Province: Nova Scotia
- County: Hants County
- Municipality: East Hants Municipality
- Time zone: UTC-4 (AST)
  - Summer (DST): UTC-3 (ADT)
- Canadian Postal Code: B0N
- Area code: 902
- Telephone Exchange: 883
- NTS Map: 011E04
- GNBC Code: CAMFI

Five Mile River is an unincorporated community in the Canadian province of Nova Scotia, located in East Hants Municipality in Hants County. The community takes its name from the river which runs through it, and includes the locality of Three Mile River.

The first land grants in the area were 750 acres to John McMonagle on April 10, 1811; 400 acres to Duncan McDonald on August 10, 1811; 500 acres to Robert O'Brien on February 23, 1815; and 350 acres to William Sim on March 30, 1829. A church was erected in the area in 1853 and consecrated on June 29, 1856. A new church was almost completed by June 1881, and was consecrated on August 24 of the same year as the church of St. John the Baptist. In 1866, the post office in Five Mile River was known as "Densmores Way Office".
