= Gypcrust =

Hardened layer of soil with a high percentage of gypsum

Gypcrete or gypcrust is a hardened layer of soil, consisting of around 95% gypsum (calcium sulfate). Gypcrust is an arid zone duricrust. It can also occur in a semiarid climate in a basin with internal drainage, and is initially developed in a playa as an evaporate. Gypcrete is the arid climate's equivalent to calcrete, which is a duricrust that is unable to generate in very arid climates.

== Composition ==
Gypcrust horizons can be up to 5 m (16 ft) thick with a 75–97% gypsum (CaSO_{4}∙2H_{2}O) content. The majority of gypsum-rich layers occur where the average annual rainfall is less than 250 mm because gypsum is moderately soluble (c. 2.6 g^{−1} at 25 °C) and is normally leached out under higher rainfall conditions. Gypsum cements are rarely, if ever, as strong as calcretes or silcretes.

== Formation ==
Gypcrust forms in a manner similar to that of caliche, which is composed of calcium carbonate. The development of gypcrust has three main stages. The first stage is primary crystallization of the surface brines or groundwater; the second stage is transportation and redeposition by wind or water; and the third stage is post-depositional alteration above or below the capillary fringe. Most gypcrust is formed either as a result of soil-forming processes or through the precipitation of cementing agents from groundwater.

== Influence of groundwater on the formation of duricrusts ==
There are two models that are used to illustrate the influence groundwater has on the formations of duricrusts like gypcrust: per ascensum and per descensum. The per ascensum model demonstrates a situation where the water table is relatively close to the surface, allowing solutions to be drawn upwards by evaporation and eventually cement near-surface sediments once they become concentrated enough to trigger precipitation. The per ascensum model is applicable to environments with high rates of surface evaporation like deserts. This type of system only produces thin duricrust layers since the process ultimately seals the surface horizons, which consequently decreases the potential for further evaporation. This model best depicts the formation of gypcrust. The per descensum model describes a system different from that of the formation of gypcrust in which precipitation of minerals occurs at a depth from downward-percolating solutions. This type of system explains the formation of thick duricrust horizons.

== Conditions for formation ==
Gypcretes form in four distinct conditions: in well-drained soils, as buried evaporates, in hydromorphic soils, or by the exposure of subsurface horizons by erosion.

== Profile ==
Gypcrete can be a loose and powdery deposit or a massive crystalline structure. The profile of a gypcrust outcrop can have three layers. The bottom layer is the sand rose horizon at the water table where gypsum develops as aggregates of crystals. The middle layer is composed of massive gypcrete cemented sand, which forms above the water table during evaporation from the capillary fringe; newly formed gypcrete will be hard, and will soften with age. The uppermost layer is usually rich in gypsified roots and has a banded or nodular structure.

== Uses ==
Gypcrete has been used successfully for road construction in the Sahara. Well-cemented gypcrusts may also provide adequate bearing capacity for structures; however, it must be ensured that the underlying uncemented material is not overloaded to avoid collapse.

== See also ==
- Gypsum flora of Nova Scotia – Group of plants in Nova Scotia, Canada
