= Tyge W. Böcher =

Danish botanist (1909–1983)

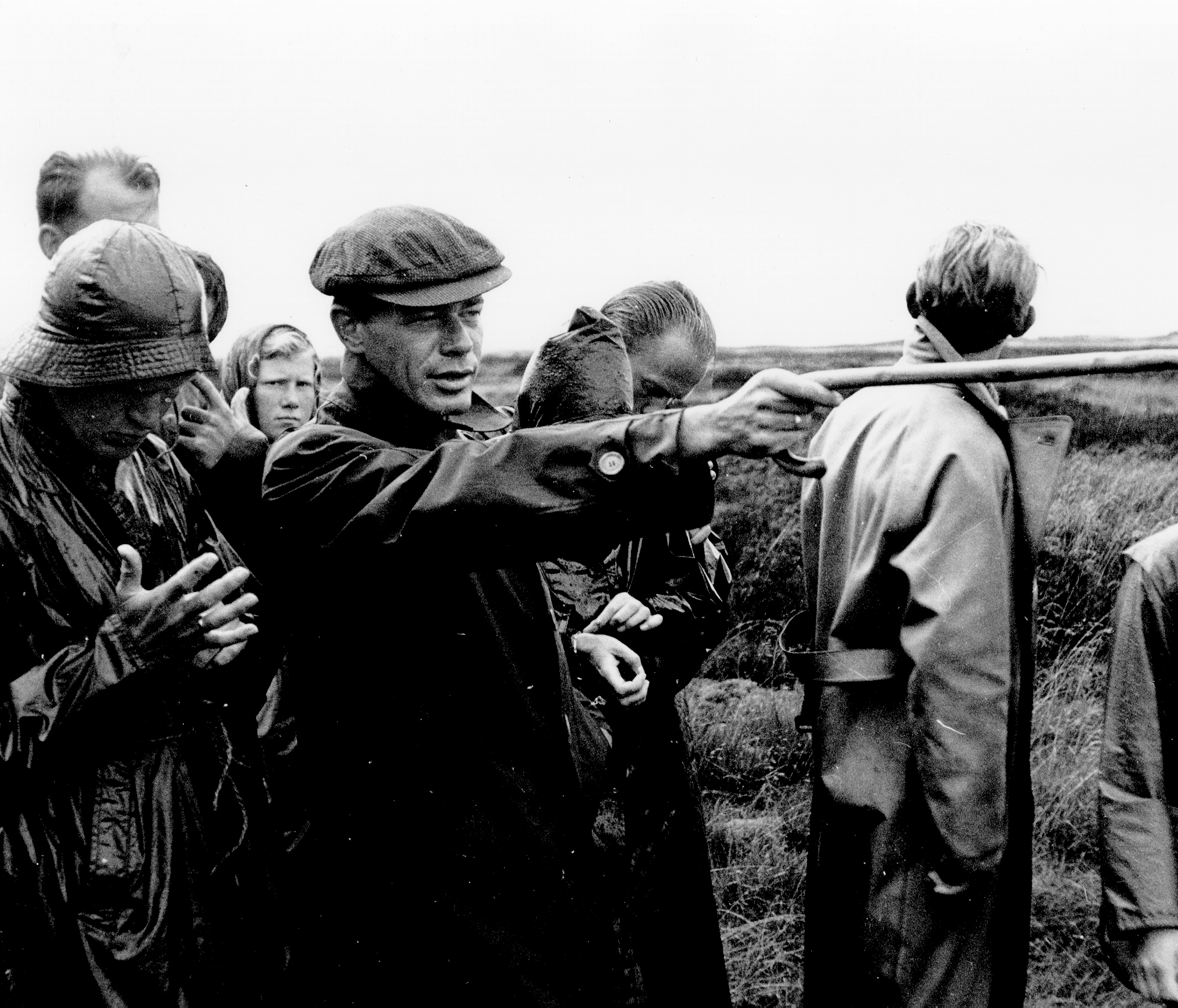
Professor Böcher guiding students on a rainy excursion

Tyge Wittrock Böcher (25 October 1909 – 15 March 1983) was a Danish botanist, evolutionary biologist, plant ecologist and phytogeographer.

He was born in Copenhagen to physician Einar Böcher and wife Cathinca née Andersen. Steen B. Böcher, professor of geography, was his brother.

Tyge Böcher was professor of botany at the University of Copenhagen from 1954 to 1979. He was a prolific scientific writer, leaving some 250 scholarly books and articles. His scientific research covered as diverse phylogenetic lineages as vascular plants, bryophytes, lichens and algae and a broad set of disciplines from anatomy, ecology and evolution of plant species to the ecology of plant populations and plant communities. He was particularly interested in chromosomal and ecological races of plant species. He did field work in Greenland, Denmark, various European mountain regions and in Argentina. His investigation of the Greenland flora were particularly ground-breaking.

He was a co-founder of Flora Europaea and he authored the Flora of Greenland (1968).

The genus Boechera Á.Löve & D.Löve is named after him.

== Scientific works by T.W. Böcher ==
=== 1932-1935 ===
- Beiträge zur Zytologie der Gattung Anemone. Botanisk Tidsskrift 42: 183-206. 1932.
  - Keywords: Pulsatilla pratensis, Pulsatilla vernalis, Pulsatilla vulgaris, cytology
- Phytogeographical studies of the Greenland flora based upon investigations of the coast between Scoresby Sound and Angmagsalik. Meddelelser om Grønland 104, 3. 1933.
  - Keywords: Greenland, plant geography
- Studies on the vegetation of the East coast of Greenland between Scoresby Sound and Angmagsalik (Christian IX's Land). Meddelelser om Grønland 104, 4. 1933
  - Keywords: Greenland, arctic vegetation
- Botany. Appendix to Ejnar Mikkelsen: The Blosseville Coast of East Greenland. Geographical Journal (London) 81: 400-402. 1933.
  - Keywords: Greenland, arctic vegetation
- Om en måde til undersøgelse af konstans, skudtæthed og homogenitet (Eng. summ. On a method for investigating constancy, shoots density and homogeneity). Botanisk Tidsskrift 43: 278-304. 1935.
  - Keywords: methodology, vegetation

=== 1936-1939 ===
- cytological studies on Campanula rotundifolia. Hereditas 22: 269-277. 1936.
- Udbredelsen af Ericaceæ, Vacciniaceæ og Empetraceæ i Danmark. Summary: The distribution of the Ericaceæ, Vacciniaceæ and Empetraceæ in Denmark (Danmarks topografisk-botaniske Undersøgelse Nr. 3). Botanisk Tidsskrift 44: 5-40, 12 maps. 1937.
  - Keywords: Calluna vulgaris, Empetrum nigrum, Erica tetralix, Vaccinium myrtillus, Vaccinium oxycoccos, Vaccinium uliginosum, Vaccinium vitis-idaea, plant geography
- Nogle studier over Færøernes alpine vegetation [Zusammenfassung: Einige Studien über die alpine Vegetation der Färöer Inseln]. Botanisk Tidsskrift 44: 154-201. 1937.
  - Keywords: Faroe Islands, vegetation
- Biological distributional types in the flora of Greenland. A study on the flora and plant-geography of South Greenland and East Greenland between Cape Farewell and Scoresby Sound. Doctoral thesis, University of Copenhagen. Meddelelser om Grønland 106, 2: 1-136. 1938.
  - Keywords: Greenland, plant geography
- cytological studies in the genus Ranunculus. Dansk Botanisk Arkiv 9, 4: 1-33. 1938.
- Zur Zytologie einiger arktischen und borealen Blütenpflanzen. Svensk Botanisk Tidskrift 32: 346-361. 1938.

=== 1940-1944 ===
- Studies on the plant-geography of the North-Atlantic heath-formation. I. The heaths of the Faeroes. Biologiske Meddelelser / Kongelige Danske Videnskabernes Selskab 15, 3: 1-64. 1940.
  - Keywords: vegetation
- Introductory studies on variation and life-forms in Brunella vulgaris L. Dansk Botanisk Arkiv 10, 3: 1-15. 1940.
  - Keywords: ecotype
- Vegetationen på Randbøl Hede. Med særlig hensyntagen til det fredede areal. Biologiske Skrifter / Kongelige Danske Videnskabernes Selskab 1, 3: 1-234. 1941.
  - Keywords: Denmark, Heath, vegetation
- Beiträge zur Pflanzengeographie und Ökologie dänischer Vegetation. 1. Über die Flechtenheiden und Dünen der Insel Läsö. Biologiske Skrifter / Kongelige Danske Videnskabernes Selskab 2, 1: 1-38. 1941.
  - Keywords: Denmark, Heath, Lichen, vegetation
- On the origin of Saxifraga nathorsti (Dusén) v. Hayek. Meddelelser om Grønland 131, 2: 1-14. 1941.
  - Keywords: Greenland, speciation
- Vegetationsstudier på halvøen Ulvshale. Botanisk Tidsskrift 46: 1-42. 1942.
  - Keywords: Denmark, vegetation
- Studies on variation and biology in Plantago lanceolata L. Dansk Botanisk Arkiv. 11,3: 1-18. 1943.
  - Keywords: ecotype
- Studies on the plant geography of the North-Atlantic heath formation II. Danish dwarf shrub communities in relation to those of Northern Europe. Biologiske Skrifter / Kongelige Danske Videnskabernes Selskab 2, 7: 1-130. 1943.
  - Keywords: Denmark, Heath, vegetation
- Nordische Verbreitungstypen. Svensk Botanisk Tidskrift 37: 352-370. 1943.
  - Keywords: Scandinavia, plant geography
- Polyploidy in the genus Koeleria. Hereditas 29: 499-500. 1943.
  - Keywords: cytology, Koeleria glauca, Koeleria pyramidata
- The leaf size of Veronica officinalis in relation to genetic and environmental factors. Dansk Botanisk Arkiv 11, 7: 1-20. 1944.
  - Keywords: cytology, ecotype

=== 1945-1949 ===
- Beiträge zur Pflanzengeographie und Ökologie Dänischer Vegetation. II. Über die Waldsaum- und Graskrautgesellschaften trockener und halbtrockener Böden der Insel Seeland mit besonderer Berücksichtigung der Strandabhänge und Strandebenen. Biologiske Skrifter / Kongelige Danske Videnskabernes Selskab 4, 1: 1-163. 1945.
  - Keywords: Denmark, grassland, plant geography, vegetation
- Meiosis in Anemone apennina with special reference to chiasma localisation. Hereditas 31: 221-237. 1945.
  - Keywords: cytology
- Ochromonas viridis sp.n., a green flagellate belonging to Chrysomonadinae. Videnskabelige meddelelser fra Dansk Naturhistorisk Forening 108: 233-238. 1945.
  - Keywords: algae
- Græs-urte-vegetationen pa Høje Møn. Botanisk Tidsskrift 48: 1-45. 1946.
  - Keywords: Denmark, grassland, vegetation
- Dichothrix gelatinosa sp. n. Its structure and resting organs. Biologiske Skrifter / Kongelige Danske Videnskabernes Selskab 4, 4: 1-14. 1946.
  - Keywords: algae
- Some experiments to elucidate the influence of winter conditions on shoot development and floral initiation on various races of Prunella vulgaris and Ranunculus acer. Dansk Botanisk Arkiv 12, 3: 1-16. 1946.
  - Keywords: ecotype
- Pseudanabaena biceps, a new sapropelic species from bottom mud. Botaniska Notiser 1946: 281-284. 1946
  - Keywords: algae
- Cytogenetic and biological studies in Geranium robertianum L. Biologiske Meddelelser / Kongelige Danske Videnskabernes Selskab 20, 8: 1-29. 1947.
  - Keywords: cytology, ecotype
- Festuca polesica Zapał., its chromosome number and occurrence in Denmark. Botaniska Notiser 1947: 353-360. 1947.
  - Keywords: cytology
- Cytological studies of Arabis holboellii Hornem. Hereditas 33: 573. 1947.
- & T. Christensen & M.S. Christiansen. Slope and dune vegetation of North Jutland. I. Himmerland. Biologiske Skrifter / Kongelige Danske Videnskabernes Selskab 4, 4: 1-78. 1946.
  - Keywords: Denmark, dune, grassland, vegetation
- Plant geography and plant sociology. In: The Humanities and Sciences in Denmark during the Second World War; pp. 309–312. Copenhagen 1948.
- Contributions to the flora and plant geography of West Greenland. I. Selaginella rupestris and Sisyrinchium montanum. Meddelelser om Grønland 147, 3: 1-26. 1948.
- Studies on the sapropelic flora of the lake Flyndersø with special reference to the Oscillatoriaceae. Biologiske Meddelelser / Kongelige Danske Videnskabernes Selskab 21, 1: 1-46. 1949.
  - Keywords: algae
- The botanical expedition to West Greenland 1946. Meddelelser om Grønland 147, 1: 1-28. 1949.
- Climate, soil and lakes in continental West Greenland in relation to plant life. Meddelelser om Grønland 147, 2: 1-63. 1949.
- Racial divergences in Prunella vulgaris in relation to habitat and climate. New Phytologist 48: 285-314. 1949.
  - Keywords: ecotype

=== 1950-1954 ===
- Structure and biology of four species of the Stigonemataceae from a shallow pool at Ivigtut. Meddelelser om Grønland 147, 5: 1-120. 1950.
  - Keywords: algae, Greenland
- Chromosome behaviour and syncyte formation in Phleum phleoides (L.) Karst. Botaniska Notiser 1950: 353-368. 1950.
  - Keywords: cytology
- & Kai Larsen. Chromosome numbers of some Arctic or boreal flowering plants. Meddelelser om Grønland 147, 6: 1-32. 1950.
- Contributions to the flora and plant geography of West Greenland II. The Carex capitata-, the Luzula multiflora-, and the Torularia humilis-complexes. Meddelelser om Grønland 147, 7: 1-39. 1950.
  - Keywords: arctic vegetation
- A. Noe-Nygaard, Chr. Vibe T.W. Böcher & E. Holtved. Notes on Danish scientific work since 1939. Arctic 4: 50-56. 1951.
- Botanical investigations in South West Greenland, 1946. Arctic 4 (1): 46-49. 1951.
- Studies on morphological progression and evolution in the vegetable kingdom. Biologiske Meddelelser / Kongelige Danske Videnskabernes Selskab 18, 13: 1-51. 1951.
  - Keywords: evolution
- Distributions of plants in the circumpolar area in relation to ecological and historical factors. Journal of Ecology 39: 376-395. 1951.
  - Keywords: plant geography, Holarctic
- Studies on the distribution of the units within the collective species of Stellaria longipes. Botanisk Tidsskrift 48: 401-420. 1951.
  - Keywords: Caryophyllaceae, Greenland, plant geography
- Cytological and embryologal studies in the amphiapomictic Arabis holboellii complex. Biologiske Skrifter / Kongelige Danske Videnskabernes Selskab 6, 7: 1-59. 1951.
- Lichen-heaths and plant succession at Østerby on the isle of Læsø in the Kattegat. Biologiske Skrifter / Kongelige Danske Videnskabernes Selskab 7, 4: 1-24. 1952.
  - Keywords: Denmark, vegetation
- A study of the circumpolar Carex heleonastes-amblyorhyncha complex. Acta Arctica 5: 1-31. 1952.-
  - Keywords: Greenland, speciation
- Contributions to the flora and plant geography of West Greenland. III. Vascular plants collected or observed during the botanical expedition to West Greenland 1946. Meddelelser om Grønland 147, 9: 1-85. 1952.
- Vegetationsudvikling i forhold til marin akkumulation. 1. Korshage ved indløbet til Isefjord. Botanisk Tidsskrift 49: 1-32. 1952.
  - Keywords: Denmark, succession, vegetation
- Some small collections of vascular plants form the Southern part of Greenland. Botanisk Tidsskrift 49: 196-198. 1952.
- & K. Larsen & K. Rahn. Experimental and cytological studies on plant species. 1. Kohlrauschia prolifera and Plantago coronopus. Hereditas 39: 289-304. 1953.
- Cultivation experiments with Geranium robertianum, Veronica officinalis and Prunella vulgaris. Proc. 7th International Bot. Congr. Stockholm 1950: 268-269. 1953.
- The steppe vegetation in continental West Greenland. Proc. 7th International Bot. Congr. Stockholm 1950: 612-613. 1954.
  - Keywords: Greenland, vegetation
- Studies on European calcareous fixed dune communities. Vegetatio 5-6: 562-570. 1954.
  - Keywords: dune, vegetation
- Experimental taxonomical studies in the Arabis holboellii complex. Svensk Botanisk Tidskrift 48: 31-44. 1954.
- Natural populations of Pulsatilla in Zealand. Botanisk Tidsskrift 51: 33-47. 1954.
  - Keywords: Pulsatilla pratensis, Pulsatilla vulgaris
- Oceanic and continental vegetational complexes in Southwest Greenland. Meddelelser om Grønland 148, 1: 1-336. 1954.
  - Keywords: Greenland, vegetation

=== 1955-1959 ===
- Böcher, T.W., Holmen, K. & Dunbar, M.J. Recent biological research in Greenland. Arctic 7 (3-4): 284-295. 1955.
- & K. Larsen & K. Rahn. Experimental and cytological studies on plant species II. Trifolium arvense and some other pauciennial herbs. Biologiske Skrifter / Kongelige Danske Videnskabernes Selskab 8, 3: 1-31. 1955.
  - Keywords: Acinos arvensis, cytology, Galium aparine, Petrorhagia prolifera, Trifolium arvense
- & K. Larsen & K. Rahn. Experimental and cytological studies on plant species III. Plantago coronopus and allied species. Hereditas 41: 423-453. 1955.
- & K. Larsen. Chromosome studies on some European flowering plants. Botanisk Tidsskrift 52: 125-132. 1955.
  - Keywords: Anthriscus sylvestris, Arabis glabra, Arnica montana, Centaurea scabiosa, Chaerophyllum temulum, Cytisus scoparius, cytology, Dryas octopetala, Geranium robertianum, Senecio jacobaea, Vincetoxicum hirundinaria
- Further studies in Braya humilis and allied species. Meddelelser om Grønland 124, 7: 1-29. 1956.
- Area-limits and isolations of plants in relation to the physiography of the southern parts of Greenland. Meddelelser om Grønland 124, 8: 1-40. 1955.
  - Keywords: Greenland, plant geography
- Hieracium acranthophorum var. isortoqense var. nov. With remarks on the section Foliosa in Greenland. Botanisk Tidsskrift 53: 279-283. 1957.
- & K. Larsen. Cytotaxonomical studies in the Sanguisorba minor complex. Botanisk Tidsskrift 53: 284-290. 1957.
- & K. Holmen & K. Jakobsen. Grønlands flora (ill. by Ingeborg Frederiksen). København. 313 pp. 1957. (2nd edn 1966; Engl. edn. ‘’’Flora of Greenland’’’ 1968; 3rd edn 1978).
- & K. Larsen. Cytotaxonomical studies in the Chrysanthemum leucanthemum complex. Watsonia 4: 11-16. 1957.
- Plants collected by Danish geodesists in Scoresbysund. Botanisk Tidsskrift 54: 61-63. 1958.
- Chromosome studies in the Ranunculus polyanthemus complex. Botanisk Tidsskrift 54: 160-166. 1958.
- & M.W. Bentzon. Density determinations in plant communities. Oikos 9: 35-36. 1958.
  - Keywords: methodology, vegetation
- & K. Larsen. Experimental and cytological studies on plant species. IV. Further studies in short-lived herbs. Biologiske Skrifter / Kongelige Danske Videnskabernes Selskab 10, 2: 1-24. 1958.
  - Keywords: Aira caryophyllea, Aira praecox, Alyssum alyssoides, Arabidopsis thaliana, Arenaria serpyllifolia, Bromus hordeaceus, cytology, Geranium molle, Moehringia trinervia, Phleum arenarium, Teesdalia nudicaulis, Trifolium arvense
- & K. Larsen. Secondary polyploidy and ecotypical differentiation in Sarothamnus scoparius. New Phytologist 57: 311-317. 1958.
  - Keywords: cytology, Fabaceae
- & K. Larsen. Geographical distribution of initiation of flowering, growth habit, and other characters in Holcus lanatus L. Botaniska Notiser 111: 289-300. 1958.
  - Keywords: ecotype, phenology, Poaceae
- Tetraploid and hexaploid Trisetum spicatum coll. A cytotaxonomical study. Botanisk Tidsskrift 55. 23-29. 1959.
- The evolution of Arctic and montane plant taxa in the light of chromosome studies and comparative cultivations. Proc. 9. Internat. Bot. Congr. II A: 3-4. 1959.
  - Keywords: evolution
- The chromosomes of Anemone richardsoni Hook. Botaniska Notiser 112: 353-363. 1959.
- Floristic and ecological studies in Middle West Greenland. Meddelelser om Grønland 156, 5: 1-68. 1959.
- & K. Holmen & K. Jakobsen. A synoptical study of the Greenland flora. Meddelelser om Grønland 163, 1: 1-32. 1959.

=== 1960-1964 ===
- Experimental and cytological studies on plant species. V. The Campanula rotundifolia complex. Biologiske Skrifter / Kongelige Danske Videnskabernes Selskab 11, 4: 1-69. 1960.
- Infraspecific differentiation (Coreferate). Planta Medica 8: 224-225. 1960.
  - Keywords: ecotype, evolution
- Floristic and taxonomic activity in Denmark since 1945 essential to the work of Flora Europaea. Floristic Reports, Flora Europaea Genova Symposium 21–28 May 1961: 1-8, 1961.
- The development of cytotaxonomy since Darwin's time. In: A Darwin Centenary”, P.J. Wanstall (ed.): 26-43. 1961.
  - Keywords: cytology, evolution
- Bibliographia Phytosociologica: Grönland. Excerpta Botanica sect. B. 3: 61-67. 1961.
- The evolution of Arctic and montane plant taxa in the light of chromosome studies and comparative cultivations. In: Recent Advances in Botany (Toronto): 925-928. 1961.
  - Keywords: cytology, ecotype, evolution
- Experimental and cytological studies on plant species. VI. Dactylis glomerata and Anthoxanthum odoratum. Botanisk Tidsskrift 56: 314-335. 1961.
  - Keywords: ecotype, Poaceae
- Studies on Pyrolaceae - two interesting Wintergreens from West Greenland. Botanisk Tidsskrift 57: 28-37. 1961.
- A cytological and morphological study of the species hybrid Chamaenerion angustifolium × C. latifolium. Botanisk Tidsskrift 58: 1-34. 1962.
- & S. Lægaard. Botanical studies along the Arfersiorfik Fjord, West Greenland. Botanisk Tidsskrift 58: 168-190. 1962.
- & M.C. Lewis. Experimental and cytological studies on plant species. VII. Geranium sanguineum. Biologiske Skrifter / Kongelige Danske Videnskabernes Selskab 11, 5: 1-25. 1962.
- Floristic and taxonomic activity in Denmark between 1945 and 1960. Webbia 18: 165-172. 1963.
- A cytology deviating west-alpine Campanula of the C. rotundifolia group. Botaniska Notiser 116: 113-121. 1963.
  - Keywords: ecotype
- The study of ecotypical variation in relation to experimental morphology. (Symposium on biosystematics, Montreal 1962). Regnum Vegetabile 27: 10-16. 1963.
  - Keywords: ecotype
- Phytogeography of Greenland in the light of recent investigations. In: "North Atlantic Biota and Their History" (ed. A. & D. Löve), Oxford, Pergamon Press: 285-295. 1963.
- & J.P. Hjerting & K. Rahn. Botanical studies in the Atuel Valley area, Mendoza Province, Argentina. Part l. Dansk Botanisk Arkiv 22, 1: 1-115. 1963.
- Experimental and cytological studies on plant species. VIII. Racial differentiation in amphi-atlantic Viscaria alpina. Biologiske Skrifter / Kongelige Danske Videnskabernes Selskab 11, 6: 1-33. 1963.
  - Keywords: Caryophyllaceae, ecotype
- Phytogeography of Middle West Greenland. Meddelelser om Grønland 148, 3: 1-289. 1964.
- & J.P. Hjerting. Utilization of seeds from botanical gardens in biosystematic studies. Taxon 13: 95-98. 1964.
- Chromosome connections and aberrations in the Campanula persicifolia group. Svensk Botanisk Tidskrift 58: 1-17. 1964.
- Morphology of the vegetative body of Metasequoia glyptostroboides. Dansk Botanisk Arkiv 24, 1: 1-70. 1964.

=== 1965-1969 ===
- Experimental and cytological studies on plant species. IX. Some Arctic and montane Crucifers. Biologiske Skrifter / Kongelige Danske Videnskabernes Selskab 14, 7: 1-74. 1966.

Keywords: Brassicaceae

- Experimental and cytological studies on plant species. X. Sisyrinchium with special reference to the Greenland representative. Botanisk Tidsskrift 61: 273-290. 1966.
  - Keywords: Sisyrinchium groenlandicum
- Experimental and cytological studies on plant species. XI. North Atlantic tetraploids of the Campanula rotundifolia complex. Annales Botanici Fennici 3: 287-298. 1966.
  - Keywords: Campanula gieseckiana, Campanula rotundifolia, cytology, ecotype
- Continuous variation and taxonomy. Taxon 16: 225-258. 1967.
- & O.B. Lyshede. Anatomical studies in xerophytic apophyllous plants. l. Monttea aphylla, Bulnesia retama and Bredemeyera colletioides. Biologiske Skrifter / Kongelige Danske Videnskabernes Selskab 16, 3: 1-44. 1968.
- & J.P. Hjerting & K. Rahn. Botanical studies in the Atuel Valley Area, Mendoza Province, Argentina. Part II. Dansk Botanisk Arkiv 22, 2: 1-178. 1968.
- Experimental and cytological studies on plant species. XII. Sibbaldia procumbens and S. macrophylla. Svensk Botanisk Tidskrift 63: 188-200. 1969.
  - Keywords: cytology, ecotype
- Further studies in Arabis holboellii and allied species. Botanisk Tidsskrift 64: 141-161. 1969.

=== 1970-1974 ===
- The present status of biosystematics. Taxon 19: 3-5. 1970.
- Anatomical studies in Cotton-Thorn, Tetradymia axillaris A. Nels. Naturaliste Canad. 98: 225-250. 1971.
- Variational pattern in Clinopodium vulgare L. In: Evolution in Plants - Symposium held 1–4 September 1970 at Tihany, Hungary, 12: 23-29. 1972.
  - Keywords: ecotype, Lamiaceae
- Evolutionary problems in the Arctic flora. In: “Taxonomy, Phytogeography and Evolution" (edit. by D.H. Valentine), London; pp. 101–113. 1972.
  - Keywords: evolution
- Leaf anatomy in Sporobolus rigens (Tr.) Desv. (Gramineae). Botaniska Notiser 124: 344-360, 1972.
- Comparative anatomy of three species of the apophyllous genus Gymnophyton. American Journal of Botany 59: 494-503. 1972.
- & J.P. Hjerting & K. Rahn. Botanical studies in the Atuel Valley Area, Mendoza Province, Argentina. Part III. Dansk Botanisk Arkiv 22, 3: 189-358. 1972.
- & C.A. Jørgensen. Jyske dværgbuskheder. Eksperimentelle undersøgelser af forskellige kulturindgrebs indflydelse på vegetationen. Biologiske Skrifter / Kongelige Danske Videnskabernes Selskab 19, 5: l-55. 1972.
  - Keywords: Denmark, Heath, conservation management
- & O.B. Lyshede. Anatomical studies on xerophytic apophyllous plants. II. Additional species from South American shrub steppes. Biologiske Skrifter / Kongelige Danske Videnskabernes Selskab 18, 4: 1-137. 1972.
- Interspecific hybridization in Braya (Cruciferae). Annales Botanici Fennici 10: 57-65. 1973.
  - Keywords: Braya humilis, Braya purpurascens, speciation
- Variation and distribution pattern in Draba sibirica (Pall.) Thell. Botaniska Notiser 127: 317-327. 1974.
  - Keywords: ecotype, plant geography

=== 1975-1979 ===
- Density determinations in Arctic plant communities. Phytocoenologia 2: 73-86. 1975.
  - Keywords: Arctic, methodology, vegetation
- Structure of the multinodal photosynthetic thorns in Prosopis kuntzei Harms. Biologiske Skrifter / Kongelige Danske Videnskabernes Selskab 20, 8: 1-43. 1975.
- Experimental and cytological studies on plant species. XIII. Clinopodium vulgare L. Botanisk Tidsskrift 70: 152-179. 1975.
  - Keywords: cytology, ecotype
- Convergence as an evolutionary process. Botanical Journal of the Linnean Society 75: 1-19. 1977.
  - Keywords: evolution
- Cerastium alpinum and C. arcticum - a mature polyploid complex. Botaniska Notiser 130: 303-309. 1977.
  - Keywords: cytology, ecotype
- Ecogeographical classification of arctic vegetation based on shoots density determinations. Meddelelser om Grønland 199, 6: 1-61. 1977.
  - Keywords: plant geography, vegetation
- Experimental and cytological studies on plant species. XIV. Artificial hybridizations in Viscaria. Botanisk Tidsskrift 72: 31-44. 1977.
  - Keywords: cytology, ecotype, Lychnis alpina, Lychnis viscaria
- Phytogeography of Greenland (Survey and methods). In: B.A. Yurtsev, The Arctic floristic region, papers read at the symposium "Floristic delimitation and subdivision of the Arctic", 8 July, 1975 in Leningrad; 127-142. 1978.
- & P. Olesen. Structural and ecophysiological pattern in the xero-halophytic C4 grass, Sporobolus rigens (Tr.) Desv. Biologiske Skrifter / Kongelige Danske Videnskabernes Selskab 22, 3: 1-48. 1978.
- Xeromorphic leaf types: Evolutionary strategies and tentative semophyletic sequences. Biologiske Skrifter / Kongelige Danske Videnskabernes Selskab 22, 8: 1-71. 1979.
- Böcher, Tyge W. (1979). "Birch Woodlands and Tree Growth in Southern Greenland". Holarctic Ecology. 2 (4): 218–221. ISSN 0105-9327. JSTOR 3682415.

=== 1980-1983 ===
- Evolutionary trends in Ericalean leaf structure. Biologiske Skrifter / Kongelige Danske Videnskabernes Selskab 23, 2: 1-64. 1981.
- A developmental analysis of the photosynthesizing organs in Prosopis kuntzei. Biologiske Skrifter / Kongelige Danske Videnskabernes Selskab 23, 4: 1-50. 1982.
- The allotetraploid Saxifraga nathorstii and its probable progenitors S. aizoides and S. oppositifolia. MoG Bioscience 11: 1-22. 1983.
  - Keywords: cytology, speciation

== Works on T. W. Böcher ==
- Löve, Áskell (1984). "In Memoriam: Tyge W. Böcher, 1909-1983". Arctic and Alpine Research. 16 (1): 119–120. JSTOR 1551177.
