= Olaf Hagerup =

Danish botanist

Olaf Hagerup (29 September 1889 – 2 March 1961) was a Danish botanist. He studied botany at the University of Copenhagen from 1911 under the professors Eugenius Warming, Christen C. Raunkiær, L. Kolderup Rosenvinge og W. Johannsen. He took his Ph.D. from the same university in 1930. From 1934 to 1960, he was superintendent at the Botanical Museum of the University of Copenhagen.

Hagerup’s scientific works concern evolution, polyploidy and pollination, among other things. He showed that the tetraploid Empetrum hermaphroditum is a separate species from the diploid Empetrum nigrum. He thereby initiated the use of chromosome numbers in systematic botany, a field later known as cytotaxonomy. He put forward the hypothesis that the ploidy level is an important factor in the distribution and ecology of plant species. In contrast, another of his scientific ideas has been disproven by later modern research – the idea of a direct ancestry of the centrosperms (approximately equal to Caryophyllales) from the gymnospermous Gnetophyta and, hence, two separate evolutionary lineages within the flowering plants. Many of Hagerup’s studies were concerned with plant species of the Ericaceae, Empetraceae and related families, or ’’Bicornes’’ as they were known in the Wettstein system.

The cranberry Oxycoccus hagerupii (Ericaceae) was named to his honour by Á. & D. Löve (later transferred to Vaccinium by Hannu Ahokas as Vaccinium hagerupii.

== Scientific works ==
- Hagerup, O. (1915) The structure and biology of arctic flowering plants. 10. Caprifoliaceae. Linnaea borealis L. Meddelelser om Grønland 37: 151-164.
- Hagerup, O. (1922) Om Empetrum nigrum L. En naturhistorisk Studie (On Empetrum nigrum L. A study of natural history). Botanisk Tidsskrift 37 (4): 253-304.
- Hagerup, O. (1922) Om "Lobelia-Diagram" hos Erica cinerea L. (On ”Lobelia diagram” by Erica cinerea L.) Botanisk Tidsskrift 38: 137-140.
- Hagerup, O. (1926) Kønsdelenes Bygning og Udvikling hos Koenigia islandica L. (The anatomy and development of sexual structures in Koenigia islandica L.) Meddelelser om Grønland 58 (3): 197-204.
- Hagerup, O. (1927) Empetrum hermaphroditum (Lge) Hagerup, a new tetraploid, bisexual species. Dansk Botanisk Arkiv 5 (2): 1–17.
- Hagerup, O. (1928) Morphological and cytological studies of Bicornes. Dansk Botanisk Arkiv 6 (1): 1-27.
- Hagerup, O. (1928) En hygrofil bælgplante (Aeschynomene aspera L.) med Bakterieknolde paa Stængelen (A hydrophilic legume (Aeschynomene aspera L.) with bacterial nodules on the stem). Dansk Botanisk Arkiv 5 (14): 1-9.
- Hagerup, O. (1929) Étude des types biologiques de Raunkiær dans la flore autour de Tombouctou. Biologiske Meddelelser, Kongelige Danske Videnskabernes Selskab 9 (4): 1-116.
- Hagerup, O. (1930) Über die Bedeutung der Schirmform der Krone von Acacia seyal Del. Dansk Botanisk Arkiv 6 (4): 1-20.
- Hagerup, O. (1930) Vergleichende Morphologische und Systematische Studien über die Ranken und Andre Vegetative Organe der Cucurbitaceen und Pasifloraceen. Doctoral dissertation, University of Copenhagen. Dansk Botanisk Arkiv 6 (8): 1-104.
- Hagerup, O. (1932) Über Polyploidie in Beziehung zu klima, Ökologie und Phylogenie. Hereditas 16: 19-40.
- Hagerup, O. (1932) On Pollination in the extremely hot air at Timbuctu. Dansk Botanisk Arkiv 8 (1): 1-20.
- Hagerup, O. (1933) Studies on polyploid ecotypes in Vaccinium uliginosum L. Hereditas 18 (1-2): 122-128.
- Hagerup, O. (1933) Zur Organogenie und Phylogenie der Koniferenzapfen. Biologiske Meddelelser, Kongelige Danske Videnskabernes Selskab 10 (7).
- Hagerup, O. (1934) Zur Abstammung einiger Angiospermen durch Gnetales und Coniferæ, I. Biologiske Meddelelser, Kongelige Danske Videnskabernes Selskab 11 (4): 1-83.
- Hagerup, O. (1935) Zur Periodizität im Laubwechsel der Moose. Biologiske Meddelelser, Kongelige Danske Videnskabernes Selskab 11 (9): 1-88.
- Hagerup, O. (1936) Zur Abstammung einiger Angiospermen durch Gnetales und Coniferæ, II. Centrospermae. Biologiske Meddelelser, Kongelige Danske Videnskabernes Selskab 13 (6): 1-60.
- Hagerup, O. (1938) On the origin of some Angiosperms through the Gnetales and the Coniferae. III. The gynaecium of Salix cinerea. Biologiske Meddelelser, Kongelige Danske Videnskabernes Selskab 14 (4): 1-34.
- Hagerup, O. (1938) A peculiar asymmetrical mitosis in the microspore of Orchis. Hereditas 24: 94-96.
- Hagerup, O. (1938) Studies on the significance of polyploidy. II. Orchis. Hereditas 24: 258-264.
- Hagerup, O. (1939) On the origin of some Angiosperms through the Gnetales and the Coniferae. IV. The gynaecium of Personatae. Biologiske Meddelelser, Kongelige Danske Videnskabernes Selskab 15 (2): 1-39.
- Hagerup, O. (1939) Studies on the significance of polyploidy. III. Deschampsia and Aira. Hereditas 25: 185-192.
- Hagerup, O. (1940) Studies on the significance of polyploidy. IV. Oxycoccus. Hereditas 26: 399-410.
- Hagerup, O. (1941) Zytoökologische Bicornes-Studien. Planta 32: 6-14.
- Hagerup, O. (1941) Bestøvningen hos Liparis og Malaxis. (Pollination in Liparis and Malaxis). Botanisk Tidsskrift 45: 396-402.
- Hagerup, O. (1942) The morphology and biology of the Corylus-fruit. Biologiske Meddelelser, Kongelige Danske Videnskabernes Selskab 17 (6): 1-42.
- Hagerup, O. (1942) Myre-Bestøvning. (Ant pollination). Botanisk Tidsskrift 46: 116-123.
- Hagerup, O. (1944) Notes on some boreal polyploids. Hereditas 30: 152-160.
- Hagerup, O. (1944) On fertilization, polyploidy and haploidy in Orchis maculatus L. sens. lat. Dansk Botanisk Arkiv 11 (5): 1-26.
- Hagerup, O. (1944) Basidiens cytologi hos Tremellodon gelatinosum (Scop.) Pers. (Cytology of the basidia by Tremellodon gelatinosum (Scop.) Pers). Friesia 3: 46-51.
- Hagerup, O. (1945) Facultative parthenogenesis and haploidy in Epipactis latifolia. Biologiske Meddelelser, Kongelige Danske Videnskabernes Selskab 19 (11): 1-14.
- Hagerup, O. (1945) Basidiens cytologi hos Lepiota (Limacella) lenticularis Lasch (Cytology of the basidia by Lepiota (Limacella) lenticularis Lasch). Friesia 3: 96-100.
- Hagerup, O. (1946) Studies on the Empetraceae. Biologiske Meddelelser, Kongelige Danske Videnskabernes Selskab 20 (5): 1-49.
- Hagerup, O. (1947) The spontaneous formation of haploid, polyploid, and aneuploid embryos in some orchids. Biologiske Meddelelser, Kongelige Danske Videnskabernes Selskab 20 (9): 1-22.
- Hagerup, O. (1950) Thrips pollination in Calluna. Biologiske Meddelelser, Kongelige Danske Videnskabernes Selskab 18 (4): 1-16.
- Hagerup, O. (1950) Rain-pollination. Biologiske Meddelelser, Kongelige Danske Videnskabernes Selskab 18 (5): 1-18.
- Hagerup, O. (1951) Pollination in the Faroes - in spite of rain and poverty in insects. Biologiske Meddelelser, Kongelige Danske Videnskabernes Selskab 18 (15): 1-48.
- Hagerup, O. (1952) Bud autogamy in some northern orchids. Phytomorphology 2: 51-61.
- Hagerup, O. (1952) The morphology and biology of some primitive orchid flowers. Phytomorphology 2: 134-138.
- Hagerup, O. (1953) Autogami hos Chamaeorchis. Blyttia 11: 1-5.
- Hagerup, Else & Olaf (1953) Thrips pollination of Erica tetralix. New Phytologist 52 (1): 1-7
- Hagerup, O. (1953) The morphology and systematics of the leaves in Ericales. Phytomorphology 3: 459-464.
- Hagerup, O. (1953) Thrips-pollination in Hypochoeris radicata. Nytt Magasin for Botanik 3: 55-58.
- Hagerup, O. (1954) Autogamy in some drooping Bicornes flowers. Botanisk Tidsskrift 51: 103-116.
- Hagerup, O. (1957) Wind autogamy in Arbutus. Bulletin du Jardin botanique de l'État a Bruxelles 27 (1): 41-47.
- Hagerup, Olaf & Petersson, Vagn (1956–1960) Botanical Atlas. Copenhagen: Munksgaard.
  - Vol. I: Angiosperms, 550 p.
  - Vol. II: Mosses, Ferns, Horsetails, Clubmosses, Conifers, Evolution. 299 p.
