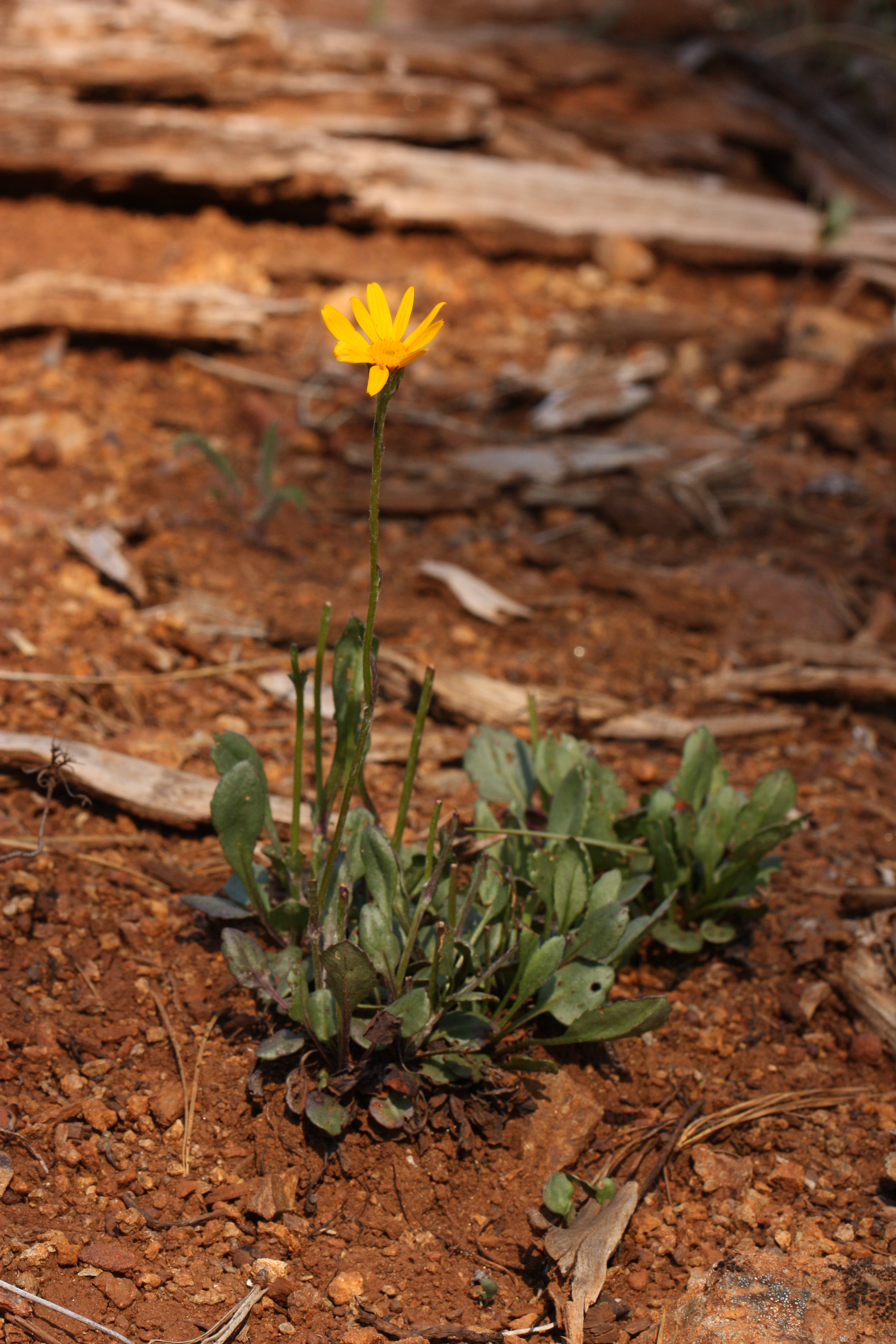

Conservation status
- Vulnerable (NatureServe)

Scientific classification
- Kingdom: Plantae
- Clade: Tracheophytes
- Clade: Angiosperms
- Clade: Eudicots
- Clade: Asterids
- Order: Asterales
- Family: Asteraceae
- Genus: Packera
- Species: P. hesperia

Binomial name
- Packera hesperia (Greene) W.A.Weber & Á.Löve

Synonyms
- Senecio hesperius Greene

= Packera hesperia =

Species of flowering plant

Packera hesperia is a flowering plant in the aster family, Asteraceae. Commonly known as western ragwort and as serpentine groundsel, it is endemic to the Siskiyou Mountains, where it grows on serpentine soils. Conservation groups have identified this species as vulnerable, in part due to its limited geographic distribution.

== Description ==
Packera hesperia is a perennial with fibrous roots and a single herbaceous stem 7–15 cm tall, which can be either smooth or sparsely covered by woolly hairs. The basal leaves are 1–3 cm long and 0.5–2 cm wide, petiolate with tapering bases, and have either smooth or toothed margins. Cauline leaves are much smaller, have smooth edges, and clasp the stem.

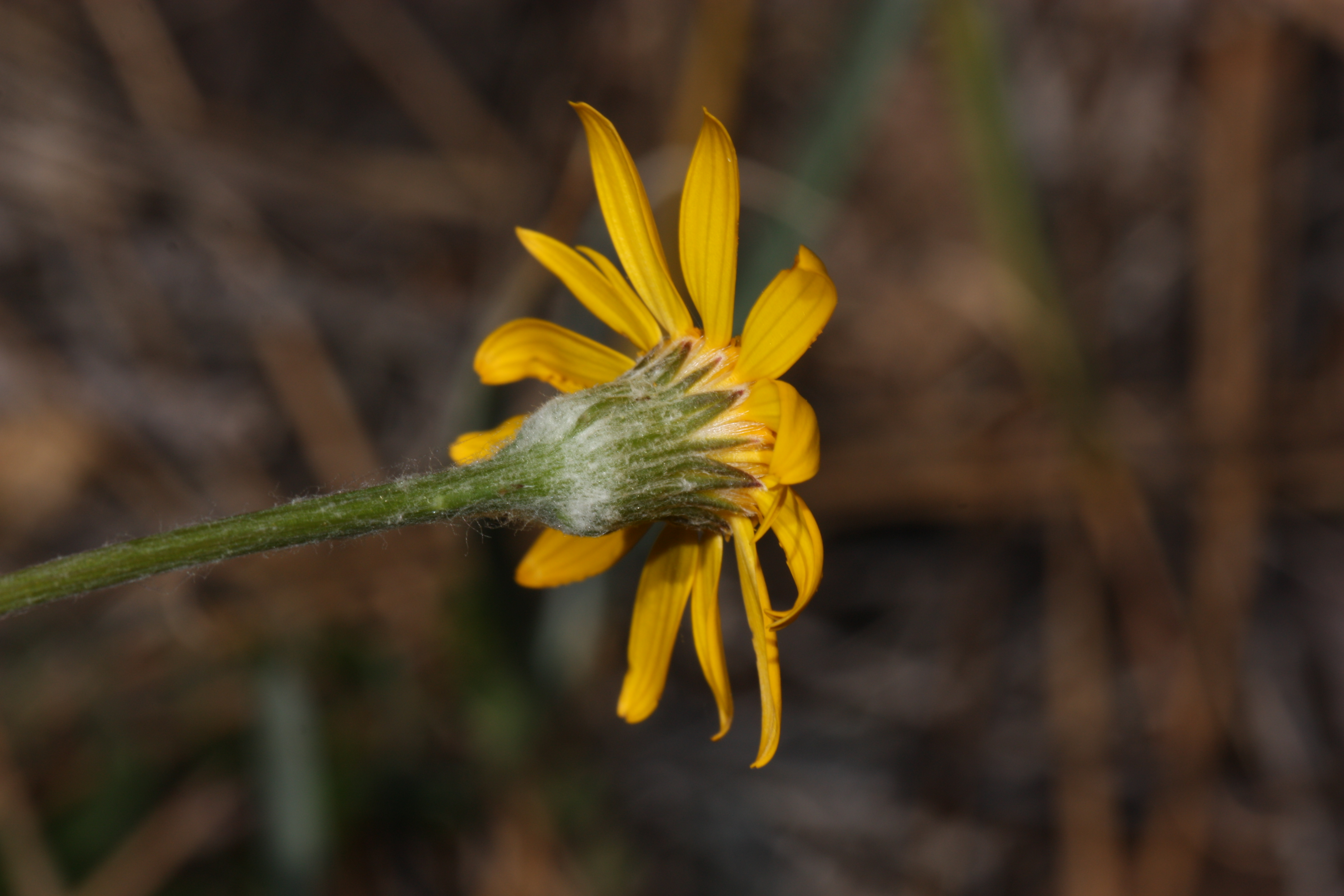
The woolly phyllaries of P. hesperia help distinguish it from similar species, like Packera subnuda var. subnuda.

At the end of the stem, there is a corymb bearing 1–4 flowering heads held on densely-woolly penduncles. Both the phyllaries (whorls of green bracts forming a cup-like structure that holds the flower) and the calyculi (bracts subtending the phyllaries) are green with red tinges or tips. The phyllaries are densely-woolly near their bases.

Flowering occurs from mid-April to mid-June. The flower is composite, with 8–13 yellow ray florets 6–10 mm long and 30–50 disc florets. The cypselae (dry fruit holding a single seed) are 1.5–2 mm long. The pappi, which act as parachutes for the seeds during wind dispersal, are 5–6 mm long.

== Taxonomy ==
Thomas J. Howell collected the type specimen of Packera hesperia in southern Oregon, and Edward Greene formally described the taxon as Senecio hesperius in 1891. The epithet hesperius (now hesperia) comes from the Greek for "western," referring to the plant's geographic distribution. In 1976, Áskell and Doris Löve segregated a new genus, Packera, out of Senecio based on chromosome number (x=22 or 23) and morphological features. Together with William Alfred Weber, Áskell Löve recombined this species from S. hesperius to P. hesperius in 1981. Its chromosome number is 2n=46.

== Distribution and habitat ==
Packera hesperia is endemic to the Siskiyou Mountains, where it grows at elevations of 500–2500 m. There are at least 5,000 individuals in Josephine and Curry Counties in southwestern Oregon, spread across at least 45 populations. In California, there are 4 known populations, all in Del Norte County. It grows in open woodlands on serpentine soils. Associated species commonly found growing with P. hesperia include the serpentine endemics Pinus jeffreyi and Arctostaphylos viscida.

== Conservation ==
While Packera hesperia enjoys neither state nor federal protections, NatureServe recognizes the species as vulnerable globally. The Oregon Biodiversity Information Center considers P. hesperia vulnerable (S3) in Oregon, and the CNPS Inventory of Rare and Endangered Plants of California lists it as critically imperiled (S1) in California. Compounded by its limited geographic distribution, threats to this species include fire management regimes, mining, and to a lesser extent logging, grazing, and damage by off-road vehicles.
