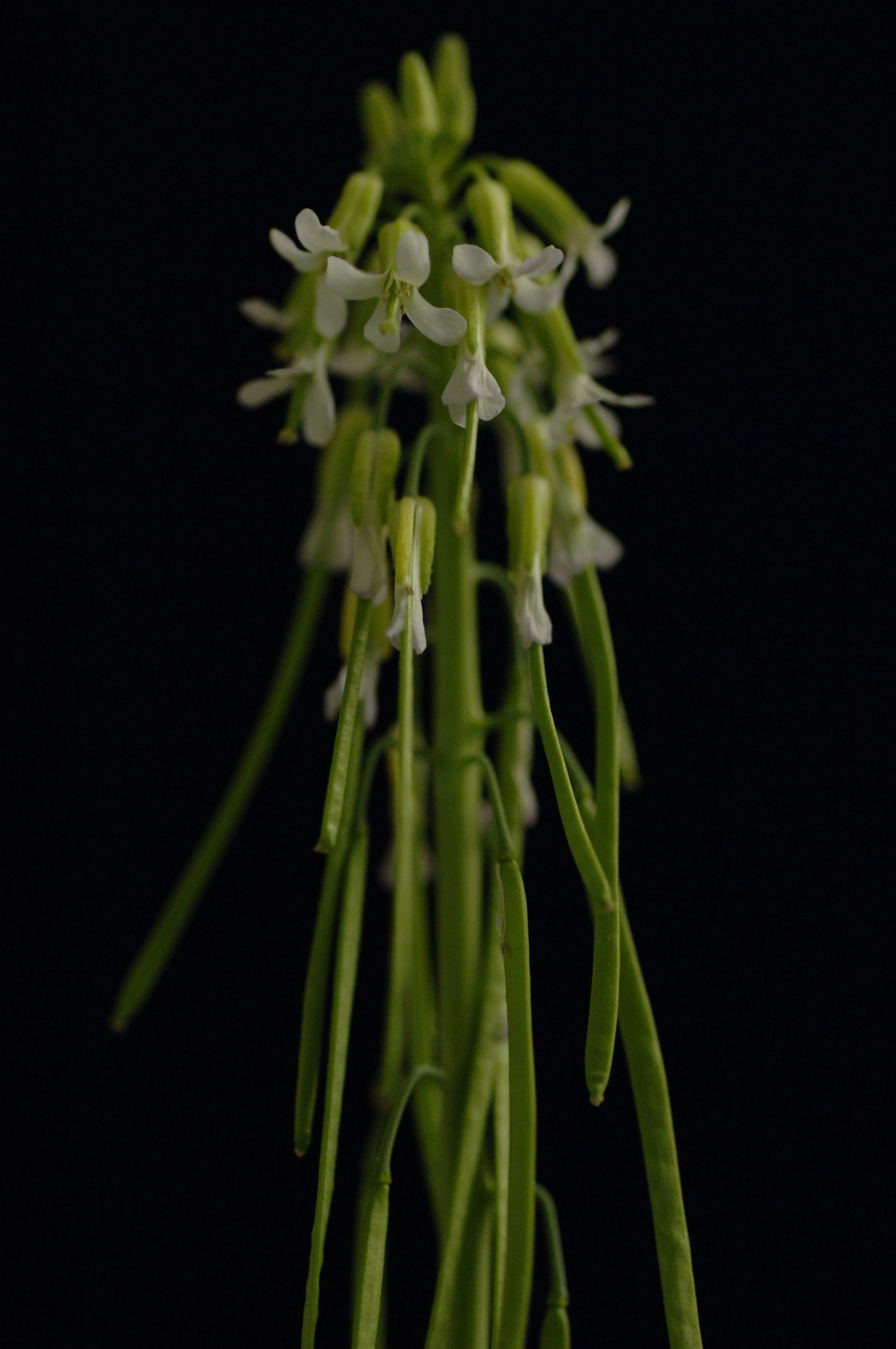

Scientific classification
- Kingdom: Plantae
- Clade: Tracheophytes
- Clade: Angiosperms
- Clade: Eudicots
- Clade: Rosids
- Order: Brassicales
- Family: Brassicaceae
- Genus: Boechera
- Species: B. holboellii

Binomial name
- Boechera holboellii (Hornem.) Á.Löve & D.Löve

Synonyms
- Arabis declinata Schrad.; Arabis heteromalla Schrad.; Arabis holboelliana Trevir.; Arabis holboellii Hornem.; Arabis lilacina Schrad.; Erysimum holboellii (Hornem.) Kuntze; Streptanthus virgatus Nutt.

= Boechera holboellii =

Species of flowering plant

Boechera holboellii, or Holbøll's rockcress, is a species of plant in the family Brassicaceae. Its cytology has been much studied by the Danish botanist Tyge W. Böcher. Circumscription of this species has varied, with earlier works treating it as a widespread, polymorphic species with several varieties, while more recently it has been treated as a much more narrowly defined species from Greenland.

The rust fungus Puccinia monoica infects the plant leading to pseudoflowers, which mimic those of yellow, early spring wildflowers (e.g. buttercups), not only in visible light but also in ultraviolet.

The specific epithet commemorates Carl Peter Holbøll - a Danish civil servant and early explorer of the fauna of Greenland.

== Similar species ==
The type of B. holboellii is diploid, from Greenland. There is some evidence that it might also be present in eastern Canada. It is not clear whether polyploids of B. holboellii (as narrowly defined) exist. The following diploid species have been distinguished:

- B. pendulocarpa, in the mountains of western North America
- B. collinsii, east of the Rocky Mountains
- B. polyantha, from Idaho, Montana, Oregon, Washington
- B. retrofracta, widespread from Ontario to Alaska, California, and Montana
