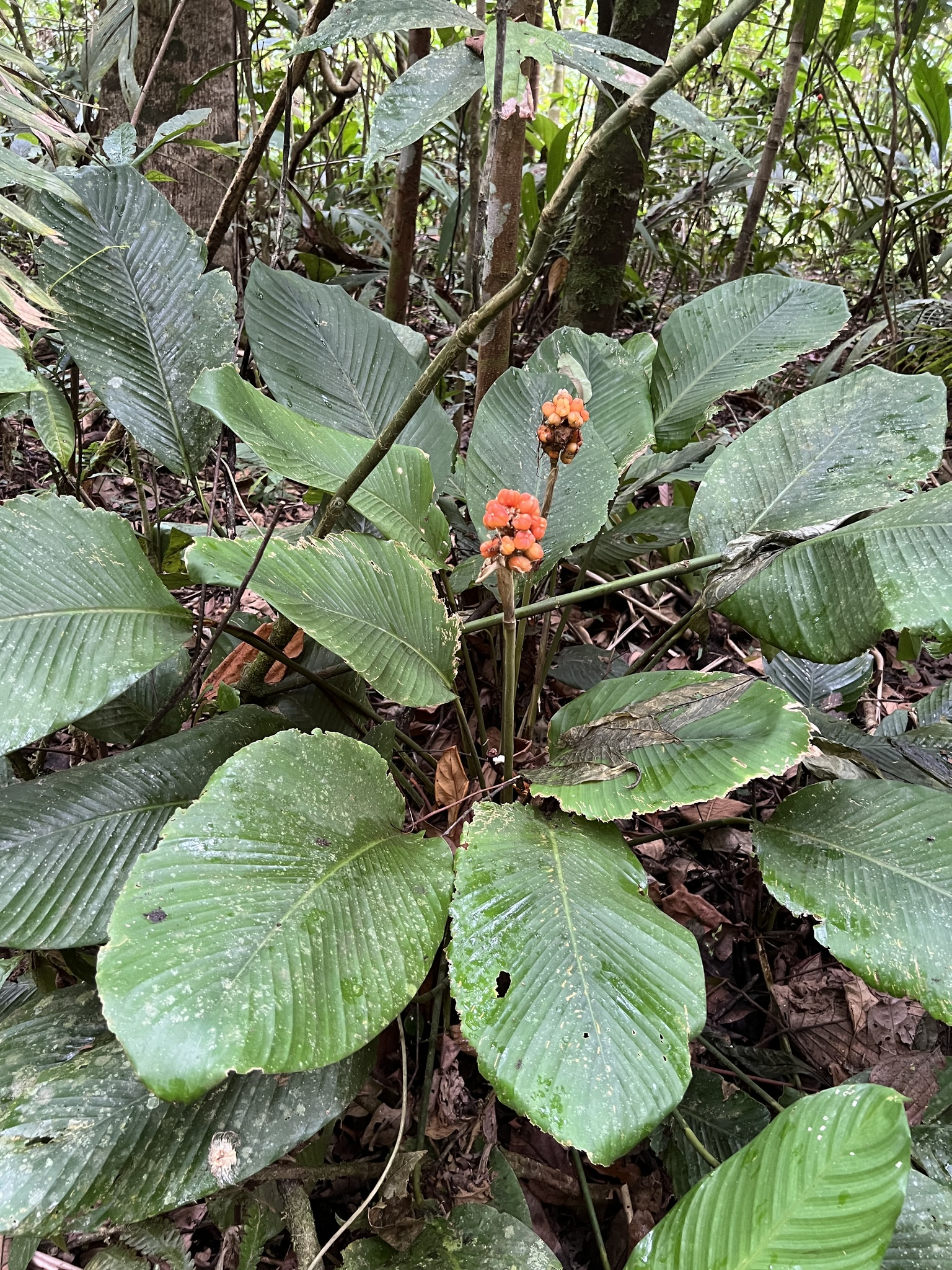

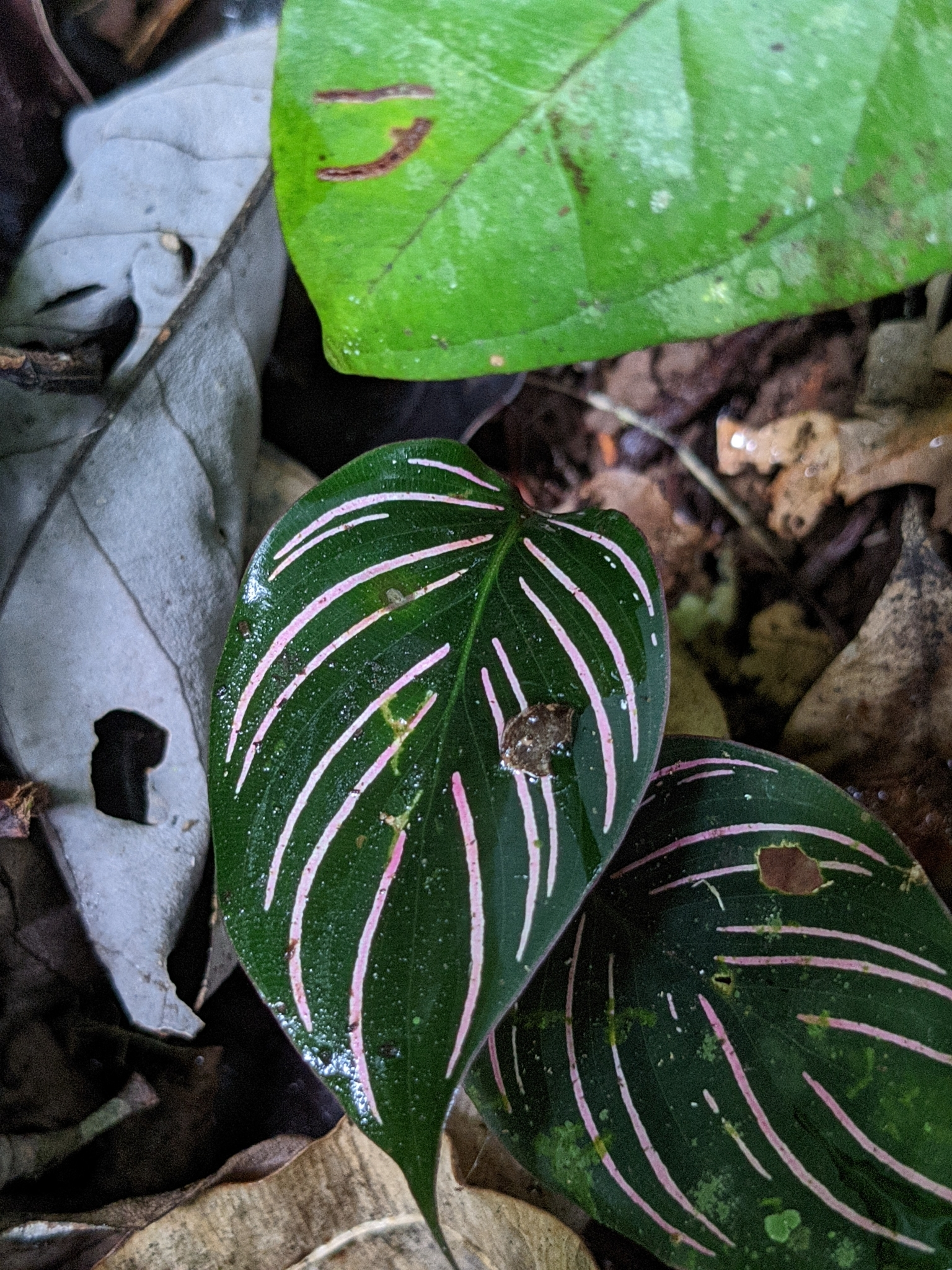

Scientific classification
- Kingdom: Plantae
- Clade: Tracheophytes
- Clade: Angiosperms
- Clade: Monocots
- Clade: Commelinids
- Order: Zingiberales
- Family: Marantaceae
- Genus: Goeppertia
- Species: G. gymnocarpa

Binomial name
- Goeppertia gymnocarpa (H.Kenn.) Borchs. & S.Suárez

Synonyms
- Calathea gymnocarpa H.Kenn.

= Goeppertia gymnocarpa =

Species of flowering plant

Goeppertia gymnocarpa is a species of plant from the Goeppertia genus, in the Marantaceae family which is native to Colombia, Costa Rica, Nicaragua and Panamá. It was discovered by Helen Kennedy as Calathea gymnocarpa in 1977 in Botaniska Notisier (Vol.130). This species belongs to the sub-group of Goeppertia called the Ornata clade.

== Description ==
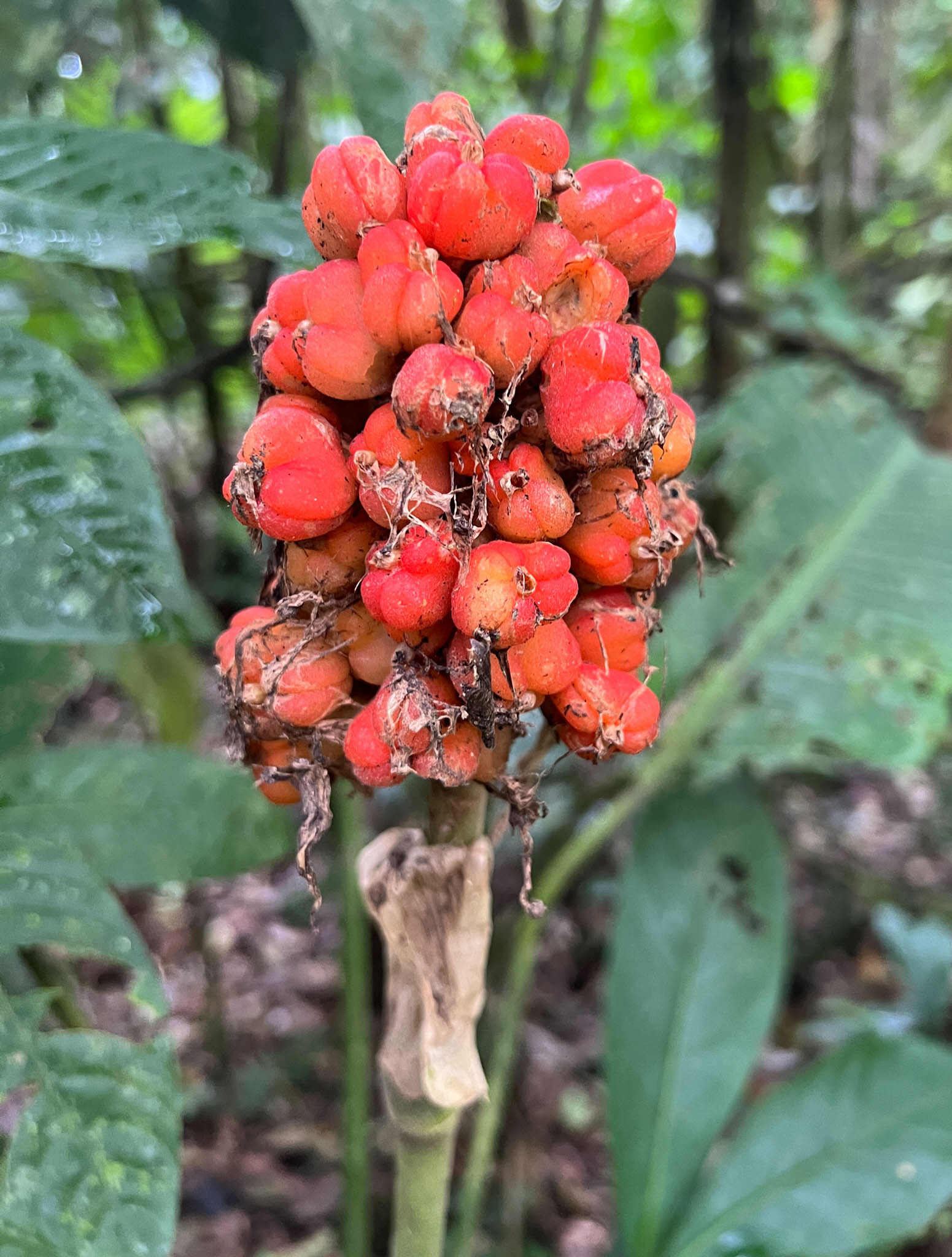
Fruits of Goeppertia gymnocarpa

Goeppertia gymnocarpa is a medium-sized species with large green leaves with short, thick petioles and a long, green pulvinus. G.gymnocarpa often goes to a unique transition of leaf pattern: the juvenile leaves have pink lines above which makes it part of the Ornata group. The pink lines slowly fades as the plant goes through a transition from the pink lines to a new brush pattern. The brush pattern consists of two broad, longitudinal, yellowish-green bands on each side of the leaf. The pattern often disappear completely, but some specimen do retain the brush pattern even when mature. The inflorescence of G. gymnocarpa consists of multiple small creamy-yellow bracts around a very thick, short green peduncle. The flowers are white with a yellowish center. The fruits make this species easy to identify because of their intense red capsule around the naked peduncle.
