= Turesson =

Turesson is a Swedish surname and a patronymic. Notable people with the name include:

- Erik Turesson Bielke, Swedish noble
- Göte Turesson (1892–1970), Swedish botanist
- Nils Turesson Bielke (1569–1639), Swedish statesman
- Tom Turesson (1942–2004), Swedish footballer and manager
- Ture Turesson (Bielke), Swedish statesman and military commander
