= Sisyrinchium groenlandicum =

Scientific classification
- Kingdom: Plantae
- Clade: Tracheophytes
- Clade: Angiosperms
- Clade: Monocots
- Order: Asparagales
- Family: Iridaceae
- Genus: Sisyrinchium
- Species: S. groenlandicum

Binomial name
- Sisyrinchium groenlandicum Böcher

Species of flowering plant

Sisyrinchium groenlandicum, commonly known as Greenland blue-eyed grass, is a perennial cespitose herb native and endemic to Greenland. It has simple purplish tinged 1–2 mm wide stems and glabrous grass-like leaves and 10–13 mm wide pale blue flowers. It is only known from the areas of Nuup Kangerlua, Ameralik and previously Kangerslussuaq.

== Description ==
The leaves of this 12–30 cm high perennial herb are glabrous 1-1.8 mm broad and similar to those of grasses. The stems is 1–2 mm wide and sometimes with purplish tinge.

Flowers consists of two sets of tepal, the outer most are 5.7–10.3 mm with rounded apex. Innermost tepals are pale blue to whitish.

== Distribution and habitat ==
Greenland blue-eyed grass is endemic to Greenland and only found in a very limited area around Kapisillit in the Nuup Kangerslua area. In 1948 was found in Kangerlusssuaq, but despite dedicated searching in 1979 have not been found here since.

Greenland blue-eyed grass has been found on warm, sunny, steep, dry southerly exposed slopes.
