= Joe Hin Tjio =

Indonesian geneticist (1919–2001)

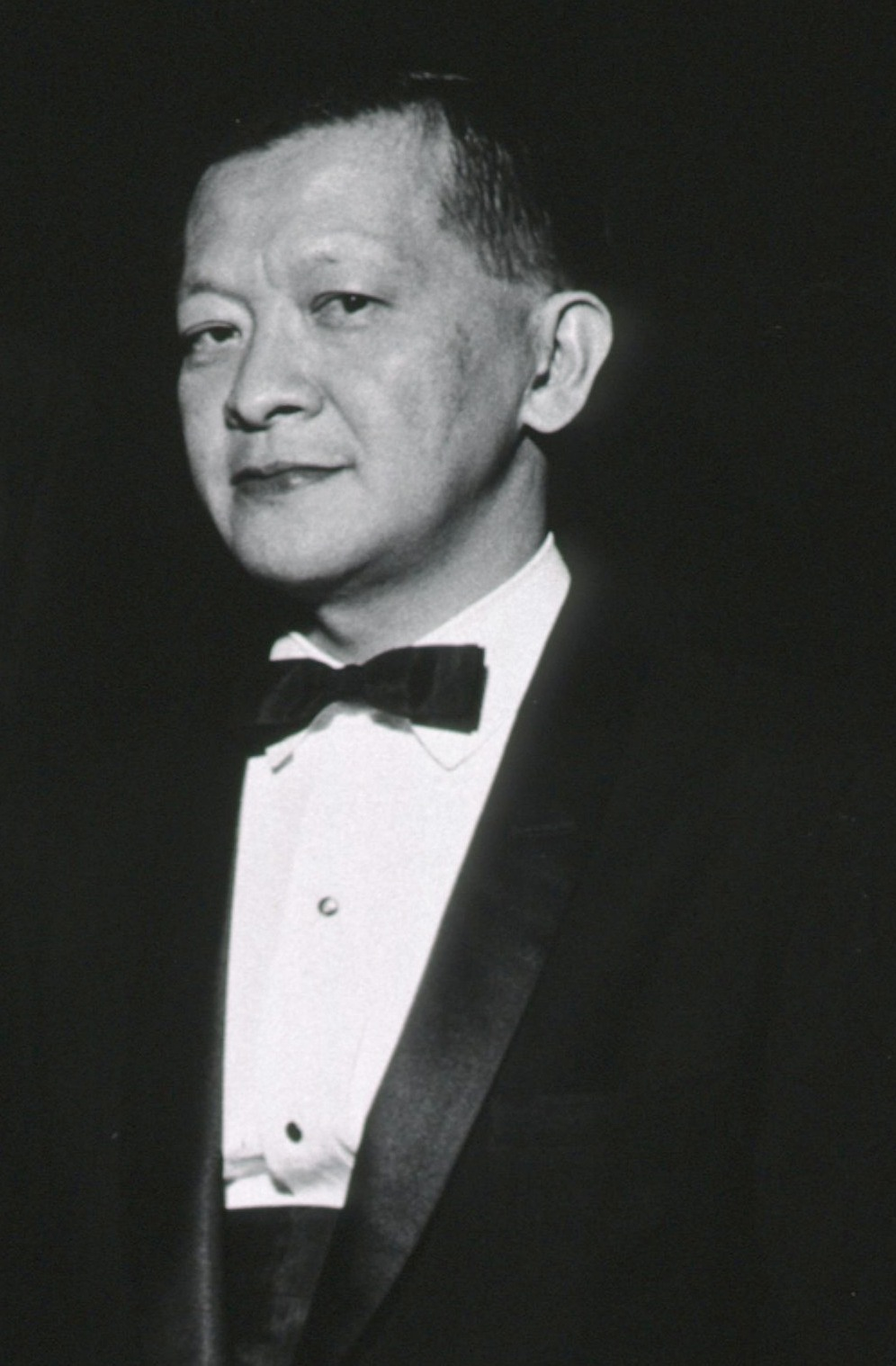
- Born: 2 November 1919; Pacalongan, Dutch East Indies
- Died: 27 November 2001 (aged 82); Gaithersburg, Maryland, U.S
- Education: Bogor Institute of Agriculture
- Spouse: Inga Bjorg Arna Bildsfell
- Children: 1 son
- Awards: International Prize Award by Joseph P. Kennedy Jr. Foundation
- Scientific career
- Fields: Cytogenetics
- Workplaces: National Institute of Health

Joe Hin Tjio
- Traditional Chinese: 蔣有興
- Simplified Chinese: 蒋有兴
Transcriptions
Standard Mandarin
- Hanyu Pinyin: Jiǎng Yǒuxìng
Southern Min
- Hokkien POJ: Chiúⁿ Iú-hing
- Tâi-lô: Tsiúnn Iú-hing

Joe Hin Tjio (/ˈtʃiːoʊ/; 2 November 1919 – 27 November 2001), was an Indonesian-born American cytogeneticist. He was renowned as the first person to recognize that the normal number of human chromosomes is 46, 23 pairs. He discovered this on 22 December 1955 at the Institute of Genetics of the University of Lund in Sweden, where he was a visiting scientist.

== Early life ==
Tjio was born to Indonesian parents of Chinese origin in Pekalongan, Java, then part of the Dutch East Indies and later known as Indonesia. His father was a photographer. Tjio was educated in Dutch colonial schools, trained in agronomy in college, and did research on potato breeding. He was imprisoned for 3 years and tortured by the Japanese in a concentration camp during World War II.

== Career ==
After the war ended, Tjio went to the Netherlands, whose government provided him with a fellowship for study in Europe. He worked in plant breeding in Denmark, Spain and Sweden. From 1948 to 1959 he did plant chromosome research in Zaragoza in Spain and spent his summers in Sweden working with Professor Albert Levan in Lund.

In 1953, a lab mistake involving mixing HeLa cells with the wrong liquid led Tjio and Levan to develop better techniques for staining and counting chromosomes. It allowed researchers for the first time to see and count each chromosome clearly in the HeLa cells with which they were working. They were the first to show that humans have 23 pairs of chromosomes rather than 24, as was previously believed. This was important for the study of developmental disorders, such as Down syndrome, that involve the number of chromosomes. Tjio made his discovery of the correct human chromosome count (46 chromosomes, rather than 48 as counted in 1921 by Theophilus Painter) in 1955 and the findings were published (with Levan as his co-author) in the Scandinavian journal Hereditas on 26 January 1956.

In 1958 Tjio went to the United States and in 1959 he joined the staff of the National Institutes of Health in Bethesda, Maryland. He received his Ph.D. in biophysics and cytogenetics from the University of Colorado Denver. He spent the balance of his career at the NIH in human chromosome research. He was named scientist emeritus in 1992, but maintained a laboratory for the next five years. In 1997, he retired to Gaithersburg, Maryland where he died in 2001 aged 82.

== Works ==
- Tjio JH, Levan A. The chromosome number of man. Hereditas volume 42: pages 1–6, 1956.
