= Ecography =

- Discipline: Ecology
- Language: English
- Edited by: Miguel Araújo

Publication details
- Former name: Holarctic Ecology
- History: 1978-present
- Publisher: Wiley-Blackwell
- Frequency: Monthly
- Impact factor: 5.9 (2022)

Standard abbreviations
- ISO 4: Ecography

Indexing
- CODEN: ECOGEG
- ISSN: 0906-7590
- LCCN: 92641619
- JSTOR: 09067590
- OCLC no.: 50102682

Links
- Journal homepage; Online access

Ecography is a monthly peer-reviewed scientific journal published by Wiley on behalf of the Nordic Society Oikos covering the field of spatial ecology. It has been published since 1978, the first 14 volumes under the name Holarctic Ecology.

Ecography is published in collaboration with Oikos, Journal of Avian Biology, Nordic Journal of Botany, Lindbergia and Wildlife Biology. It is available as an open-access publication via Wiley.

According to the Journal Citation Reports, the journal has an impact factor of 5.9 as of 2022, ranking it 7th out of 65 journals in the category "Biodiversity Conservation" and 18th out of 174 journals in the category "Ecology".

== Scope ==
The journal covers the following fields:

- population ecology and community ecology
- macroecology
- biogeography
- ecological conservation
