= Göte Turesson =

Swedish botanist (1892–1970)

Göte Wilhelm Turesson
- Born: 6 April 1892; Malmö, Sweden
- Died: 30 December 1970 (aged 78)
- Education: University of Washington, Lund University
- Known for: ecotype, genecology
- Awards: Darwin-Wallace Medal (Silver, 1958)
- Scientific career
- Fields: ecological genetics, plant evolution
- Workplaces: Swedish University of Agricultural Sciences

Göte Wilhelm Turesson (6 April 1892 – 30 December 1970) was a Swedish evolutionary botanist who made significant contributions to ecological genetics, and coined the terms ecotype and agamospecies. He conducted extensive work to demonstrate that there is a genetic basis to the differentiation of plant populations. This work stood in sharp contrast to most researchers at the time, who believed that the differentiation of plant populations was due to phenotypic plasticity. Further, Turesson came to the conclusion that differentiation of plant populations was largely driven by natural selection. His work on locally adapted plant populations led him to coin the term "ecotype" in 1922.

== Life ==
Turesson was born in Malmö to schoolmaster Jöns Turesson and wife Sofie née Nilsson. He completed his initial science studies in the United States at the University of Washington, obtaining his B.S. in 1914 and M.S. in 1915. He returned to Sweden, receiving his PhD from Lund University in 1923. He was a lecturer at Lund until 1927, eventually taking a position as professor of systematic botany and genetics at the Agricultural College at Ultuna outside Uppsala (since 1977 the main campus of the Swedish University of Agricultural Sciences), where he remained from 1935 to 1958.

== Awards ==
Honorary member of the Botanical Society of Edinburgh 1934, Lund Botanical Society 1953, Genetics Society of Japan 1958 and the Mendelian Society in Lund 1960. Corresponding member of the Societas zoologica-botanica Fennica Vanamo 1945. He was elected member of the Royal Physiographic Society in Lund 1939, the Royal Swedish Academy of Agriculture and Forestry 1945, the Royal Society of Sciences in Uppsala 1945 and doctor honoris cause at Agricultural College upon his retirement in 1957. He was awarded the honorary medal of Christian X of Denmark. He was awarded the Linnean Society of London's prestigious Darwin-Wallace Medal in 1958.

== Legacy ==
Turesson's ideas and findings have had a lasting effect on evolutionary biology of plants. At the main campus of the Swedish University of Agricultural Sciences in Ultuna, one may still see a long row of birch trees of provenances ranging from Scania to Lappland, planted by Turesson. Spectacularly, bud burst in spring starts in the end of the southern provenances and proceeds 'northwards', while autumn leaf colouring and senescence starts in the northern provenances and proceeds 'southwards'. Thus, Turesson continues to remind SLU students that phenology has a genetic basis and that local adaption may be revealed in common garden experiments.

== Selected bibliography ==
- Turesson, G. (1914). Slope exposure as a factor in the distribution of Pseudotsuga taxifolia in arid parts of Washington. Bulletin of the Torrey Botanical Club 41 (6): 337-345.
- Turesson, G. (1922a). The species and variety as ecological units. Hereditas 3: 100-113.
- Turesson, G. (1922b). The genotypical response of the plant species to the habitat. Hereditas 3: 211-350.
- Turesson, G. (1925). The plant species in relation to habitat and climate. Hereditas 6: 147-236.
