= Journal of Avian Biology =

- Discipline: Ornithology
- Language: English
- Edited by: Staffan Bensch, Jan-Åke Nilsson

Publication details
- Former name(s): Ornis Scandinavica
- History: 1970–present
- Publisher: Wiley-Blackwell on behalf of the Nordic Society Oikos
- Frequency: Bimonthly
- Impact factor: 2.248 (2021)

Standard abbreviations
- ISO 4: J. Avian Biol.

Indexing
- CODEN: JAVBE9
- ISSN: 0908-8857 (print); 1600-048X (web)
- LCCN: 94657491
- OCLC no.: 30066747

Links
- Journal homepage; Online access; Online archive

The Journal of Avian Biology is a bimonthly peer-reviewed scientific journal of ornithology published by Wiley on behalf of the Nordic Society Oikos (NSO) in collaboration with Oikos, Nordic Journal of Botany, Wildlife Biology, Lindbergia and Ecography.

The editors-in-chief are Staffan Bensch and Jan-Åke Nilsson. The journal was established in 1970 as Ornis Scandinavica and appeared quarterly. It obtained its current name in 1994, changed to bimonthly publication in 2004, continuous monthly publication in 2018, and back to bimonthly publication in 2022.

The journal only publishes fully open access (since 2022).

According to the Journal Citation Reports, the journal has a 2021 impact factor of 2.248, ranking it fifth out of 31 journals in the category "Ornithology".

== See also ==
- List of ornithology journals
