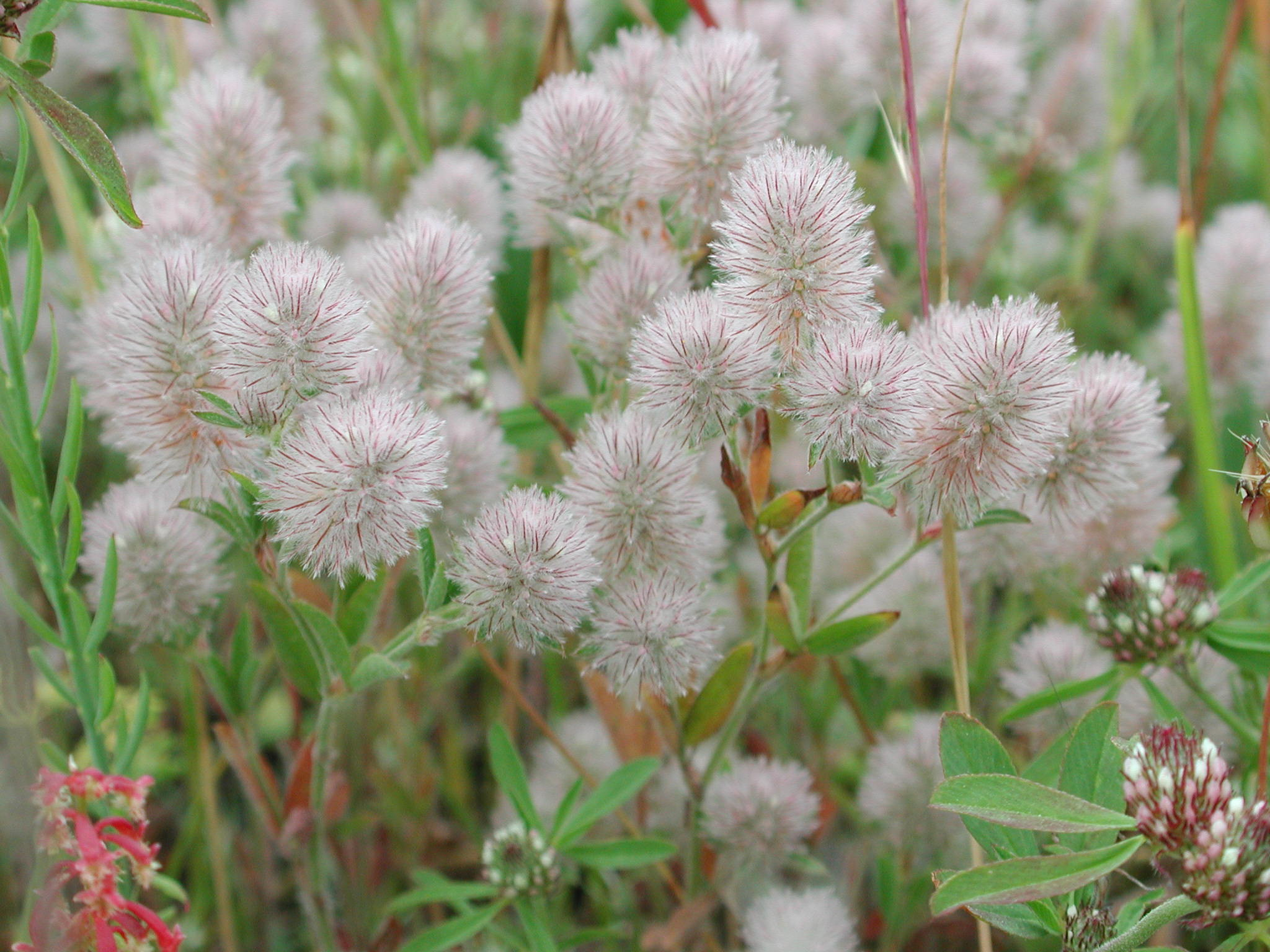

Scientific classification
- Kingdom: Plantae
- Clade: Embryophytes
- Clade: Tracheophytes
- Clade: Spermatophytes
- Clade: Angiosperms
- Clade: Eudicots
- Clade: Rosids
- Order: Fabales
- Family: Fabaceae
- Subfamily: Faboideae
- Genus: Trifolium
- Species: T. arvense

Binomial name
- Trifolium arvense L.

= Trifolium arvense =

Species of flowering plant

Trifolium arvense, commonly known as the hare's-foot clover, rabbitfoot clover, stone clover or oldfield clover, is a flowering plant in the bean family, Fabaceae. It is native to Europe.

== Description ==
Trifolium arvense is a small erect herbaceous annual or biennial plant, growing to 10–40 centimetres (4–15 1/2 in) tall. Like all clovers, its leaves are trifoliate, divided into three slender, sessile leaflets 1–2 cm (1/2–3/4 in) long and 3–5 millimetres (1/8–1/4 in) broad, sometimes edged with small hairs and finely serrated. The leaves have a pair of stipules at the base, often tipped in red.

The flowers are grouped in a dense inflorescence 2–3 cm long and 1–1.5 cm broad. Each flower is 4–5 mm long, rosy white in colour, and especially characterised by the many silky white hairs which tip the five sepals, which are much larger than the petals. These hairs, along with the more or less oblong form of the inflorescence, are the inspiration for the common name. Pollination is carried out by bees, or via autogamy, since the plant is hermaphroditic, and the flowering season is from mid-spring to late summer. The fruit is a small pod containing a single seed.

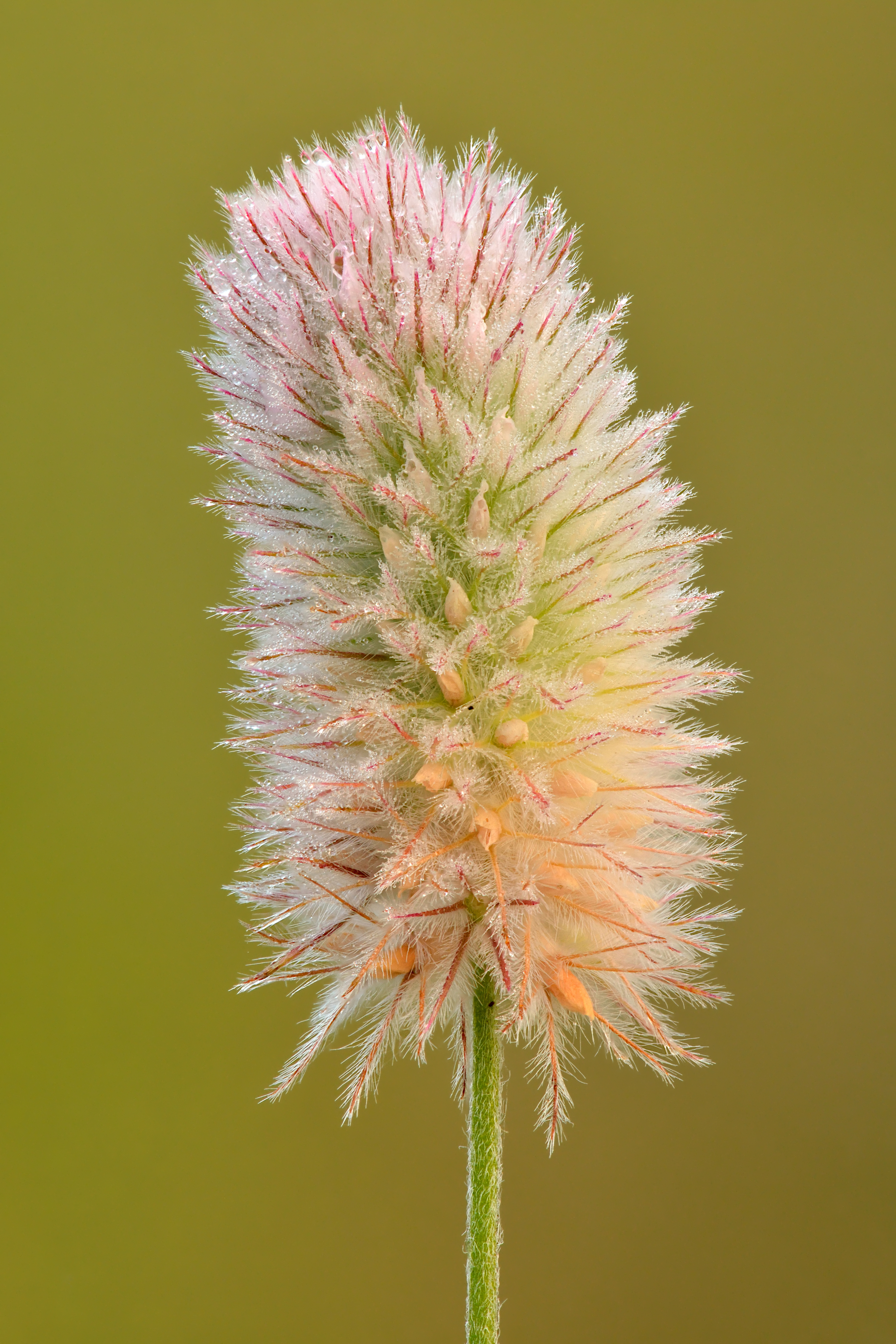
Inflorescence

=== Reproduction ===
Trifolium arvense flowers in early summer and does not require a cold period to induce flowering. Larger plants in good condition may flower for a longer period. In wild populations, only plants that are large enough (dry weight >0.01g) tend to produce seeds. The flowers are self-fertilized, but visits by bees provide some opportunity for cross-fertilization. The seeds are covered by a hard coat which enables them to survive for a long period without germinating unless damaged.

== Etymology ==
The Latin specific epithet arvense means "of the fields", or "agricultural".

== Distribution and habitat ==
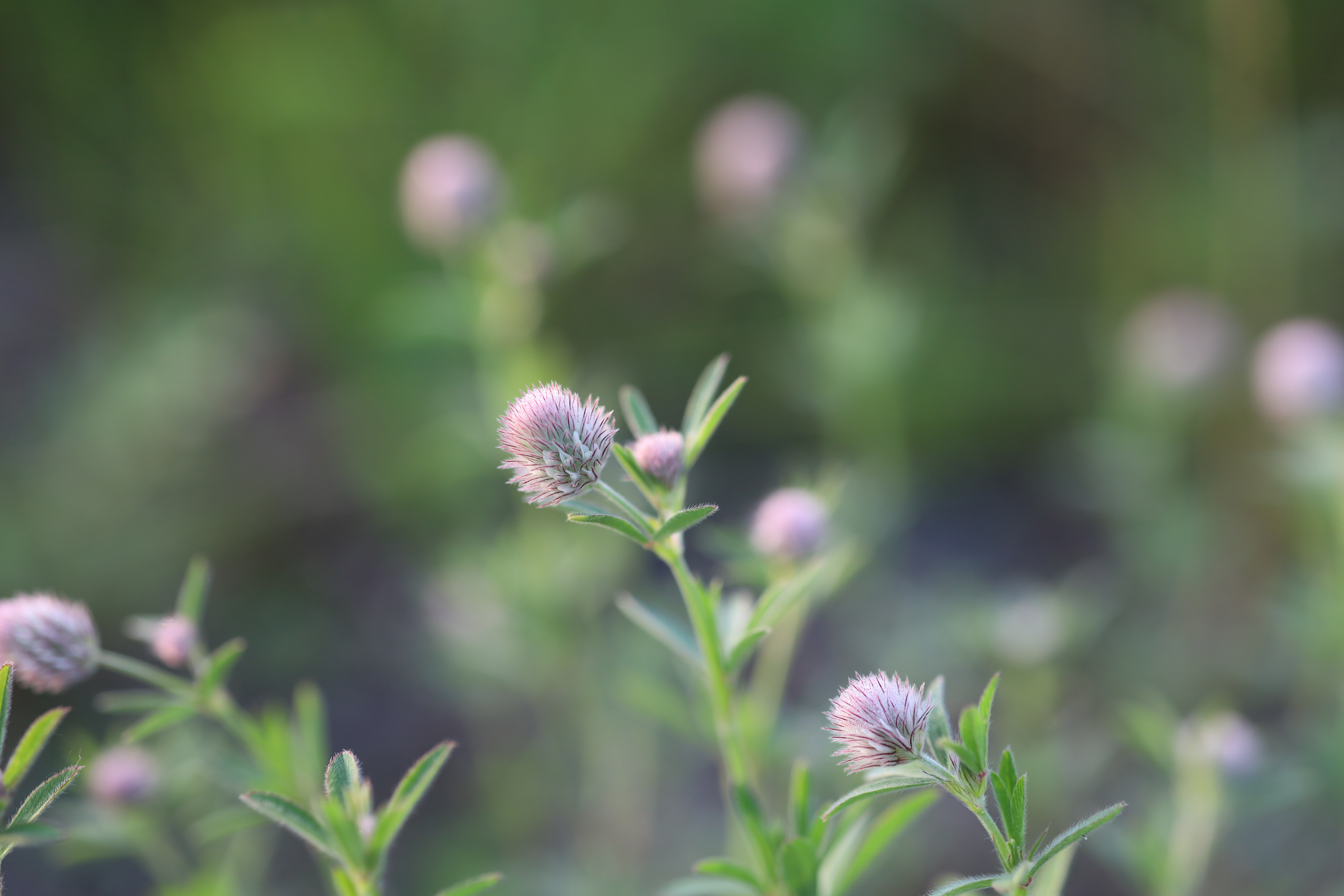
T. arvense, Quebec, Canada

Trifolium arvense is native to Europe, excluding the Arctic zone and western Asia, in plain or mid-mountain habitats up to 1,600 metres (5,200 ft) altitude. It has been introduced to North America, where it now appears throughout the eastern United States, southern Canada, and the western part of the U.S. along the Pacific Coast. The plant has also been recorded in some parts of Hawaii.

It grows in dry sandy soils, both acidic and alkaline, soil with dry-mesic conditions. It is typically found at the edge of fields, in wastelands, at the side of roads, on sand dunes, and opportunistically in vineyards and orchards when they are not irrigated.

== Ecology ==
Trifolium arvense is grazed by rabbits, wild turkey, deer, sheep, and goats.

Like most legumes, it fixes nitrogen, making it valued on low-fertility soils for nitrogen it provides to other crops. This ability depends on the size of nodule attach in the root system of legume. The sizes of nodule showing the positive correlation with the composition of community of microorganisms which are responsible for nitrogen fixing. In semi-arid areas, the percentage of nitrogen originate from the atmosphere in total amount of nitrogen fixation done by T. arvense has been maintained at a high level range which refers to 82–91%. In a rainy season, the total quantity of nitrogen fixed by the species is larger than in a dry season.

=== Management ===
Being part of Fabaceae, T. arvense is managed similarly to other weeds in the family. Trifolium arvense can be easily controlled in small scale field like home garden by hand-pulling, cultivation or using mulch. But when it comes to farm or landscape of wide field, due to the seeds of T. arvense are highly tolerant of extreme temperature as well as physical damage because of their tiny size, long-term efforts of fighting against Trifolium arvense is required. Tillage and composting would not work well in this situation compared to other kinds of weeds. Chemical application is needed to assist to remove T. arvense. Once the weedy situation is under control, changing the cultural practice and turfgrass is necessary to avoid them to emerge again. In addition, increasing the amount of nitrogen and decreasing the amount of phosphorus contained in fertilizer used can be effective in removing family Fabaceae weeds and other weeds as well.

== Potential toxicity ==
Due to the hairy flowers, overconsumption by horses or other livestock can cause potentially fatal abdominal obstruction. The plant is characteristic of those with allergenic effects on humans, but is considered mild.

== Potential uses ==
The plant reportedly has medicinal value for humans and animals.

By 2010, scientists at AgResearch in New Zealand used genetic modification to take a single gene from T. arvense and put it into T. repens (white clover). The genetically modified clover could reduce bloating in livestock and decrease methane emissions.
