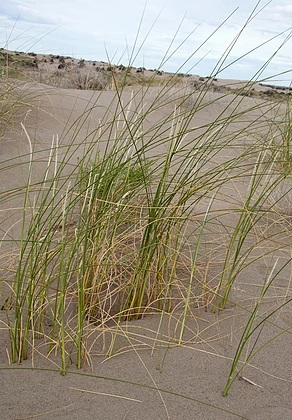

Scientific classification
- Kingdom: Plantae
- Clade: Tracheophytes
- Clade: Angiosperms
- Clade: Monocots
- Clade: Commelinids
- Order: Poales
- Family: Poaceae
- Subfamily: Chloridoideae
- Genus: Sporobolus
- Species: S. rigens

Binomial name
- Sporobolus rigens (Trin.) É.Desv.

= Sporobolus rigens =

Species of grass

Sporobolus rigens is a species of grass in the family Poaceae.

It is native to Argentina.
