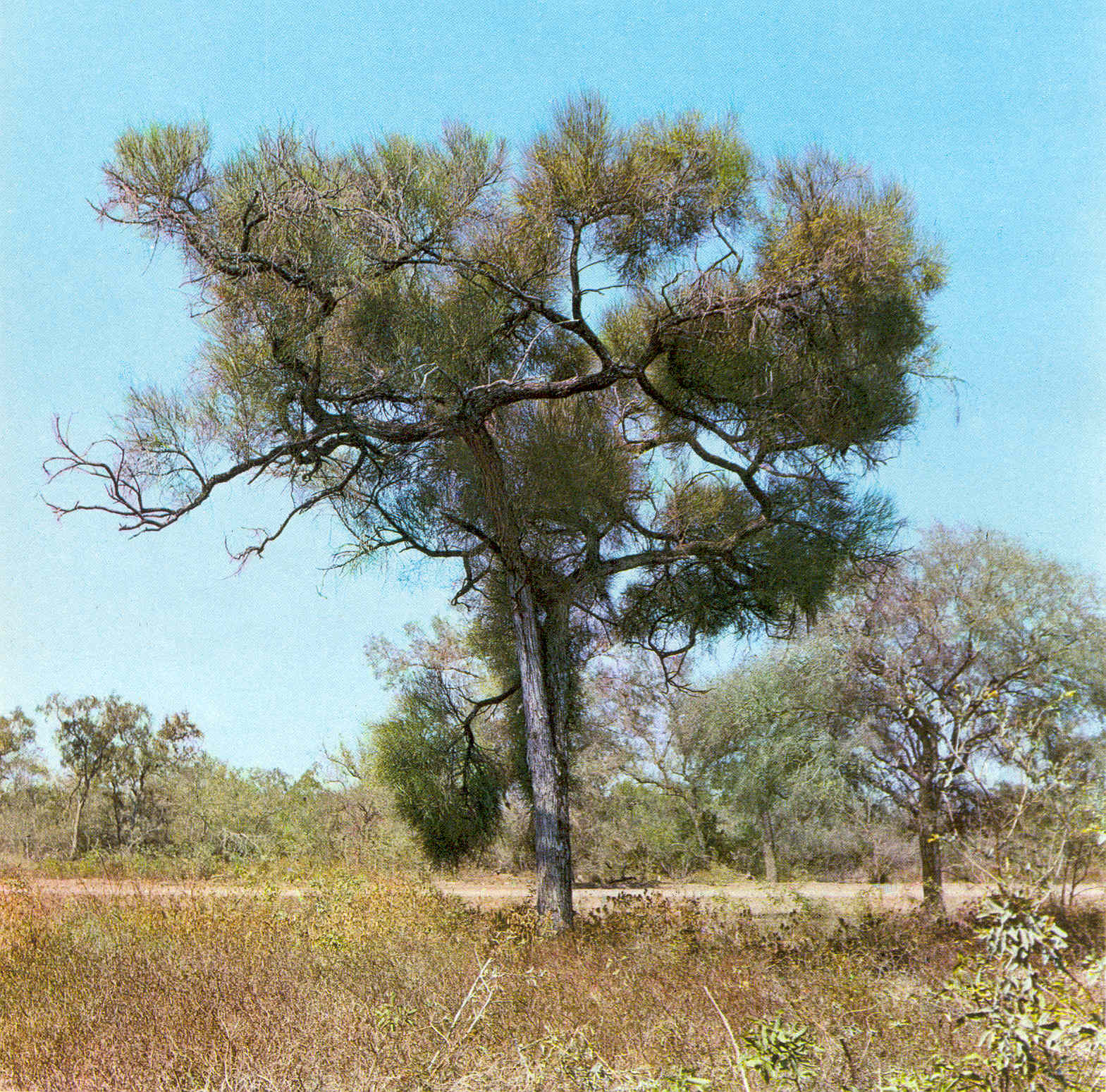

Conservation status
- Least Concern (IUCN 3.1)

Scientific classification
- Kingdom: Plantae
- Clade: Tracheophytes
- Clade: Angiosperms
- Clade: Eudicots
- Clade: Rosids
- Order: Fabales
- Family: Fabaceae
- Subfamily: Caesalpinioideae
- Clade: Mimosoid clade
- Genus: Neltuma
- Species: N. kuntzei

Binomial name
- Neltuma kuntzei (Harms) C.E.Hughes & G.P.Lewis

Synonyms
- Prosopis kuntzei; Prosopis casadensis

= Neltuma kuntzei =

Species of legume

Neltuma kuntzei (formerly Prosopis kuntzei) is a South American leguminous tree species that inhabits the westernmost Gran Chaco forests covering areas of Argentina, Bolivia, and Paraguay. It has also been able to colonize the nearby pasture sabanas. It is commonly referred to as itín, palo mataco, carandá or barba de tigre. It is adapted to arid climate, but can also survive flooded ground for a long time.

== Morphology ==
It is a smooth tree, 4 to 10 meters high. Its trunk measures 40 to 60 cm in diameter and is highly branched and rigid, presenting uncountable spines. Leaves are small (3–5 mm long), bipinnate, tending to fall very early in spring after young sprouts become spines themselves. Inflorescence consists of lonely appearing racemes 3–7 cm long. Flowers are white-yellowish, scented, and 3 mm long. The fruit is a dehiscent dark violet pod, 10–17 cm long, straight shaped and heavily scented. It contains a starchy paste inside. Seeds are flat, egg-shaped of chestnut colour. They measure 7-1 0 mm long and 5–6 mm wide. Wide new sprouts come out between July and November.

This tree flowers between September and November and fructifies between December and January, holding its fruits until early August.

The sapwood is light yellow, while the heartwood is chestnut brown with patches of dark violet. The wood has a fine texture and straight to wavy to interlocked grain. When first chopped it is very scented. This species wood is one of the densest and notably most durable of the genus.

== Usage ==
Because of its technological wood properties, Neltuma kuntzei is considered an important Fabaceae species. However timber is available in small sizes and limited amounts, therefore it is used rather locally to manufacture crafts like statues, handles, wooden wheel parts, musical instruments and staffs. Due to its almost black colour, and remarkable hardness, it can be used as substitute of ebony.
