= Svensk Botanisk Tidskrift =

Svensk Botanisk Tidskrift is a peer-reviewed scientific journal on botany published by the Svenska Botaniska Föreningen since 1907. It is published five times a year. It is abstracted and indexed in BIOSIS Previews and Scopus.
