= Arctic vegetation =

Plants adapted to the short, cold growing seasons of the Arctic regions

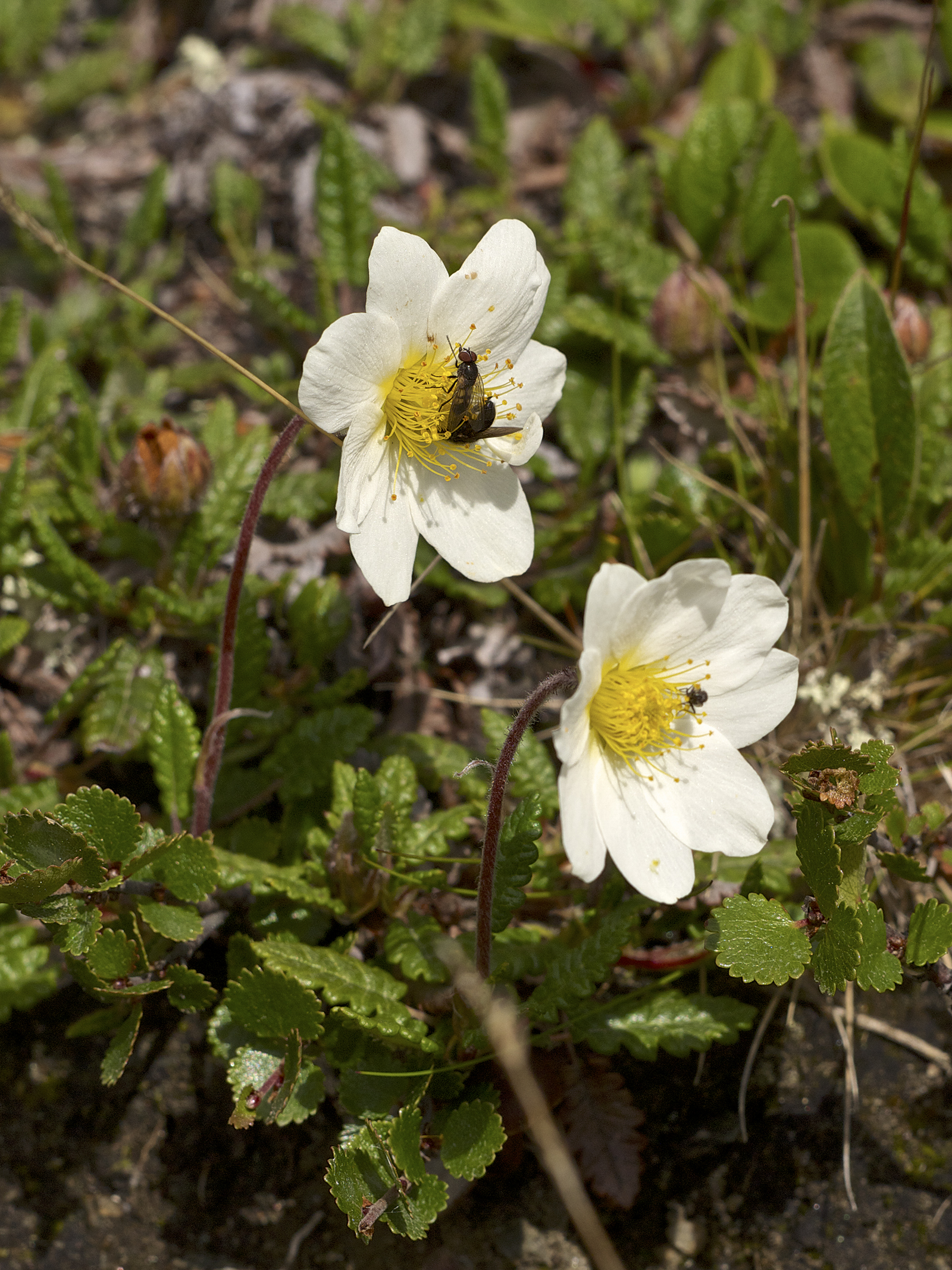
Dryas octopetala is a common plant in the Arctic

About 1,702 species of plants live on the Arctic tundra, including flowering plants, short shrubs, herbs, grasses, and mosses. These plants are adapted to short, cold growing seasons. They have the ability to withstand extremely cold temperatures in the winter (winter hardiness), and grow and reproduce in summer conditions that are quite limiting.

As of 2005, arctic vegetation covered approximately 5×10^{6} km^{2} (1.9×10^{6} sq mi) of land. The area of Arctic vegetation decreased by approximately 1.4×10^{6} km^{2} (0.54×10^{6} sq mi) from 1980 to 2000, with a corresponding increase in the boreal forest (taiga). This decrease is linked to the warming of the Arctic due to climate change.

== Adaptations ==
Arctic plants have a number of adaptations to the compressed growing season and low temperatures:

- They initiate growth rapidly in the spring, and flower and set seed much sooner than plants that grow in warmer conditions.
- Their peak metabolic rate occurs at a much lower temperature than plants from farther south, but only peaks for a short growing season.

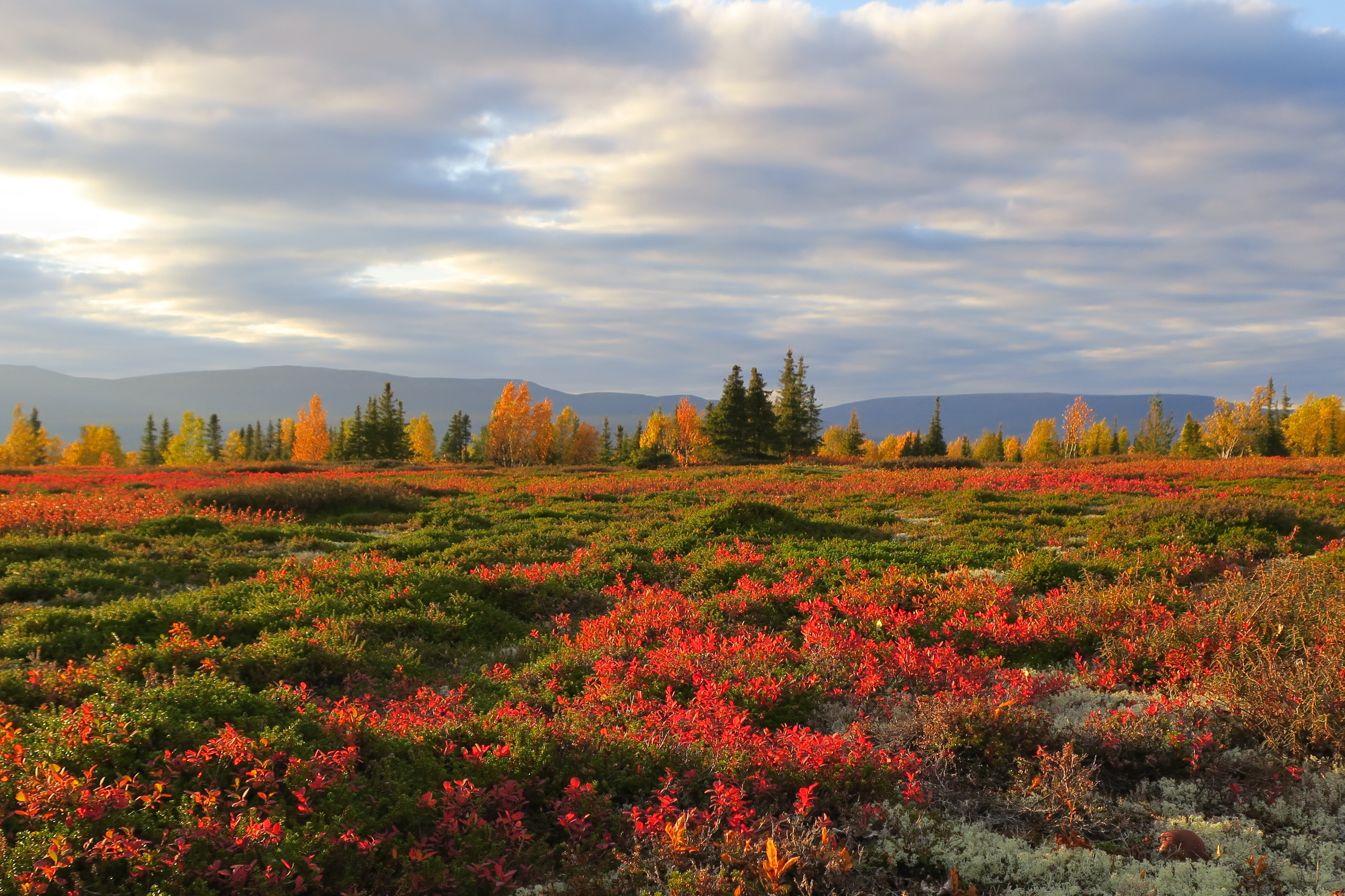
During Autumn, Arctic vegetation often undergoes vivid colour transformation.

- Some Arctic plants grow close to the ground as cushion plants, which keep the plants close to the warm soil and shield the tender central growing shoot.
- Arctic plants limit their height to be below the snow level. Plants that protrude above the snow are subject to strong winds, blowing snow, and being eaten by caribou, muskox, or ptarmigan.
- Arctic plants can survive very low temperatures because of high concentration of soluble carbohydrates, such as raffinose.
- Reproduction by vegetative propagation is common.

Mosses and lichens are common in the Arctic. These organisms have the ability to stop growth at any time and resume it promptly when conditions improve. They can even survive being covered by snow and ice for over a year. Lichens are quite sensitive to caribou and reindeer grazing, competition from other plants, fires, and contaminants.

== Effect of climate ==
Arctic vegetation is largely controlled by the mean temperature in July, the warmest month. Arctic vegetation occurs in the tundra climate, where trees cannot grow. Tundra climate has two boundaries: the snow line, where permanent year-round snow and ice are on the ground, and the tree line, where the climate becomes warm enough for trees to grow. The snow line occurs when all monthly mean temperatures are below 0 °C (32 °F). The formula used for the tree line has changed over time: under the Köppen climate classification, the treeline occurs when the July temperature is 10 °C (50 °F). Otto Nordenskjöld proposed that the warmest month must be at 9-0.1 T in Celsius, where T is the temperature of the coldest month. In 1947, Holdridge proposed computing the average of all months whose mean temperature are above zero: the treeline would occur when that average is 3 °C (37 °F).

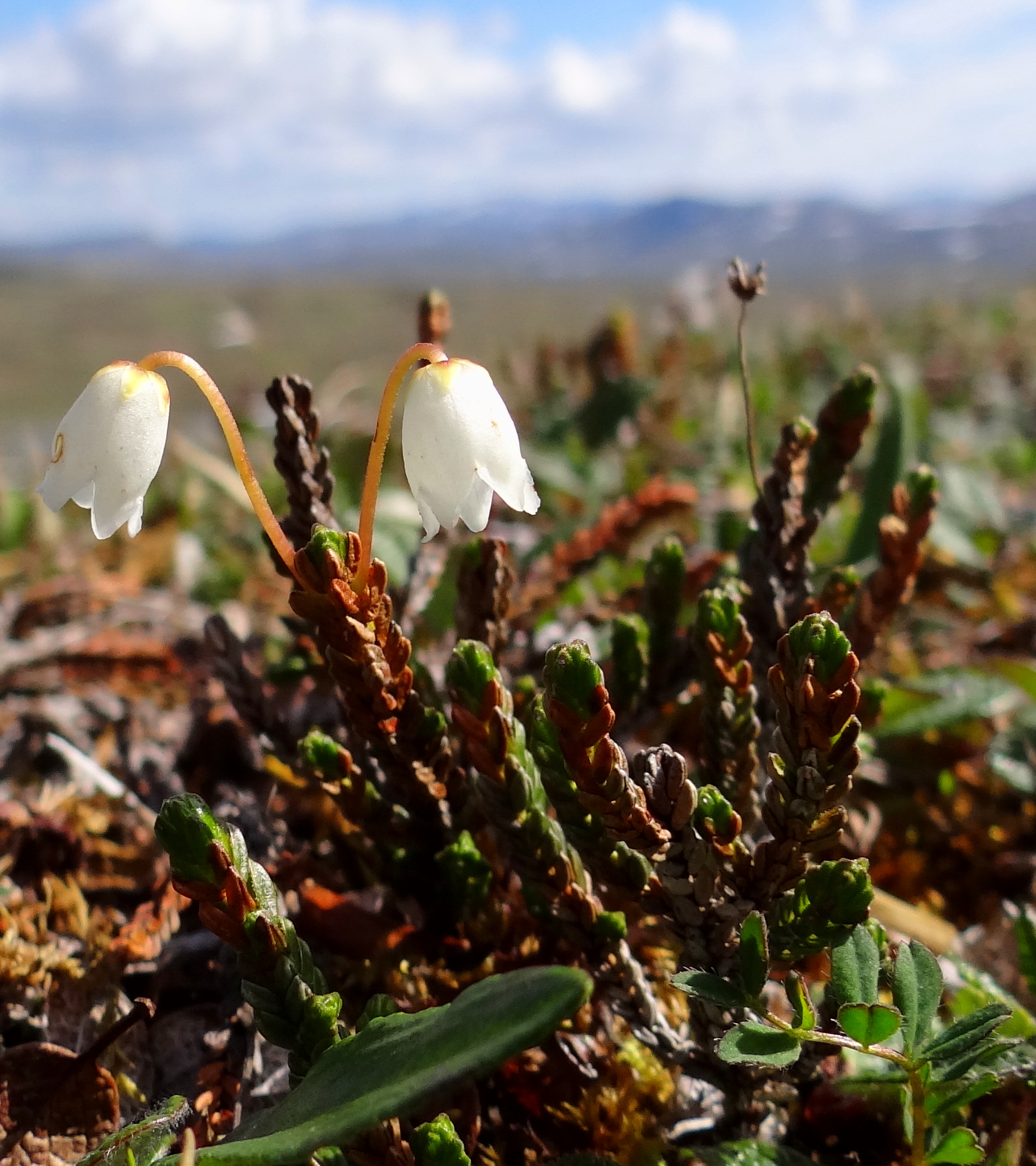
Arctic Bell-heather (Cassiope tetragona) is common when the mean July temperature is near 6 °C (43 °F).

The July mean temperature is close to 0 °C (32 °F) in the coldest areas where Arctic vegetation can grow. At these temperatures, plants are at their metabolic limits, and small differences in the total amount of summer warmth make large difference in the amount of energy available for maintenance, growth and reproduction. As one goes for north to south, the size, horizontal cover, abundance, productivity and variety of plants increases:

- Below 3 °C (37 °F), woody plants are absent.
- From 3 to 5 °C (37 to 41 °F), woody plants grow as prostrate dwarf shrubs. Examples include Dryas sp., and Salix arctica.
- From 5 to 7 °C (41 to 45 °F), woody plants increase in height to 15 cm (5.9 in). Examples include Arctous alpina and Cassiope tetragona.
- From 7 to 9 °C (45 to 48 °F), woody plants become erect dwarf shrubs, up to 40 cm (16 in) tall. Examples include Betula nana, Rhododendron tomentosum (Ledum decumbens), Vaccinium uliginosum.
- From 9 to 12 °C (48 to 54 °F), woody plants become low shrubs, up to 2 m (6 ft 7 in) tall. Examples include Betula glandulosa and Salix glauca.
- The treeline occurs when the July mean temperature is approximately 10 to 12 °C (50 to 54 °F).

Because small changes in temperature affect survival, growth, and reproduction of arctic plants, the effects of local microclimates can be significant. Plants low to the ground can create their own microclimate: when the air temperature away from the ground is −12 °C (10 °F), the temperature of dark moss can be 10 °C (50 °F). Even if the local microclimate cannot maintain temperatures above 0 °C (32 °F), some arctic plants and flowers, such as Chamaenerion latifolium, can survive a frost with no damage. Some plants start to grow under up to 100 cm (39 in) of snow cover.

Low temperatures also indirectly affect arctic vegetation via soil effects. Melt-freeze cycles causes frost heaving, which heavily disturbs the soil and prevents plant communities from reaching ecological equilibrium. Drainage has a larger effect on local species composition than local climate changes.

Wind is another climatic factor that affects vegetation. Wind can prune vegetation exposed above the snow line, and can erode even cushion plants that are low to the ground.

Arctic vegetation is very sensitive to climate change and disturbance such as fire, herbivory, and human impacts. Research has documented an increase in shrubs and, to a lesser extent, trees in the Arctic over recent decades. Major changes in vegetation structure such as these have a cascading effect on other ecosystem attributes, such as wildlife distribution, fire regime, and water chemistry.
