= Nordic Journal of Botany =

Peer-reviewed scientific journal

- Discipline: Botany
- Language: English
- Edited by: Torbjörn Tyler and Sara Cousins

Publication details
- History: 1981–present
- Publisher: Wiley-Blackwell on behalf of the Nordic Society Oikos
- Frequency: Monthly
- Impact factor: 0.931 (2021)

Standard abbreviations
- ISO 4: Nord. J. Bot.

Indexing
- ISSN: 1756-1051 (print); 0107-055X (web)

Links
- Journal homepage; Online access; Online archive

The Nordic Journal of Botany is a monthly peer-reviewed scientific journal of botany, including the plant ecology, taxonomy, evolution, conservation, and biogeography of plants, algae, bryophytes, and fungi. It originated from four botanical journals, Botanisk Tidsskrift, Friesia, Norwegian Journal of Botany, and Botaniska Notiser, that merged as one. Currently, the journal is published by Wiley on behalf of the Nordic Society Oikos (NSO) in collaboration with Oikos, Journal of Avian Biology, Wildlife Biology, Lindbergia and Ecography.

The editors-in-chief are Torbjörn Tyler (Lund University) and Sara Cousins (Stockholm University). According to the Journal Citation Reports, the journal has a 2021 impact factor of 0.931, ranking it 200th out of 240 journals in the category "Plant Sciences".

== See also ==
- List of botany journals
