= Dansk Botanisk Arkiv =

- Discipline: Botany
- Language: English

Publication details
- History: 1913–present

Standard abbreviations
- ISO 4: Dan. Bot. Ark.

Dansk Botanisk Arkiv was a Danish scientific journal or monograph series concerning botany, issued by the Danish Botanical Society. It was published from 1913 to 1980.

Articles were written in Danish, German, English and French. The synonym Res Botanicae Danicae was printed on the front page of some issues.

In 1980, it was fused with Botaniska Notiser Supplement under the name Opera Botanica, which since then has been the monograph series of the Nordic Journal of Botany.
