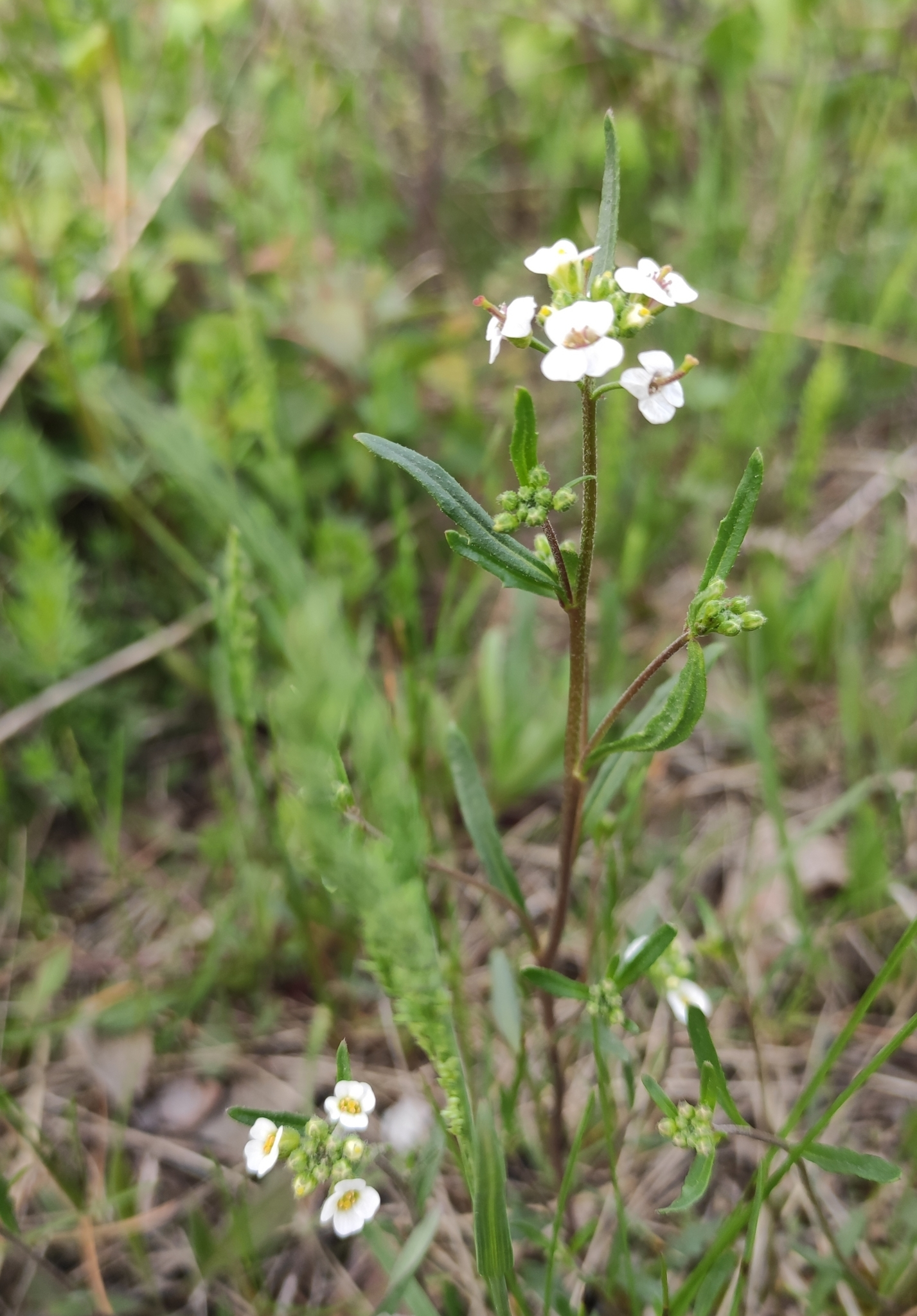

Scientific classification
- Kingdom: Plantae
- Clade: Tracheophytes
- Clade: Angiosperms
- Clade: Eudicots
- Clade: Rosids
- Order: Brassicales
- Family: Brassicaceae
- Genus: Braya
- Species: B. humilis

Binomial name
- Braya humilis (C.A.Mey.) B.L.Rob

Subspecies
- List: Braya humilis subsp. ellesmerensis J.G.Harris; Braya humilis subsp. humilis; Braya humilis subsp. maccallae J.G.Harris; Braya humilis subsp. porsildii J.G.Harris

Synonyms
- List: Dichasianthus humilis (C.A.Mey.) Soják; Neotorularia humilis (C.A.Mey.) Hedge & J.Léonard; Sisymbrium humile C.A.Mey.; Stenophragma humile (C.A.Mey.) B.Fedtsch.; Torularia humilis (C.A.Mey.) O.E.Schulz

= Braya humilis =

Species of plant

Braya humilis, also known as low northern rockcress, is a species of plant. It was first described in 1831.

== Description ==
Braya humilis is a perennial species with short, stout leaves that form a rosette at the base.

== Distribution ==
Braya humilis is found across North and Central Asia, and in the arctic and alpine regions of North America. In China, it is found primarily on the Tibetan Plateau.
