= Botaniska Notiser =

- Discipline: Botany
- Language: Swedish
- Edited by: Various

Publication details
- History: 1839–1980
- Publisher: Lunds Botaniska Förening (Sweden)
- Frequency: Quarterly

Standard abbreviations
- ISO 4: Bot. Not.

Indexing
- Botaniska notiser (1839–1980)
- ISSN: 0006-8195
- Botaniska notiser (2001–)
- ISSN: 1650-3767

Links
- Journal homepage

Botaniska Notiser was a Swedish scientific periodical concerning botany, issued in Lund, by Societate botanica Lundensi or [Lunds Botaniska Förening]. It was published from 1839 to 1980, when it fused with Botanisk Tidsskrift, Friesia and Norwegian Journal of Botany to form the Nordic Journal of Botany. In 2001, the journal reappeared as a regional journal for botany in south Sweden.

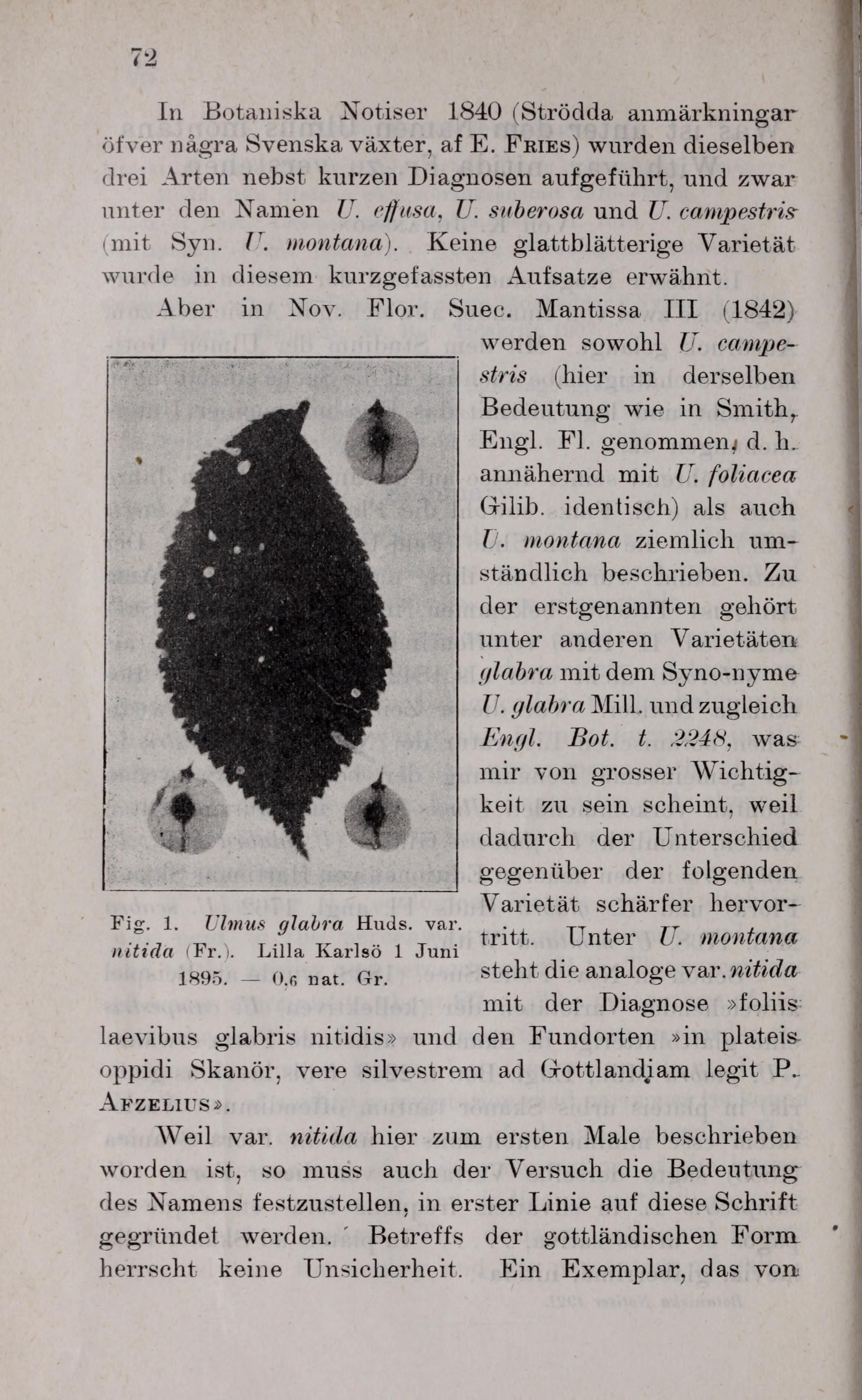
Ulmus glabra var. nitida from Botaniska Notiser page 72 in 1921

Monographs were published in a parallel series, Botaniska Notiser Supplement (1947–1954). This series was fused in 1980 with Dansk Botanisk Arkiv under the name Opera Botanica, which since then has been the monograph series of the Nordic Journal of Botany.

== Editors ==
- 1900–1921: C. F. O. Nordstedt
- 1922–1928: Harald Kylin
- 1929–1937: Nils Sylvén
- 1938–1949: Henning Weimarck
- 1950–1953: H. Hjelmqvist
- 1954–1955: Tycho Norlindh
- 1956–1957: Henning Weimarck
- 1958–1964: H. Hjelmqvist
- 1965–1966: Bertil Nordenstam
- 1967–1968: Rolf Dahlgren
- 1969–1970: Ingemar Björkqvist and Hans Runemark
- 1971–1972: Arne Strid
- 1972–1975: Gunnar Weimarck
- 1976–1979: Thomas Karlsson
- 2001–present: Kjell-Arne Olsson

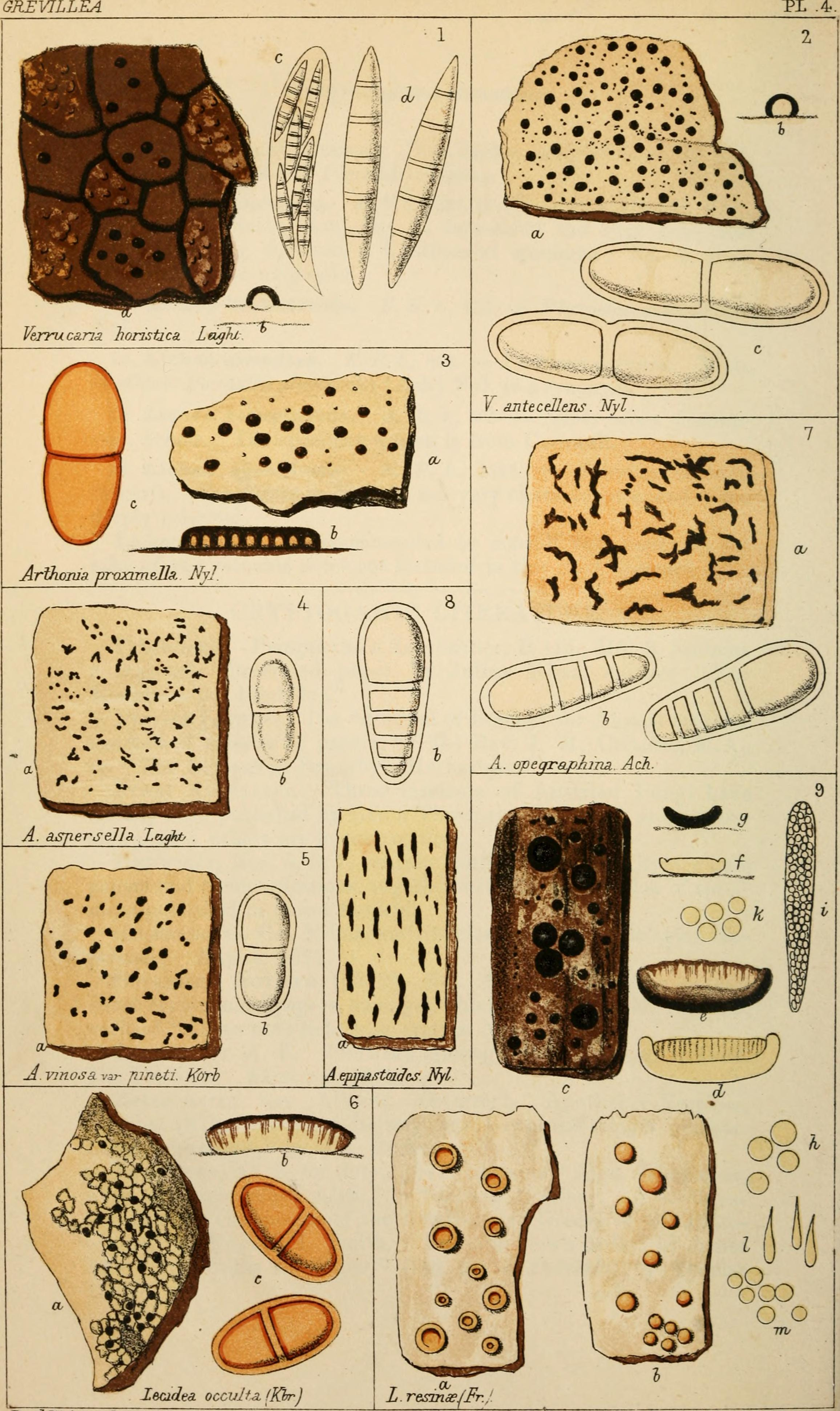
Grevillea from 'Botaniska notiser' in 1872
