= Doris Löve =

Swedish-Icelandic botanist (1918–2000)

- Born: 2 January 1918; Kristianstad
- Died: 25 February 2000 (aged 82); San Jose, California
- Education: Lund University
- Known for: Cytotaxonomy in the Arctic
- Spouse: Áskell Löve

Doris Benta Maria Löve, née Wahlén (born 2 January 1918 in Kristianstad – deceased 25 February 2000 in San Jose, California) was a Swedish systematic botanist, particularly active in the Arctic.

== Biography ==
Doris Löve was born in Kristianstad, Sweden. She studied botany at Lund University from 1937. She married her fellow student and colleague, the Icelander Áskell Löve. She received her PhD in botany in 1944. She focused her doctorate on the sexuality of Melandrium. After their studies, the couple moved to Iceland. They moved to Winnipeg in 1951, to Montreal in 1955, and to Boulder in 1965. At universities where Áskell Löve taught, Doris Löve could not hold a faculty position at the same time as her husband. They finally moved to San Jose, California, in 1974.

Together, Áskell and Doris Löve undertook numerous investigations of the chromosome numbers of plants and their use in plant systematics. They published numerous accounts in this field, and are considered the founders of cytotaxonomy.

In 1962, she was the convener of an influential scientific conference on the North Atlantic Biota and their History with contributions from a.o. Eric Hultén, Tyge W. Böcher, Hugo Sjörs, John Axel Nannfeldt, Knut Fægri, Bruce C. Heezen and Marie Tharp.

In 1974, her husband Áskell Löve, then full professor and chairman of the biology department of the university of Colorado Boulder, was forced to resign. In 1997, she wrote her family history, a 86-page biography that provides a detailed explanation of her husband's forced resignation. This mémoire was deposited at the Hunt Botanical Library in Pittsburgh in 1997 and was supposed to be kept unreleased until 2018.

== Other roles ==
- Member of the Institute of Arctic and Alpine Research (IAAR)
- Associate curator of University of Colorado Museum Herbarium (COLO)

== Selected publications ==
=== Papers on botany ===
- Löve, Á.; Löve, D. (1961). Chromosome numbers of central and northwest European plant species. Opera Botanica vol. 5. Stockholm: Almqvist & Wiksell. pp. 1–581.
- Löve, Á.; Löve, D. (1966). Cytotaxonomy of the alpine vascular plants of Mount Washington. University of Colorado Studies. Series of Biology No. 24. Boulder: University of Colorado. pp. 1–75.
- Löve, Á.; Löve, D. (1974). Cytotaxonomical atlas of the Slovenian flora. Cytotaxonomical Atlases vol. 1. Vaduz: J. Cramer. p. 1241.
- Löve, Á.; Löve, D. (1975). Cytotaxonomical atlas of the Arctic flora. Cytotaxonomical Atlases vol. 2. Vaduz: J. Cramer. p. 598.
- Löve, Á.; Löve, D.; Pichi-Sermolli, R. E. G. (1977). Cytotaxonomical atlas of the Pteridophyta. Cytotaxonomical Atlases vol. 3. Vaduz: J. Cramer. p. 398.

=== Conference proceedings ===
- Löve, Á.; Löve, D. (1963). North Atlantic Biota and their History: A symposium held at University of Iceland, Reykjavík July 1962. Oxford: Pergamon Press. This conference dealt with biogeographical effects of the continental drift.

Her classification work enabled Kenneth Hare's wife Jocelyn to put together an herbarium of plants from the Kaumajet Mountains.

=== Translations ===
- Botanical observations of the Penny Highlands of Baffin Island, Results of the Second Baffin Expedition by the Arctic Institute of North America (1953) under the leadership of Col. P.D. Baird
- Nikolai Vavilov, Origin and geography of cultivated plants, Archives of Natural History, January 1994

Doris Löve also translated two books of Nikolai Vavilov into English.
