= Hereditas =

- Discipline: Genetics
- Language: English
- Edited by: Stefan Baumgartner, Yongyong Shi

Publication details
- History: 1920–present
- Publisher: BioMed Central

Standard abbreviations
- ISO 4: Hereditas

Indexing
- CODEN: HEREAY
- ISSN: 0018-0661 (print); 1601-5223 (web)
- OCLC no.: 01752016

Links
- Journal homepage

Hereditas is a scientific journal concerning genetics. It has been published since 1920 by the Mendelska sällskapet i Lund (Mendelian Society of Lund). In its long history it has published important papers in the field of genetics, including the first discovery of the correct human chromosome count by Joe Hin Tijo and Albert Levan in 1956. In the post-genomic era, the scope of Hereditas has evolved to include any research on genomic analysis.

In 2005, Hereditas changed from a traditional subscription-based journal to become an open access, web based and author funded journal. By the end of 2014, Hereditas terminated its activity with Wiley Publishers. In May 2015 Hereditas was re-launched and became part of the portfolio of the open access publisher Biomed Central (BMC), now owned by Springer Nature.

It is indexed by BIOSIS, DOAJ, MEDLINE, Science Citation Index, and Scopus. The impact factor (IF) of 2025 is 2.6.

Editors-in-chief (EiC): Robert Larsson (1920–1954), Arne Müntzing (1955–1977), Arne Lundqvist (1978–1988), Karl Fredga and Arne Lundqvist (1989–1996), Ulf Gyllensten (1996–2001), Anssi Saura (2002–2011), Stefan Baumgartner (2012 - 2023), Yongyong Shi (2016 -, in parallel to Baumgartner). Ramin Massoumi (2024-, in parallel to Yongyong Shi)

Handling editors: Fumihiko Takeuchi, Julhash U. Kazi, Hamed Kioumarsi, Eduardo López Urrutia, Hua-Sheng Chiu, Yongyong Shi, Lu Chen
