= Áskell Löve =

Icelandic botanist (1916–1994)

- Born: 20 October 1916; Reykjavík, Iceland
- Died: 29 May 1994 (aged 77); San Jose, California
- Education: Lund University
- Known for: use of chromosome numbers in plant systematics
- Awards: Guggenheim fellow in 1963
- Scientific career
- Fields: Plant evolution
- Workplaces: University of Iceland, University of Manitoba, Université de Montréal and University of Colorado at Boulder

Áskell Löve (20 October 1916 – 29 May 1994) was an Icelandic systematic botanist, particularly active in the Arctic.

== Education ==
Áskell studied botany at Lund University, Sweden, from 1937. He received his PhD in 1942 in botany and a D.Sc. degree in genetics the year after. From 1941 to 1945, he was a research associate at Lund University and a corresponding geneticist at the University of Iceland.

== Work ==
In 1945, where he served as director of Institute of Botany and Plant Breeding at the University of Iceland 1945–1951. Then, the family moved to North America, where Áskell became associate professor of botany at the University of Manitoba, Canada. In 1956, he became Professeur de Recherches at Université de Montréal and, in 1964 professor of biology at the University of Colorado at Boulder, which he remained until 1974.

Áskell was awarded a Guggenheim fellow in 1963 and elected member of the Icelandic Academy of Sciences. He was a co-founder of the Flora Europaea-project. He retained his Icelandic citizenship to his death.

Áskell was particularly interested in the chromosome numbers of plants. He published numerous accounts in this field, including editing more than hundred chromosome number reports published in the scientific journal Taxon between 1964 and 1988. He made a major contribution to the evolution and taxonomy of the wheat-relatives in the Triticeae.

In 1974, Áskell, then full professor and chairman of the biology department of the university of Colorado Boulder, was forced to resign. In 1997, his wife wrote her family history, a 86-page biography that provides a detailed explanation of her husband's forced resignation. This mémoire was deposited at the Hunt Botanical Library in Pittsburgh in 1997 and was supposed to be kept unreleased until 2018.

Áskell also wrote papers about plant evolution from a more theoretical angle, e.g. the still cited The biological species concept and its evolutionary structure.

He wrote some floras on Icelandic plants, including Íslenzk Ferðaflóra (1970, 2nd. ed. 1975), illustrated by Dagny Tande Lid.

== Personal life ==
Áskell married his fellow student and colleague Doris Löve (née Wahlén). Together, they moved back to Iceland in 1945.
