= Rink =

Rink may refer to:

- Ice rink, a surface of ice used for ice skating
  - Figure skating rink, an ice rink designed for figure skating
  - Ice hockey rink, an ice rink designed for ice hockey
  - Speed skating rink, an ice rink designed for speed skating
- Curling rink, used to refer to both a curling team and the playing surface
- Roller rink, a surface used for roller skating or roller hockey

== People ==
- Anna Aho Rink, American politician
- Arno Rink (1940–2017), German painter
- Hinrich Johannes Rink (1819–1893), Danish geologist
- Paul E. Rink (1916–2000), American judge, lawyer, and politician
- Signe Rink (1836–1909), Greenland-born Danish writer and ethnologist
- Rink Babka (1936–2022), American discus thrower

== Places ==
- Rink Glacier (Sermerssuaq), W Greenland
- Rink Glacier (Melville Bay), NW Greenland

== See also ==
- The Rink (disambiguation)
