= Carl Peter Holbøll =

Royal Inspector of South Greenland
- In office 1828–1856
- Preceded by: Ove Valentin Kielsen
- Succeeded by: Jørgen Nielsen Møller

Royal Inspector of North Greenland
- In office 1825–1828
- Preceded by: Johannes West
- Succeeded by: Ludvig Fasting

Personal details
- Born: 31 December 1795 Copenhagen, Denmark
- Died: 1856 (aged 60–61) North Atlantic
- Occupation: Soldier, explorer, administrator

Captain Lieutenant Carl Peter Holbøll (1795 – 1856) was a Royal Danish Navy officer, colonial administrator and explorer.

Holbøll served as Royal Inspector of Colonies and Whaling in North Greenland (1825–1828), and later as Inspector of South Greenland (1828–1856). During his tenure, he developed an interest in natural history and contributed significantly by sending extensive faunistic collections to zoologists in Copenhagen.

Holbøll was a skilled amateur botanist and entomologist, and authored a treatise on Greenlandic birds. In the paper, he described the arctic redpoll for the first time, naming it Linota hornemanni (now known as Acanthis flammea hornemanni or Acanthis hornemanni), after the botanist Jens Wilken Hornemann. He also wrote a mathematics textbook for Greenlandic schools, which remained in use for about a century.

Tragically, after visiting Denmark, Holbøll boarded the brig Baldur, which sank en route to Greenland, resulting in the loss of all on board.

== Commemoration of Holbøll in species' names ==
Professor Johannes Theodor Reinhardt described the North American subspecies of the red-necked grebe, naming it "Podiceps holböllii". As Holbøll was Danish, under the International Code of Zoological Nomenclature Article 32.5.2.1, scientific names derived from his name treat the ø/ö as 'o', rather than 'oe' had it been derived from a German name, thus the correct spelling is now Podiceps grisegena holbollii. Hornemann had previously received plant collections from Holbøll and named a new species of rockcress Arabis holboellii, now known as Boechera holboellii.

- Krøyer's deep sea angler fish Ceratias holbolli (Krøyer, 1845) (Ceratiidae)
- Amphipod Phoxocephalus holbolli (Krøyer, 1842) (Phoxocephalidae)
- Amphipod Hippomedon holbolli (Krøyer, 1846) (Lysianassidae)
- Marine gastropod Colus holbolli (Møller, 1842) (Buccinidae)
- Marine gastropod Dolabrifera holbolli Bergh, 1872 (Aplysiidae)
- Freshwater gastropod Lymnaea holbolli (Møller, 1842) (Lymnaeidae)
- Flowering plant Boechera holboellii (Hornem.) Á.Löve & D.Löve (Brassicaceae)
