= Johannes West =

Inspector of North Greenland (1782–1835)

Royal Inspector of North Greenland
- In office 1817–1825
- Preceded by: Peter Hanning Motzfeldt
- Succeeded by: Carl Peter Holbøll

Personal details
- Born: 2 April 1782
- Died: 11 October 1835 (aged 53) Copenhagen, Denmark
- Occupation: Merchant, administrator

Johannes West (1782–1835), was Denmark's inspector of Nordgrønland.

He took over as inspector of Nordgrønland in 1817 after Peter Motzfeldt, even though Frederik Diderik Sechmann Fleischer had filled in for Motzfeldt in the last two years of his work, and was seen by many as his natural successor.
