= List of newspapers in Greenland =

There are two newspapers in Greenland.

- Atuagagdliutit/Grønlandsposten
- Sermitsiaq
