= Jørgen Nielsen Møller =

Danish merchant and Inspector of South Greenland (1801–1862)

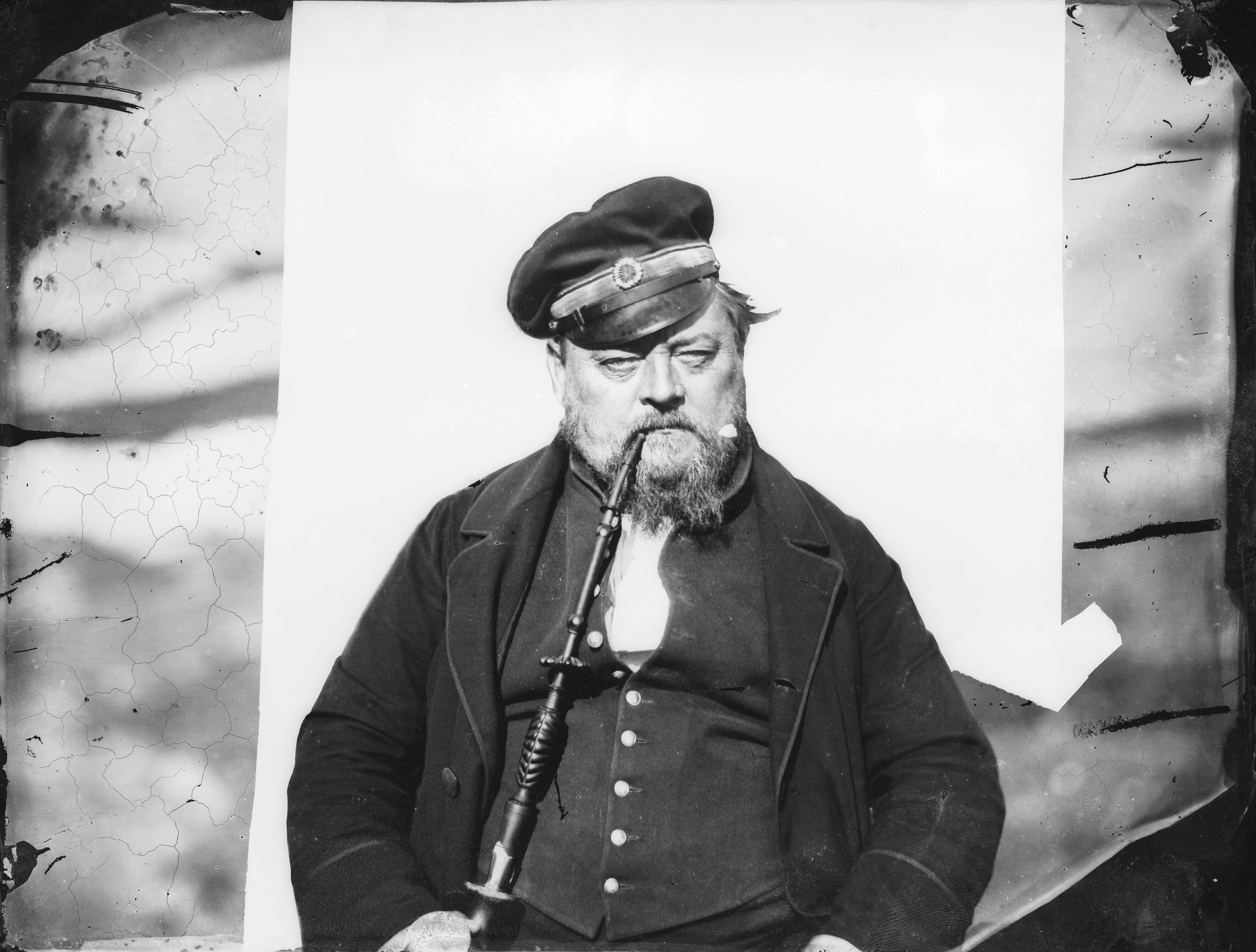

Royal Inspector of South Greenland
- In office 1856–1857
- Preceded by: Carl Peter Holbøll
- Succeeded by: Hinrich Johannes Rink

Governor of Holsteinsborg
- In office 1841–1856

Personal details
- Born: November 17, 1801 Skydebjerg, Denmark
- Died: July 6, 1862 (age 60) Copenhagen, Denmark
- Children: Signe Rink
- Occupation: Merchant, sailor, lawyer

Jørgen Nielsen Møller (17 November 1801 – 6 July 1862) was a Danish merchant, governor of Holsteinsborg (now Sisimiut) and Inspector of South Greenland.

== Biography ==
He was the son of Niels Jørgensen Møller and Karen Rasmusdatter. Møller studied law before working as an assistant in Nuuk, Qeqertarsuatsiaat, Paamiut, Aasiaat, Sisimiut and Qaqortoq. Møller served as Governor of Holsteinsborg for 13 years until he replaced the Inspector of South Greenland, Carl Peter Holbøll (1795-1856), who was lost at sea returning from Denmark in 1856. He served as Inspector until the following year, when his son-in-law, Hinrich Johannes Rink (1819–1893) replaced him.

He was married to Antonette Ernestine Constance Tommerup (1813-91). His daughter was the noted Greenland-born ethnologist Signe Rink (1836–1909).

== See also ==
- List of inspectors of Greenland
