= List of mammals of Nunavut =

Nunavut has several species of mammals (ᐱᓱᒃᑎ, pisukti), of which the Inuit found use for almost all. The larger animals such as the caribou would be eaten, with the skin used for tents and clothing and the sinew used for thread. In lean times even animals such as the fox would have been eaten and some people did eat it even when other foods were available. With the arrival of the traders the fox skin became a valuable source for trade, however, traditionally the skin was not often used except as a sanitary napkin. The skins of smaller animals such as the weasel would have been used to provide decoration on clothing.

Some of the animals in this list, such as the lynx, are rarely seen as they live mainly in the very southern part of the territory away from any communities.

There are several different dialects of Inuktitut and Inuinnaqtun as well as two alphabets, Inuktitut syllabics and Latin. The Inuit name or spelling may differ from one region to another and in extreme cases from one community to another.

== Artiodactyla (ᑯᑭᑯᖅᑐᔪᑦ, kukikuqtujut) ==
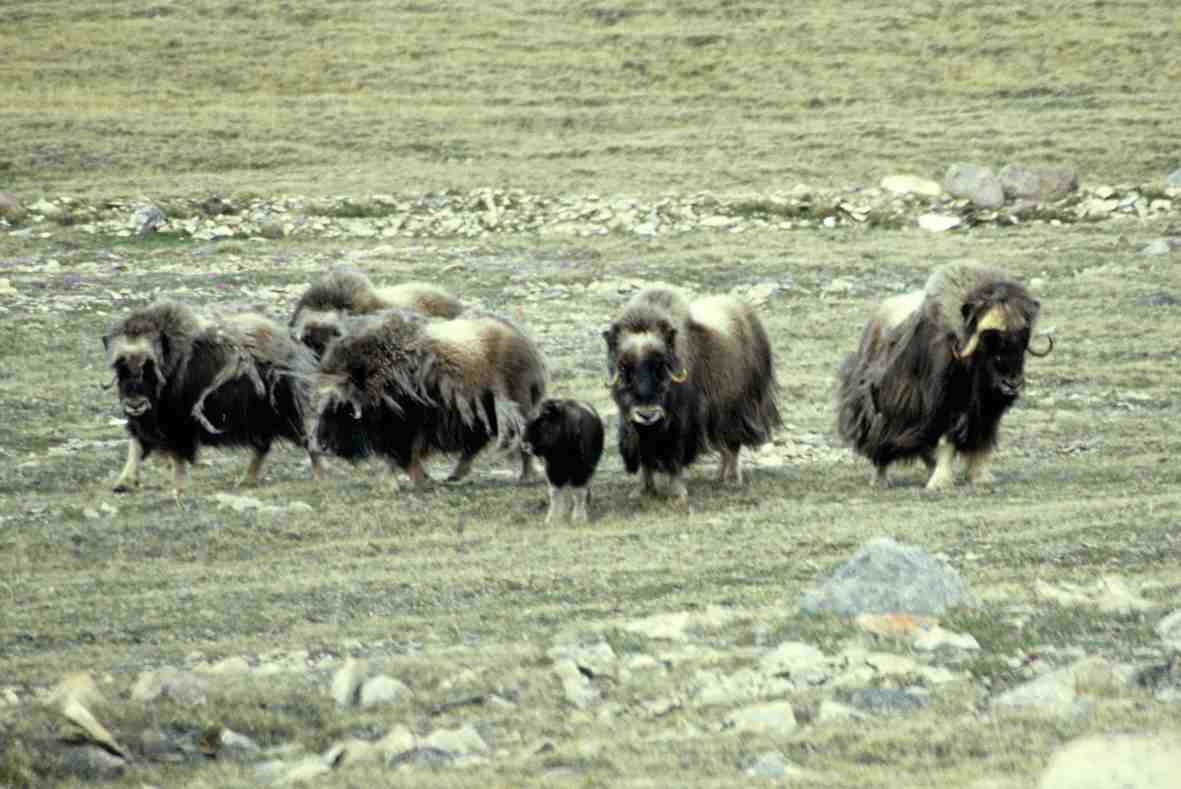
Muskoxen

- Bovidae (ᓇᒃᔪᒋᒃᑐᑦ)
  - Muskox (ᐅᒥᖕᒪᒃ, umingmait, umingmak, oomingmak) Ovibos moschatus LC
- Cervidae (ᓇᒃᔪᓖᑦ)
  - Caribou (ᑐᒃᑐ, tuktut) Rangifer tarandus VU
    - Barren-ground caribou (ᓇᐹᕐᑐᕐᑲᓐᖏᑦᑐᒥ ᑐᒃᑐ, tuktut, tuktu) Rangifer tarandus groenlandicus DD
    - Peary caribou (ᕐᑯᑦᓯᑦᑐᒥ ᑐᒃᑐ, tuku, qakuqtakuluit tuktut, qikiqtani tuktuit) Rangifer tarandus pearyi EN
  - Moose Alces alces LC
    - Western moose (ᑐᒃᑐᕙᒃ, tuktuvak) Alces alces andersoni DD

== Carnivora (ᓂᕐᑭᑐᖅᑎᑦ, ᓂᕿᑐᐃᓐᓇᐃᓈᖅ, niqituinnainaaq) ==
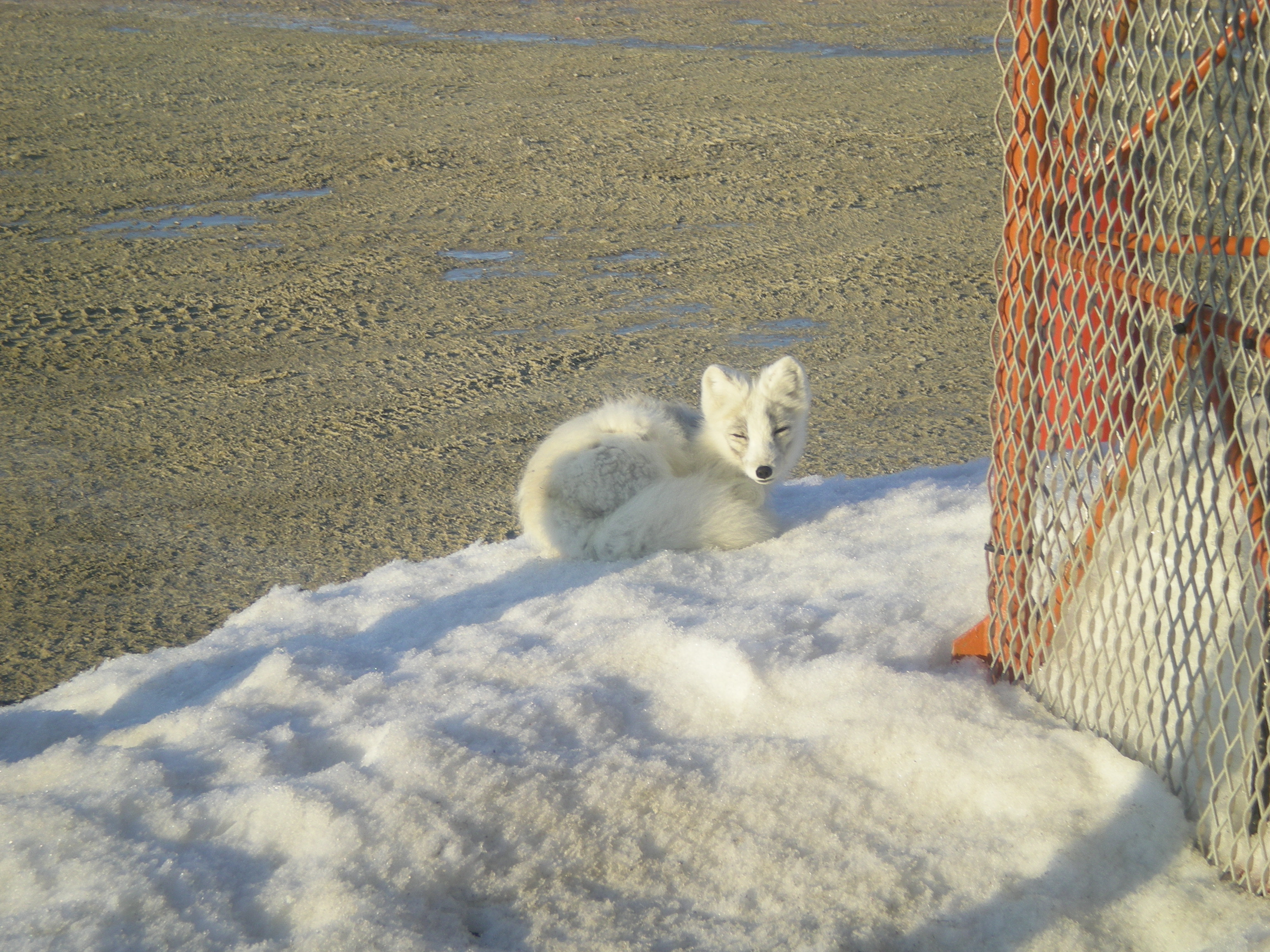
Arctic fox

- Canidae (ᕐᑭᒻᐅᔭᑦ)
  - Grey wolf (ᐊᒪᕈᖅ, amaruq) Canis lupus LC
    - Arctic wolf, Canis lupus arctos DD
  - Arctic fox (ᑎᕆᒐᓐᓂᐊᖅ, tiriganniak, tiriqaniaq) Vulpes lagopus LC
  - Red fox (ᑲᔪᖅ, kajuqtuq, kajuit) Vulpes vulpes LC
- Felidae (ᑯᑭᓕᒑᕐᔪᐃᑦ)
  - Canada lynx (ᐱᖅᑐᖅᓯᕋᖅ, piqtuqsiraq) Lynx canadensis LC
- Ursidae (ᓄᑭᓖᑦ)
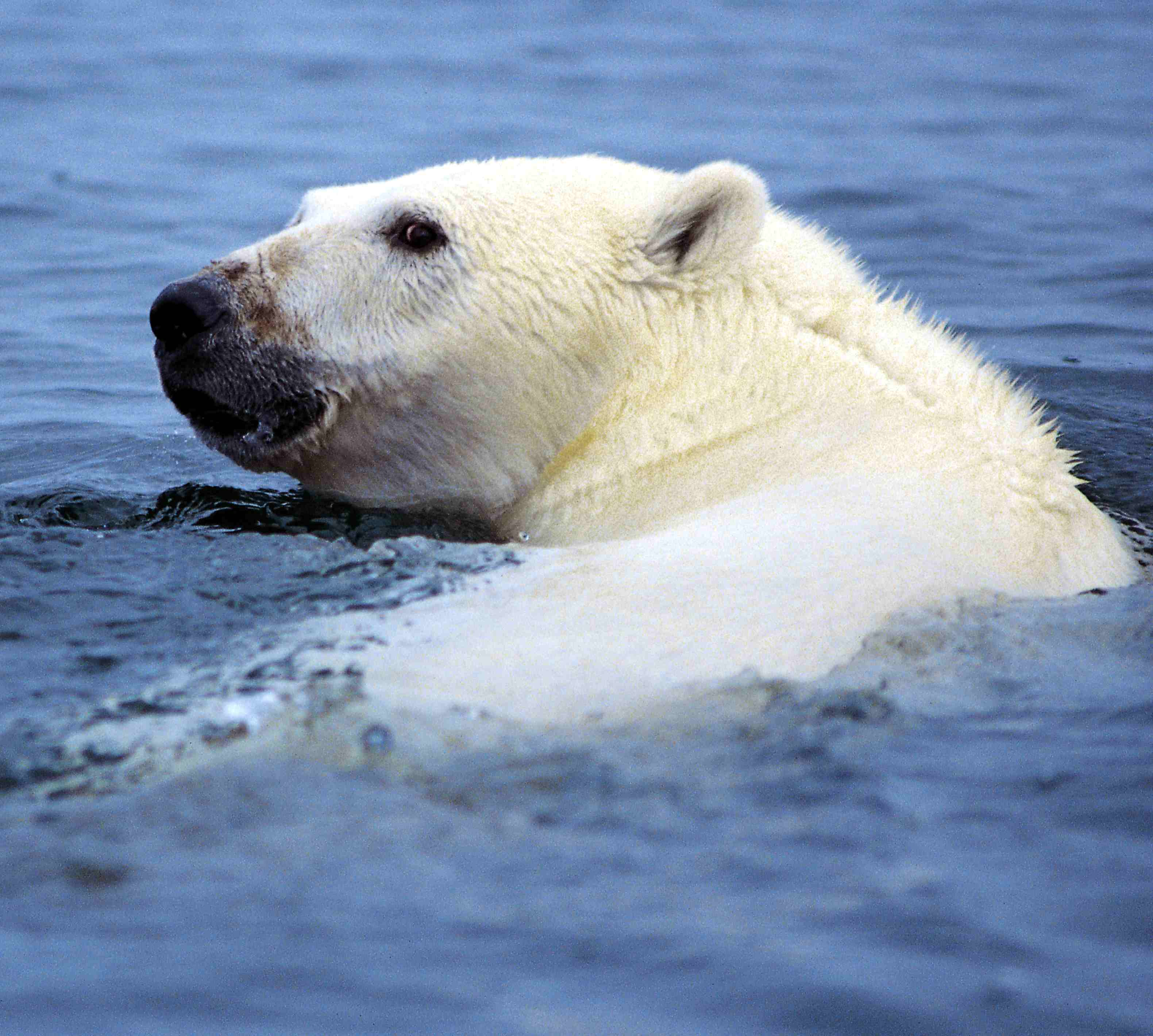
  Polar bear
  - Black bear (ᐊᒃᖤᒃ, aklaq) Ursus americanus LC
  - Grizzly bear (ᓇᐹᖅᑐᖃᖕᒋᑦᑐᒥ ᐊᒃᖤᒃ, atiqpuq) Ursus arctos horribilis LC
  - Polar bear (ᓇᓄᖅ, nanuq) Ursus maritimus VU
- Mustelidae (ᑎᕆᐊᓂᙶᖅᑐᑦ)
  - Wolverine (ᖃᕝᕕᒃ, qalvik, qavvik) Gulo gulo LC
  - River otter (ᑯᒻᒥ ᐸᒥᐅᖅᑑᖅ, pamiuqtuuq) Lontra canadensis LC
  - Beringian ermine (ᑎᕆᐊᖅ, tiriaqpak, tiqiak) Mustela erminea LC
  - American ermine (ᑎᕆᐊᖅ, tiriaqpak, tiqiak) Mustela richardsonii LC
  - Least weasel (ᒥᑭᓂᖅᓴᖅ ᑎᕆᐊᖅ, tiriaq, tiqiak) Mustela nivalis LC
  - American marten (ᖃᑉᕕᐊᕐᓯᐊᖅ, qapviarsiaq) Martes americana LC
  - American mink (ᑎᕆᐊᖅᐸᒃ, tiriaqpak) Neogale vison LC
  - Fisher (ᑎᕆᐊᕐᔪᐊᖅ) Pekania pennanti LC
- Phocidae (ᓇᑦᓯᖅ, natsiq)
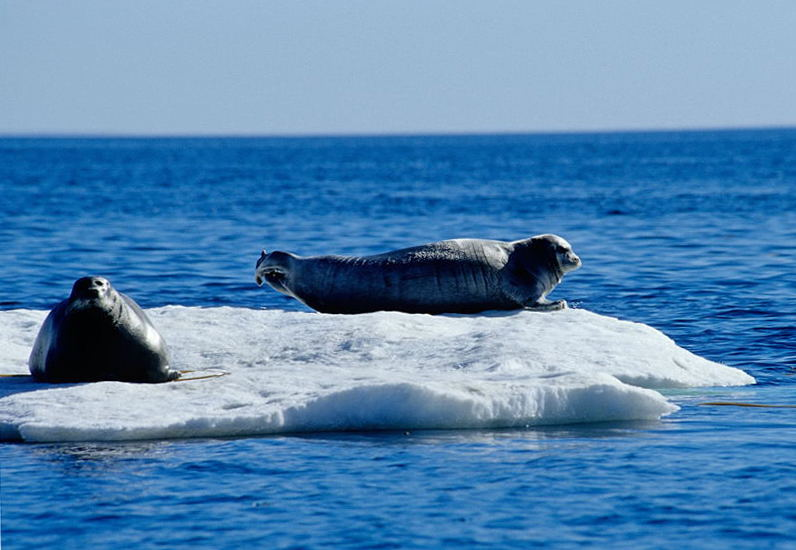
  Bearded seal
  - Bearded seal (ᐅᒡᔪᒃ, ᐅᒥᒃᑑᖅ, ugjuk) Erignathus barbatus
  - Hooded seal (ᓇᑦᓯᕙᒃ, natsivak) Cystophora cristata VU
  - Harbour seal (ᖃᓯᒋᐊᖅ, qasigiaq) Phoca vitulina
  - Harp seal (ᖃᐃᕈᓕᒃ, qairulik) Pagophilus groenlandicus LC
  - Grey seal (ᐳᕕᓲᖅ, puvisuuq) Halichoerus grypus LC
  - Ringed seal (ᓇᑦᑎᖅ, nattiq) Pusa hispida LC
- Odobenidae
  - Walrus (ᐊᐃᕕᖅ, aiviq) Odobenus rosmarus VU

== Lagomorpha (ᑭᖑᓪᓖᖅᑯᖅᑐᔪᑦ, kingulliiqkuqtujut) ==
- Leporidae (ᐅᑲᓖᑦ)
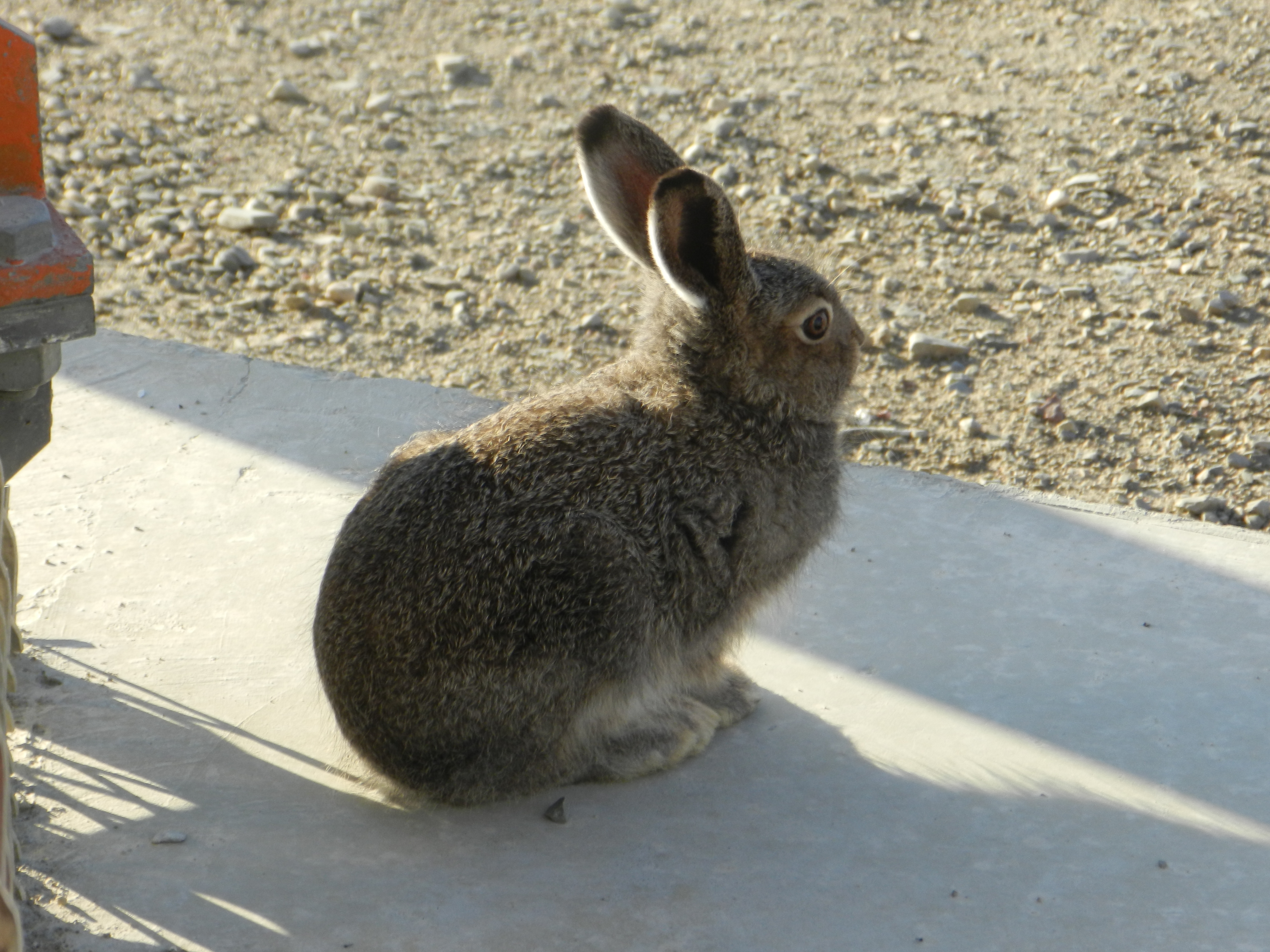
  Arctic hare
  - Arctic hare (ᐅᑭᐅᖅᑕᖅᑐᒥ ᐅᑲᓕᖅᐸᒃ, ukaliq, okalik, ukalik) Lepus arcticus LC
  - Snowshoe hare (ᑭᖑᓪᓖᕐᑯᕐᑐᔪᖅ ᐅᑲᓕᖅ) Lepus americanus LC

== Rodentia (ᑎᓯᓖᑦ, tisiliit) ==
- Castoridae (ᐸᒥᐅᒥᓅᖅᑐᑦ)
  - American beaver (ᑭᒋᐊᖅ, kigiaq, kiqiaq) Castor canadensis
- Muridae (ᐊᕕᙵᐃᑦ)
  - Muskrat (ᐊᕕᙵᕐᔪᐊᖅ, kivgaluk, avinnqarjuaq) Ondatra zibethicus
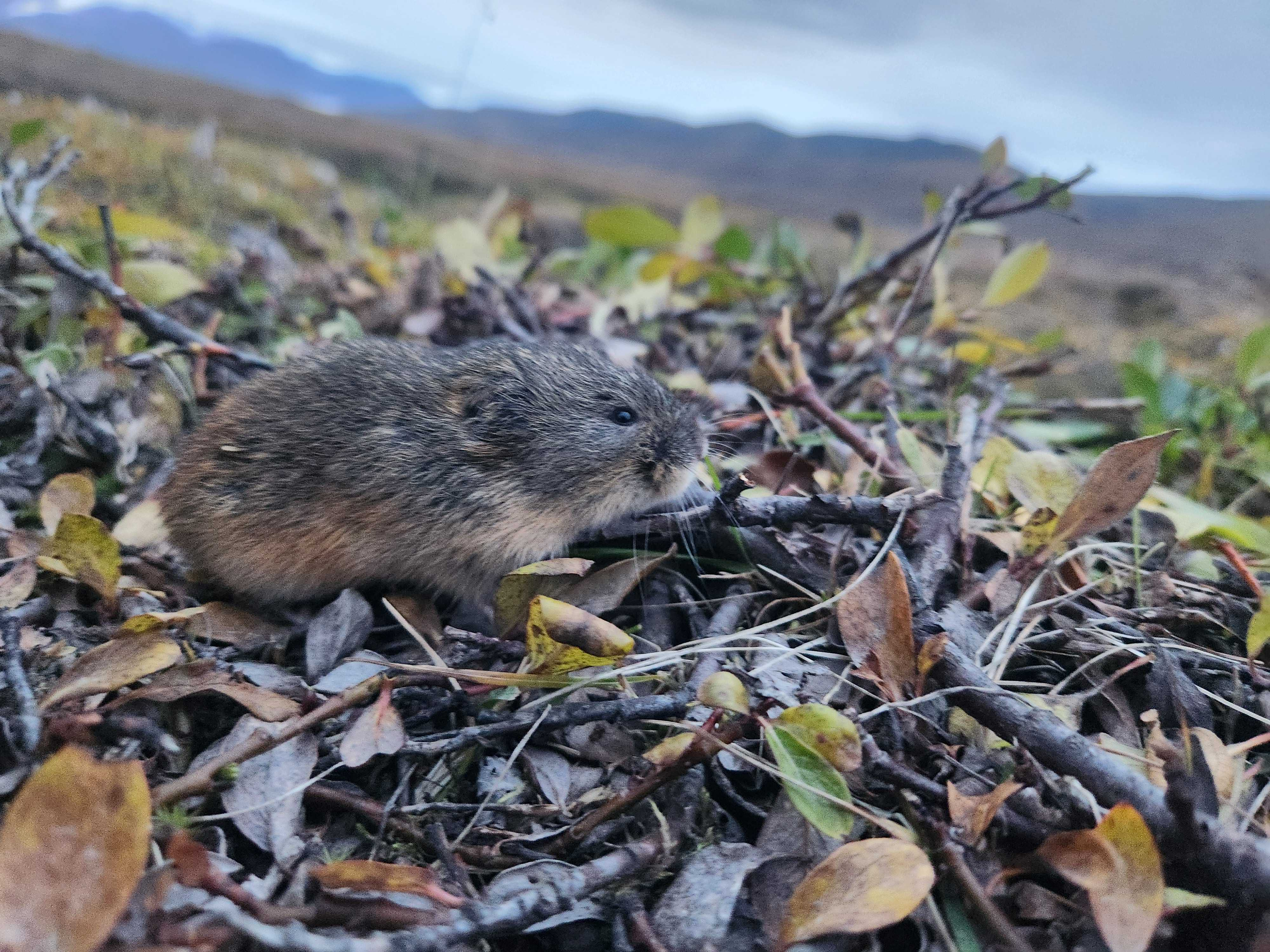
    North American brown lemming
  - North American brown lemming (ᑲᔪᖅ ᐊᕕᙵᖅ, kayuqtumik avin'ngak, avin'ngaq, avinnqaq) Lemmus trimucronatus
  - Peary land collared lemming (ᕐᑲᑯᖅᑕᖅ ᐊᕕᙵᖅ, qutulingmik avin'ngak, avin'ngaq, aupajaaqtuq avinnqaq) Dicrostonyx groenlandicus
  - Meadow vole (ᐊᕕᙵᕋᓛᖅ) Microtus pennsylvanicus
  - Northern red-backed vole (ᐅᑭᐅᖅᑕᖅᑐᒥ ᐊᐅᐸᖅᑐᒥᒃ ᕐᑯᓖᓕᒃ ᐊᕕᙵᕋᓛᖅ) Myodes rutilus
  - Brown rat (ulimakka) Rattus norvegicus (introduced)
- Sciuridae (ᓯᒃᓯᑦ)
  - Arctic ground squirrel (ᓯᒃᓯᒃ, siksik) Spermophilus parryii
  - Red squirrel (ᐊᐅᐸᖅᑐᖅ ᓯᒃᓯᐅᔭᖅ) Tamiasciurus hudsonicus

== Insectivora (ᕐᑯᐱᕐᕈᑐᖅᑏᑦ, rkupirrutuqtiit) ==
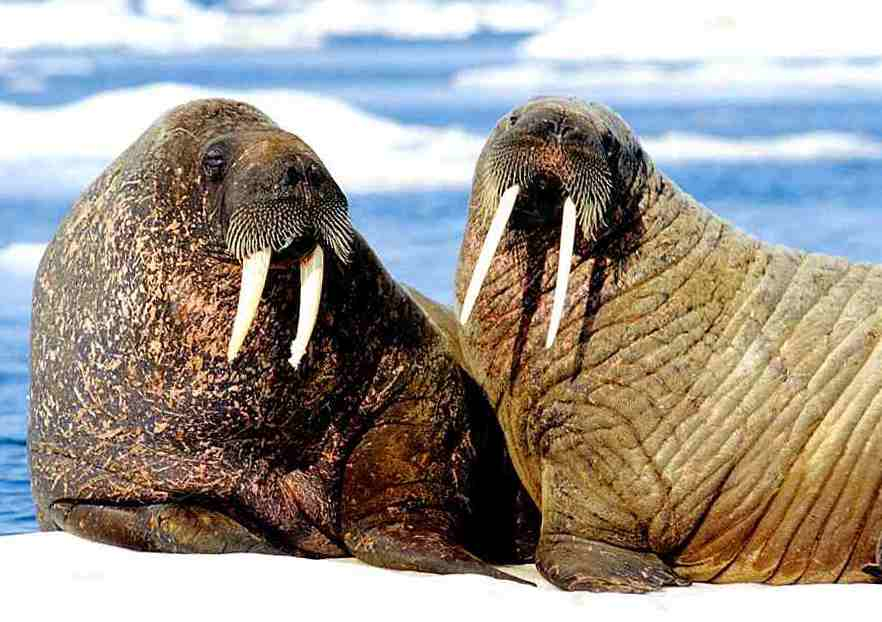
Walrus

- Soricidae (ᓂᕇᓐᓇᓲᑦ, utjunaq)
  - Masked shrew (ᐊᐅᐸᖅᑐᖅ ᓯᒃᓯᐅᔭᖅ, uqjunqnaq) Sorex cinereus

== Chiroptera (ᐅᓐᓄᐊᖅᓯᐅᑦ, unnuaqsiut) ==
- Vespertilionidae (ᐃᓴᕈᕐᓗᒃᑐᑦ)
  - Hoary bat (ᕐᑭᖑᔭᖅ ᑎᒻᒥᓲᖅ ᐊᕕᙵᐅᔭᖅ) Lasiurus cinereus
  - Little brown myotis (ᒥᑭᔪᖅ ᑲᔪᖅ ᑎᒻᒥᓲᖅ ᐊᕕᙵᐅᔭᖅ) Myotis lucifugus

== Cetacea ==
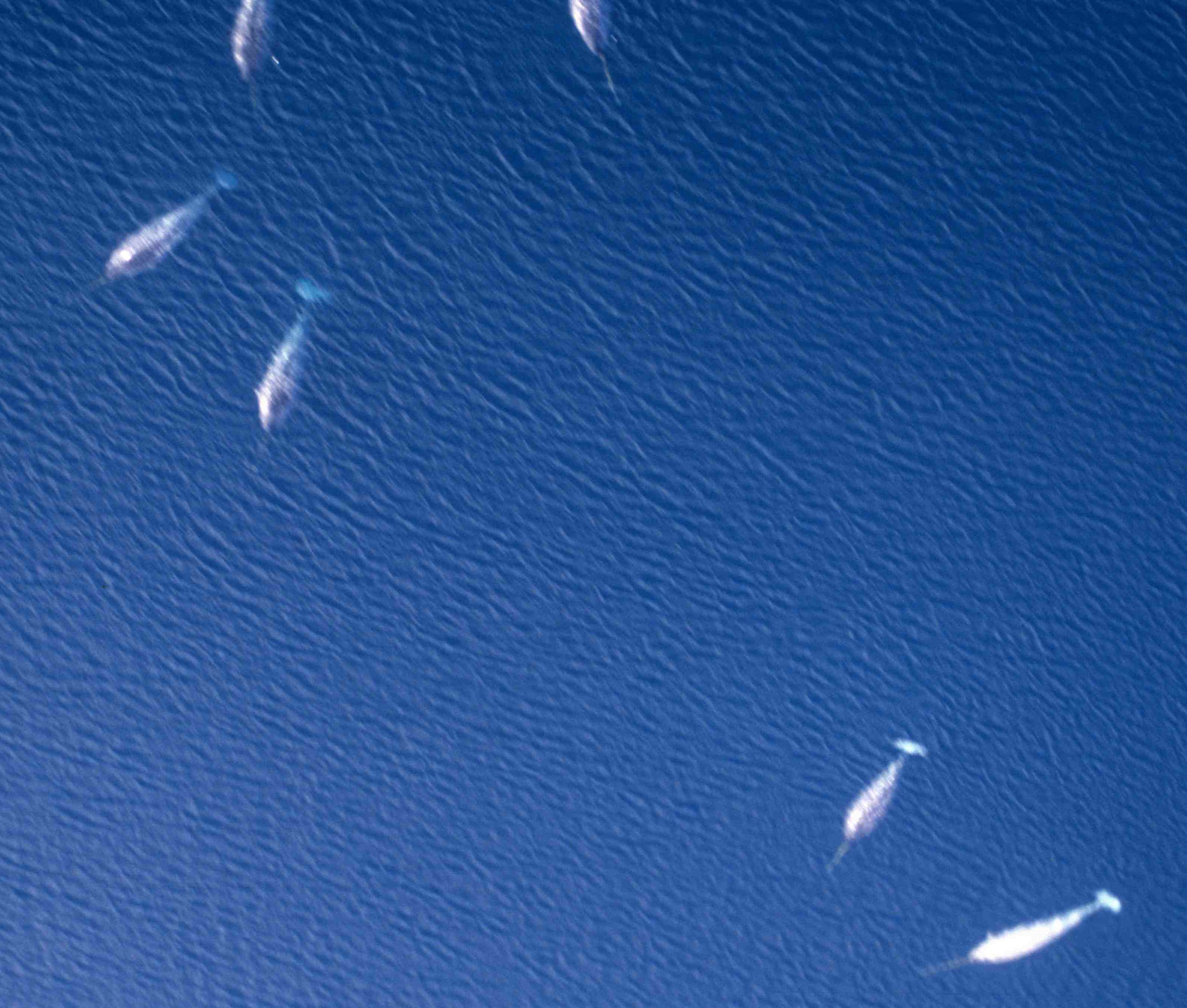
Narwhals

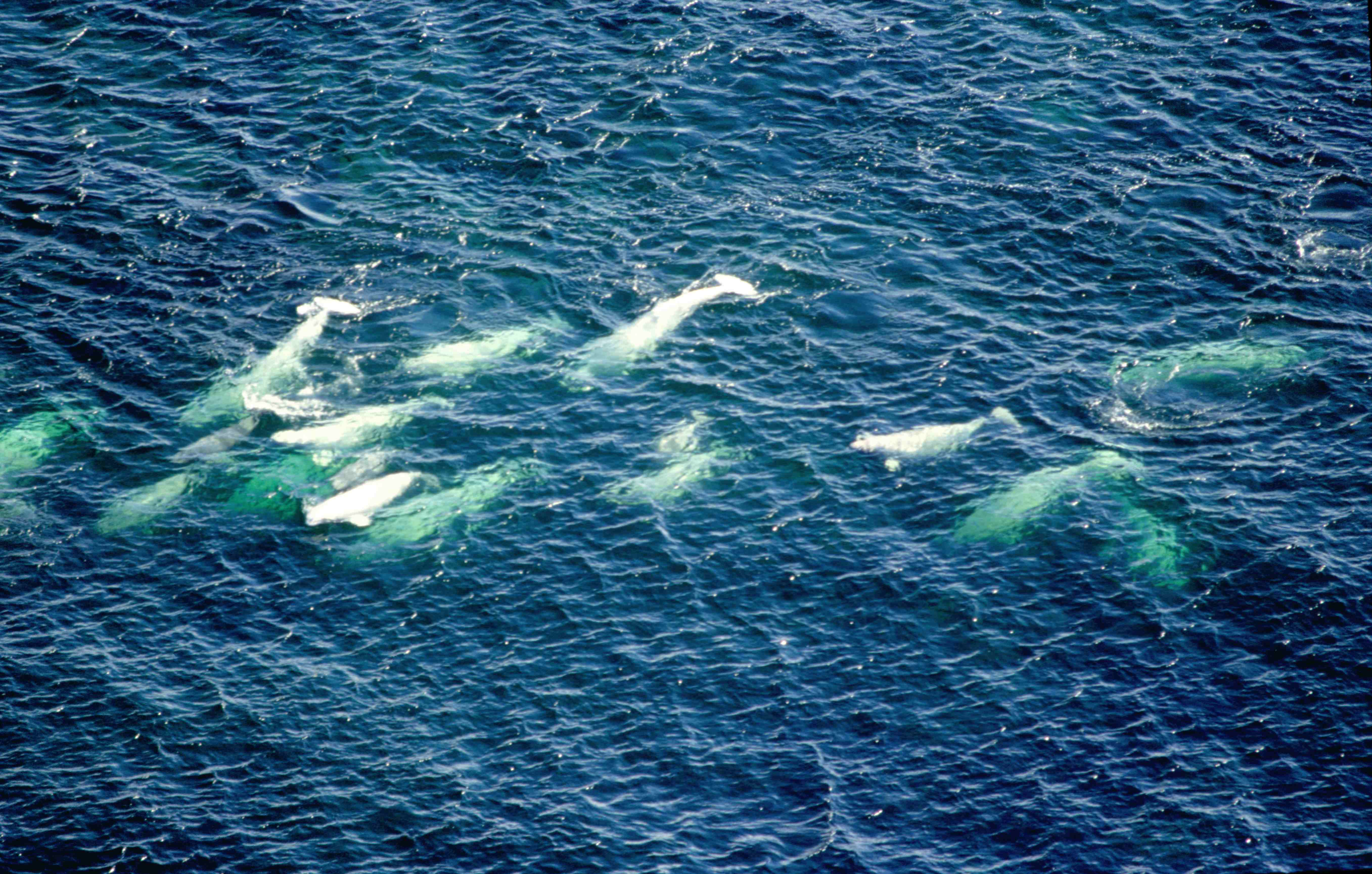
Beluga whales

- Balaenidae
  - Bowhead whale (ᐊᕐᕕᖅ, arviq) Balaena mysticetus
- Balaenopteridae
  - Fin whale, Balaenoptera physalus
  - Sei whale, Balaenoptera borealis
  - Blue whale (ᐊᕐᕕᖅ ᓂᐊᖁᕐᓗᖕᓂᖅᓴᖅ, ᐃᐸᒃ, arviq niaqurlungniqsaq, ipak) Balaenoptera musculus
  - Common minke whale, Balaenoptera acutorostrata
  - Humpback whale, Megaptera novaeangliae
- Delphinidae
  - Killer whale (ᐋᕐᓗ, ᐊᕐᓗᒃ, ᐋᕐᓗᒃ, aarlu, arluk, aarluk) Orcinus orca
  - Long-finned pilot whale
  - White-beaked dolphin
- Monodontidae
  - Narwhal (ᑑᒑᓕᒃ, tuugaalik, ᕿᓚᓗᒐᖅ ᑑᒑᓕᒃ, qilalugaq tuugaalik) Monodon monoceros
  - Beluga whale (ᕿᓇᓗᒐᖅ, qilalugaq) Delphinapterus leucas
    - Cumberland Sound beluga
- Phocoenidae
  - Harbour porpoise, Phocoena phocoena
- Physeteridae
  - Sperm whale (ᑭᒍᑎᓕᒃ, kigutilik) Physeter macrocephalus
- Ziphiidae
  - Northern bottlenose whale, Hyperoodon ampullatus

== See also ==
- List of birds of Nunavut
