= Signe Rink =

Danish writer and ethnologist (1836–1909)

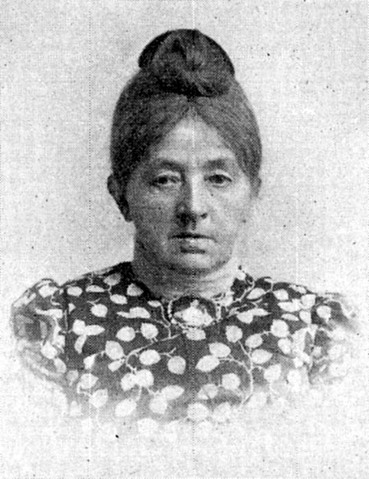
Signe Rink

Nathalie Sophia Nielsine Caroline Rink (née Møller; 24 January 1836 – 19 April 1909) was a Danish writer and ethnologist. Together with her husband Hinrich, she founded Greenland's first newspaper, Atuagagdliutit, in 1861. She is credited as being the first woman to publish works on Greenland and its culture.

== Biography ==
Born on 24 January 1836 in Paamiut, Nathalie Sophia Nielsine Caroline Møller was the daughter of the Danish colonial administrator Jørgen Nielsen Møller (1801–62) and his wife Antonette Ernestine Constance Tommerup (1813–91). She was brought up in Greenland until about 1850 when she was sent to school in Denmark. When she was just 17, she married the Danish geographer and Greenland researcher Hinrich Rink. The couple lived in Greenland where Hinrich became government inspector in Nuuk. They associated with people such as the linguist Samuel Kleinschmidt and the educator Carl Janssen who were interested in the Greenlanders and their culture.

In 1868, Rink left Greenland as her husband was suffering from poor health. They took with them a collection of illustrations of folk tales depicting the everyday lives of native Greenlanders created by Aron of Kangeq in which Signe Rink had taken a special interest. She later donated the collection to the National Museum of Denmark. Aron's watercolours, which also formed an important part of the collection, were rediscovered in 1960 and transferred to the National Museum of Greenland.

After first settling in Copenhagen, they moved to Kristiania in 1883. It was here that Signe Rink found time to write, publishing Grønlændere (1886), Grønlændere og Danske i Grønland (1887), Koloni-Idyller fra Grønland (1888) and Fra det Grønland der gik (1902).

Signe Rink died in Oslo on 19 April 1909. She was survived by her only daughter.

== Publications ==
Several of Rink's books and short stories are available in English. These include:

- Rink, Signe (June 1898). "The Girl and the Dogs—an Eskimo folk-tale with comments". American Anthropologist (6): 181–187. doi:10.1525/aa.1898.11.6.02a00030.
- Rink, Signe (2014). Eden of the North. International Polar Institute Press. ISBN 978-0-9829155-6-1. - Translation of Koloni-Idyller fra Grønland (1888)
- Rink, Signe (2016). Kayakmen: Tales of Greenland's Seal Hunters. International Polar Institute. ISBN 978-0-9961938-4-9. - Translation of Kayakmænd (1896)
