= The Rink =

The Rink may refer to:

- The Rink (film), a 1916 Charlie Chaplin film
- The Rink (musical), a 1984 Kander and Ebb musical
- The Rink (Indianapolis, Indiana), listed on the U.S. National Register of Historic Places in Indianapolis, Indiana

== See also ==
- Rink (disambiguation)
