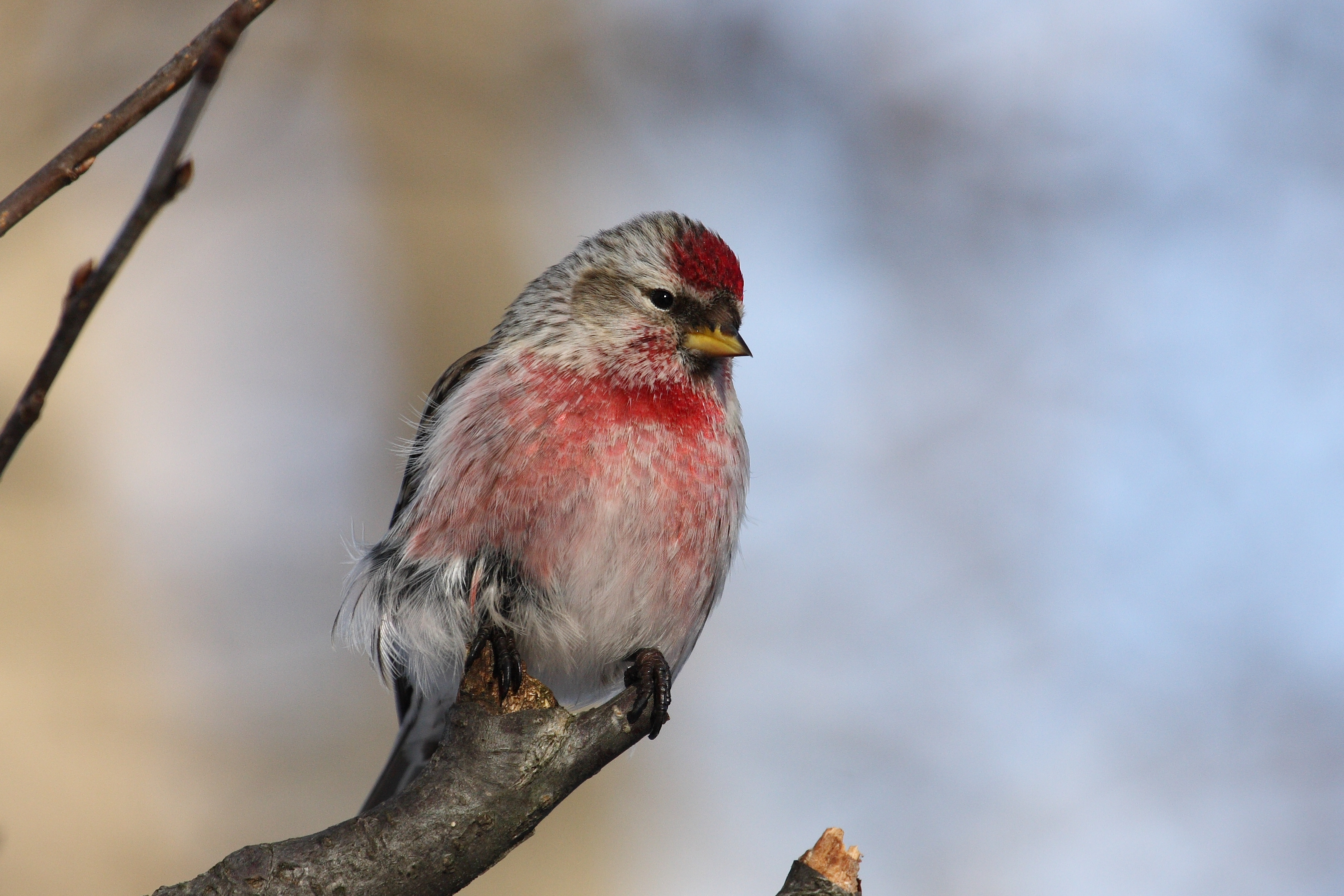
- Male, Quebec Canada

Conservation status
- Least Concern (IUCN 3.1)

Scientific classification
- Kingdom: Animalia
- Phylum: Chordata
- Class: Aves
- Order: Passeriformes
- Family: Fringillidae
- Subfamily: Carduelinae
- Genus: Acanthis; Borkhausen, 1797
- Species: A. flammea

Binomial name
- Acanthis flammea (Linnaeus, 1758)
- Range Breeding Year-round Nonbreeding

= Redpoll =

Species of bird

The redpoll (Acanthis flammea) is a species of small passerine bird in the finch family Fringillidae. It is the only species placed in the genus Acanthis. It breeds in the Arctic and north temperate Holarctic tundra and taiga. The redpoll was formerly widely treated as three species: the common or mealy redpoll, the arctic or hoary redpoll (A. hornemanni), and the lesser redpoll (A. cabaret).

== Taxonomy ==
The redpoll was listed in 1758 by the Swedish naturalist Carl Linnaeus in the 10th edition of his Systema Naturae under the binomial name Fringilla flammea. The specific epithet flammea is Latin meaning "flame-coloured". Linnaeus also described the redpoll as Fringilla linaria on the same page, but the earlier name flammea has priority.

The redpoll was previously placed in the genus Carduelis. Molecular phylogenetic studies showed that it formed a distinct lineage, so it was moved to the resurrected genus Acanthis that had been introduced in 1797 by the German naturalist Moritz Balthasar Borkhausen. The genus name Acanthis is from Ancient Greek akanthis, a name for a small now-unidentifiable bird.

Five subspecies are recognised:

- A. f. flammea (Linnaeus, 1758) – north Europe, Siberia, Alaska and Canada
- A. f. rostrata (Coues, 1861) – northeast Canada, Greenland and Iceland
- A. f. cabaret (Müller, PLS, 1776) – temperate west, central west Palearctic lowland (montane in south) birch and larch woods: British Isles, southwest Scandinavia east to north Germany and south Poland; south to southeast France, Austria and Czech Republic
- A. f. exilipes (Coues, 1862) – low (locally high) Arctic tundra birch and willow of north Eurasia, north Alaska and northwest Canada
- A. f. hornemanni (Holbøll, 1843) – low (locally high) Arctic tundra birch and willow of far northeast Canada and Greenland

The redpoll was formerly regarded as three separate species: the common redpoll with subspecies flammea and rostrata, the lesser redpoll with subspecies cabaret and the arctic redpoll with subspecies hornemanni and exilipes. The three species are now considered as conspecific based on the small genetic differences and the continuous phenotypic variation.

== Description ==
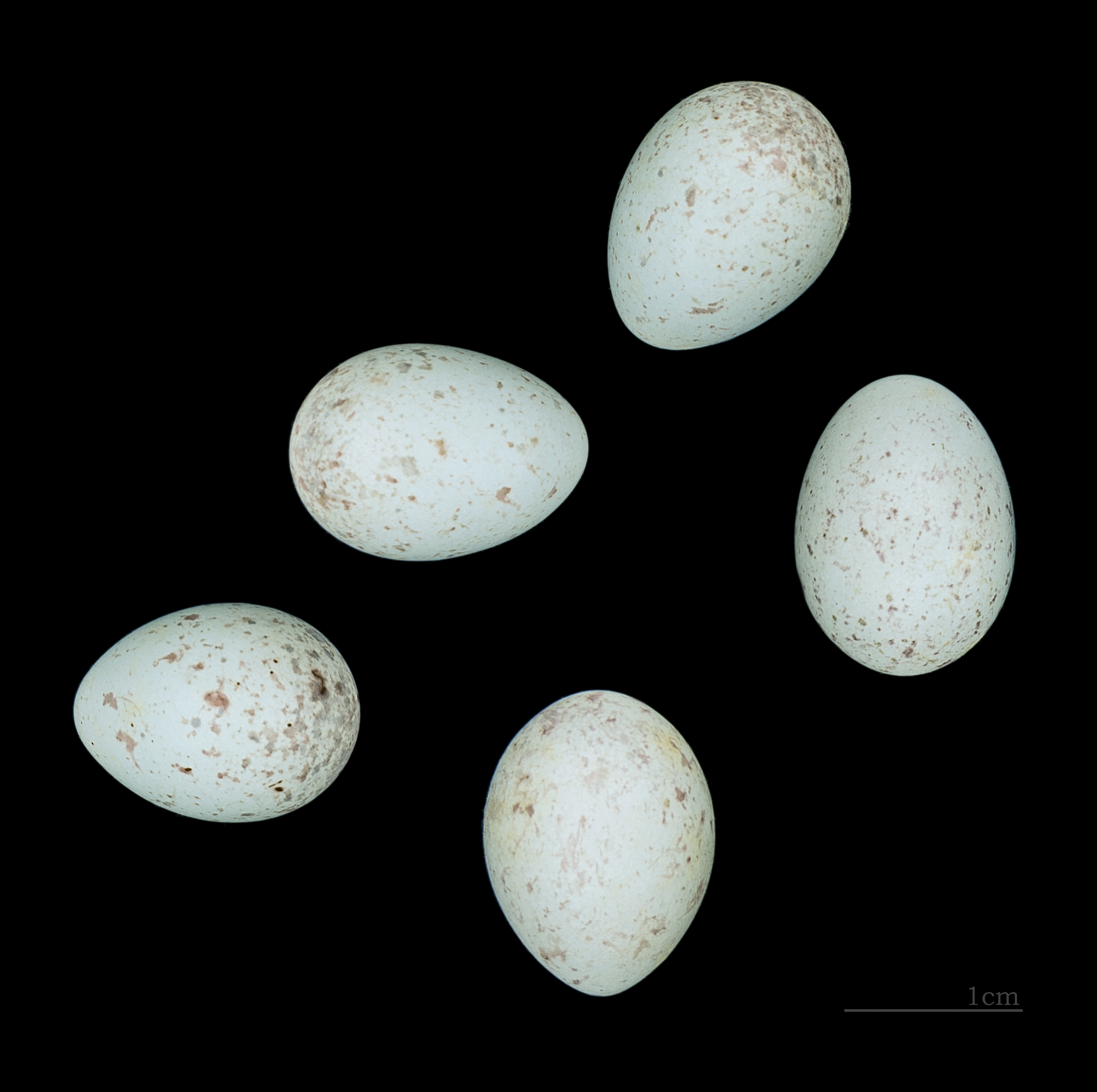
Eggs

The redpoll is a small brownish-grey finch with dark streaks and a bright red patch on its forehead. It has a black bib and two pale stripes on the wings. Males' breasts are often suffused with red. Adults measure between 11.5 and 14 centimetres (4.5 and 5.5 in) in length and weighing between 12 and 16 grams (0.42 and 0.56 oz). Wingspan ranges from 7.5 to 8.7 in (19–22 cm). The rump is streaked and there is a broad dark brown streak across the vent. It has brown legs, a dark-tipped yellowish bill and dark brown irises.

Calls from a flock of birds feeding, Iowa USA

Foraging redpoll filmed in Holland

== Distribution and habitat ==
The range of the redpoll extends through northern Europe and Asia to northern North America, Greenland and Iceland. It is a partial migrant, moving southward in late autumn and northward again in March and April. Its typical habitat is boreal forests of pines, spruces and larches. It feeds mainly on seeds, principally birch and alder seeds in the winter.

Redpolls, subspecies A. f. cabaret, were introduced into New Zealand between 1862 and 1875. They are now found throughout both the North and South Islands as well as on many outlying islands.

== Behaviour ==
=== Breeding ===
The redpoll first breed when they are one year old. The female builds the nest, accompanied by the male, often low down in a tree or bush. It has an outer layer of thin twigs, a middle layer of root fibres, fragments of juniper bark and lichens and an inner layer of down, wool and hair. Three to seven speckled eggs are laid. The eggs are 16.9 mm × 12.6 mm (0.67 in × 0.50 in) with a calculated weight of 1.4 g (0.049 oz). They are incubated by the female and hatch after about 11 days. The young are cared for by both parents but are brooded only by the female. The chicks fledge when aged around 13 days. Generally two broods are raised each year.

=== Food and feeding ===
The diet is mostly very small seeds, especially those from birch trees (Betula). In the breeding season some invertebrates are also eaten. It forages mainly in trees but will occasionally forage on the ground.

== Gallery ==
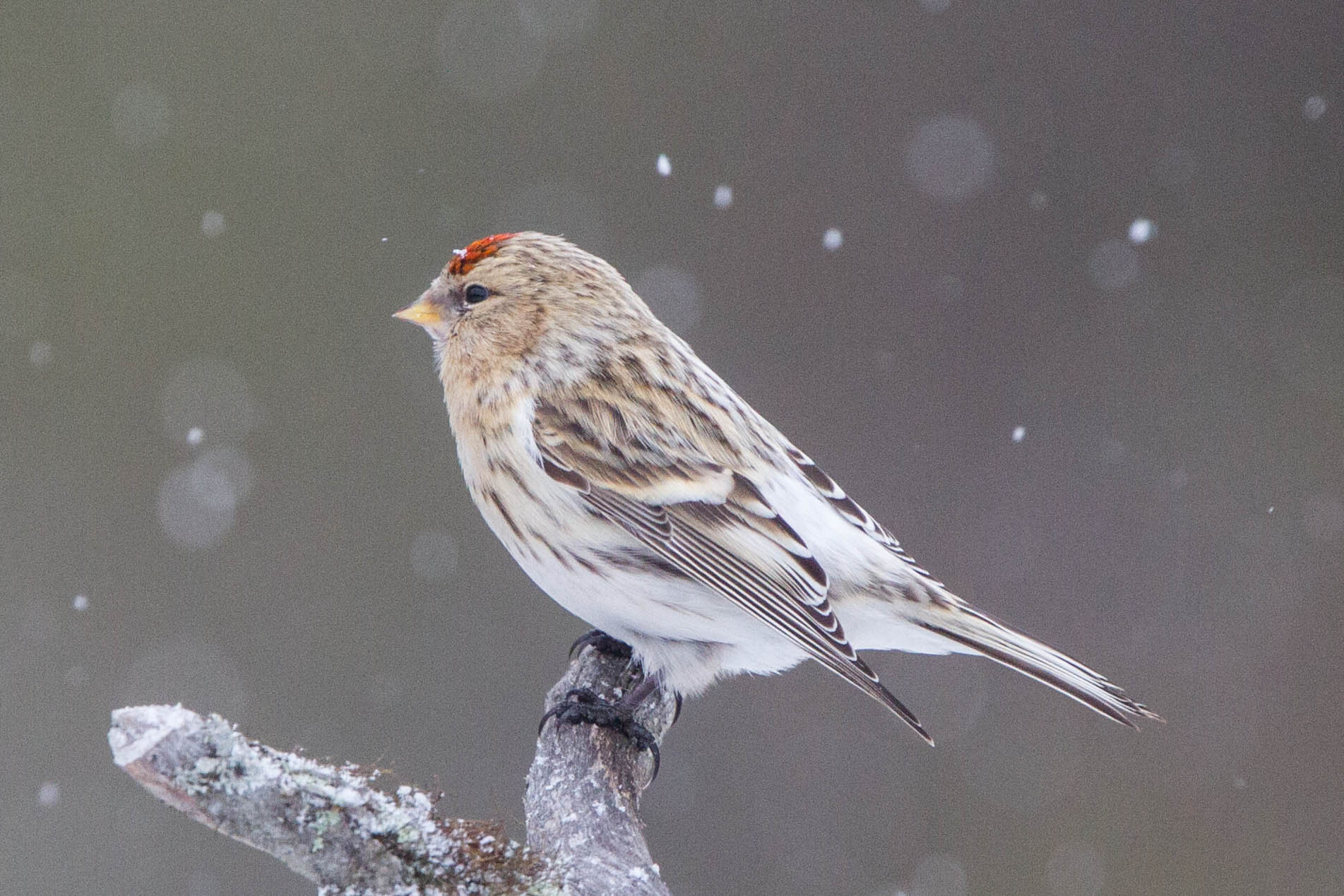
A. f. hornemanni

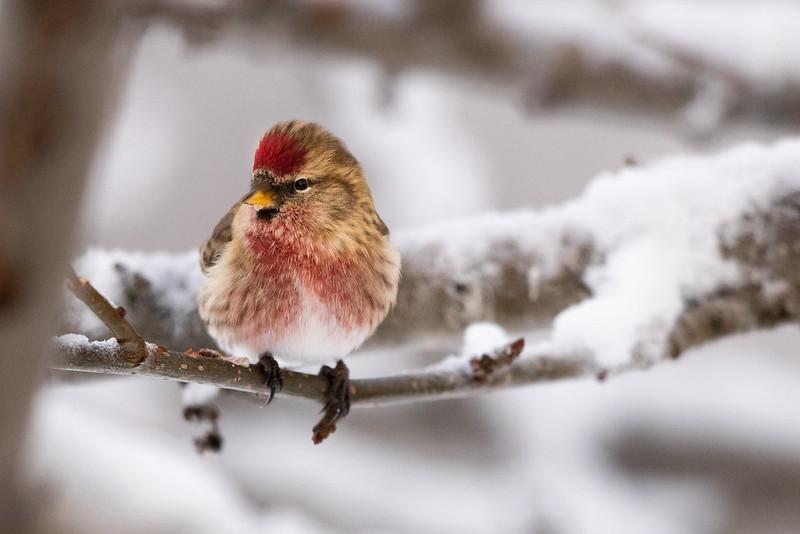
Kenai National Wildlife Refuge, Alaska

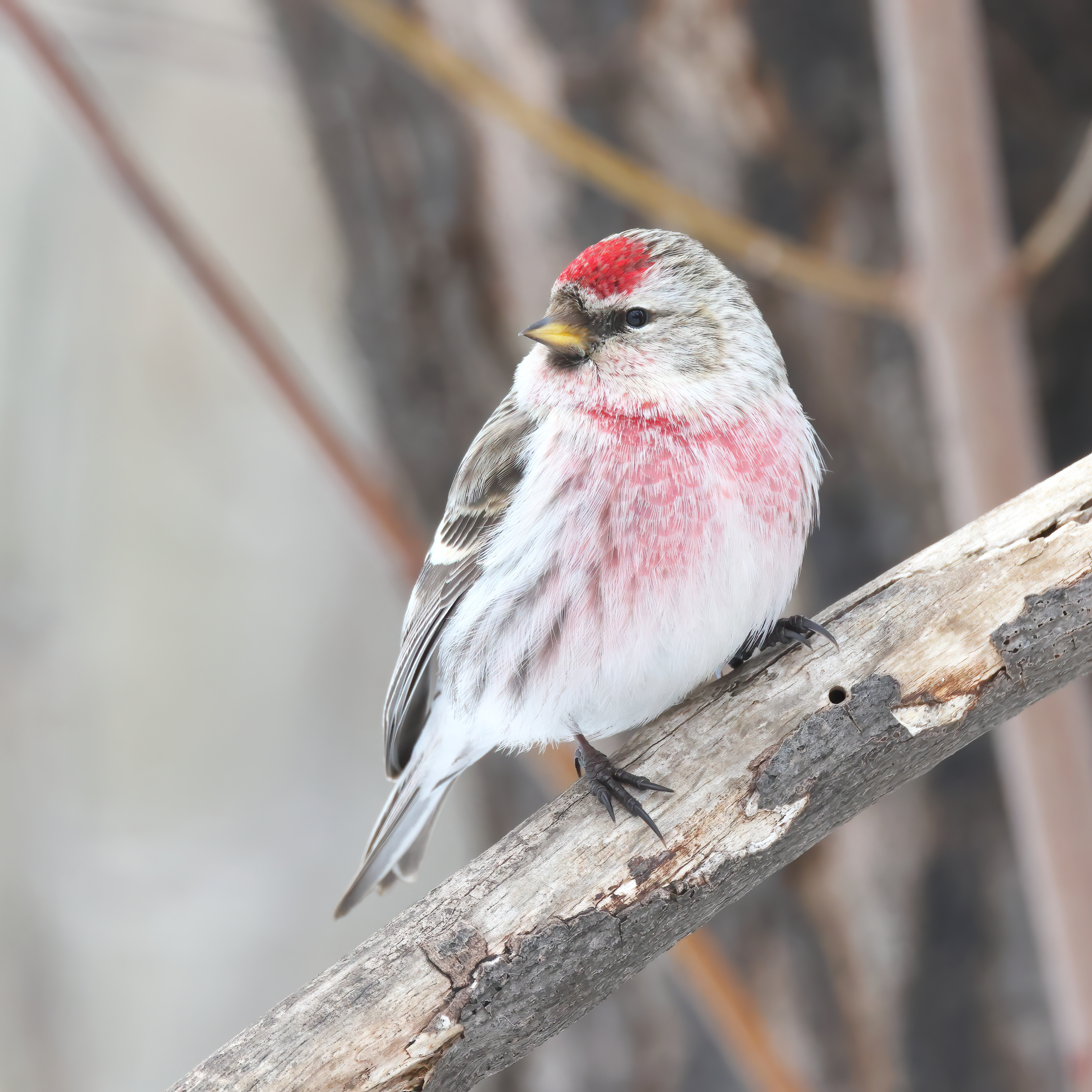
A. f. flammea, Quebec, Canada

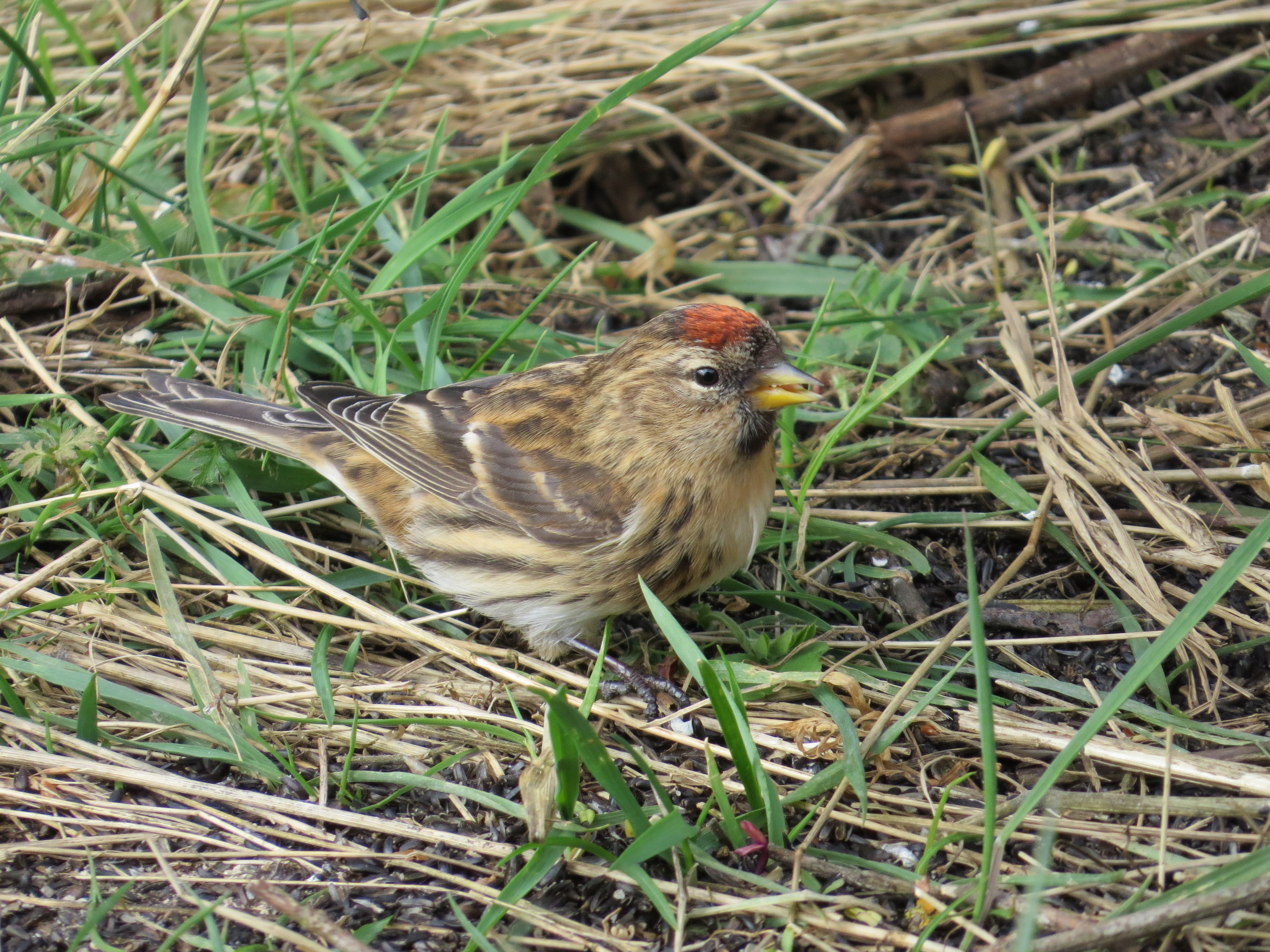
A. f. cabaret, Northumberland, England

== Sources ==
- Cramp, Stanley; et al., eds. (1994). "Carduelis flammea Redpoll". Handbook of the Birds of Europe the Middle East and North Africa. The Birds of the Western Palearctic. Vol. VIII: Crows to Finches. Oxford: Oxford University Press. pp. 639–661. ISBN 978-0-19-854679-5.
