= Atuagagdliutit/Grønlandsposten =

Newspaper in Greenland

- Type: biweekly
- Founded: January 1, 1861 (as Atuagagdliutit)
- Language: West Greenlandic, Danish
- Headquarters: Qullilerfik 2, 3900 Nuuk
- Country: Greenland (Denmark)

Atuagagdliutit/Grønlandsposten, usually referred to as AG, is one of the two newspapers in Greenland distributed nationwide. The newspaper is published twice a week on Tuesdays and Thursdays.

The newspaper was created by a merger of a Kalaallisut newspaper (Atuagagdliutit) and a Danish newspaper (Grønlandsposten) and all articles are printed in both languages.

== Atuagagdliutit ==
Atuagagdliutit was started in 1861 by the Danish geologist, inspector Hinrich Johannes Rink, who thought the Inuit population of Greenland was losing its cultural identity and a newspaper might stimulate the Greenlandic oral tradition by creating the opportunity to print and publish tales about life nationwide. The newspaper was at first published exclusively in Kalaallisut and was primarily concerned with the Inuit identity.

The first issue was published on January 1, 1861. It consisted of eight large-format pages (broadsheet), divided into 16 columns. A pioneering initiative on a European scale was the inclusion of illustrations: woodcuts, drawings, and paintings printed in full color. The print run was 300 copies, and the newspaper was distributed free of charge.

The newspaper was for many years also the only window to the outside world for the majority of the Inuit population. It is claimed that a colour illustration published in Atuagagdliutit in 1861, a woodcut showing the American navy visiting Nuuk, was the first ever newspaper color illustration.

During the 1930s, the newspaper gradually changed away from the focus on tales and towards social problems and other ordinary news.

== Grønlandsposten ==
During World War II, Greenland was largely isolated from the outside world, and therefore a Danish language newspaper was circulated in the Greenland capital Nuuk (Godthåb) by the name of Grønlandsposten. The newspaper became popular enough to be distributed after the end of World War II and it was distributed until 1952 when the two papers merged.

== Distribution ==
The old Atuagagdliutit was for many years published monthly, and that pattern continued after the merger with Grønlandsposten. From the 1960s, the newspaper became published every fortnight, and within few years, the newspaper became published once every week, then twice a week, and then three times a week. In 1993, the newspaper was once again published only twice a week, mainly because of distribution problems.

== 2010 merger ==
In 2010 Atuagagdliutit/Grønlandsposten merged with Sermitsiaq, the other Greenlandic newspaper. Both papers' websites now redirect to the combined Sermitsiaq.AG website. (Note: The domain .ag is for Antigua and Barbuda; its use here is a domain hack for AG.)

== See also ==
- List of newspapers in Greenland
