= Hinrich Johannes Rink =

Danish geologist

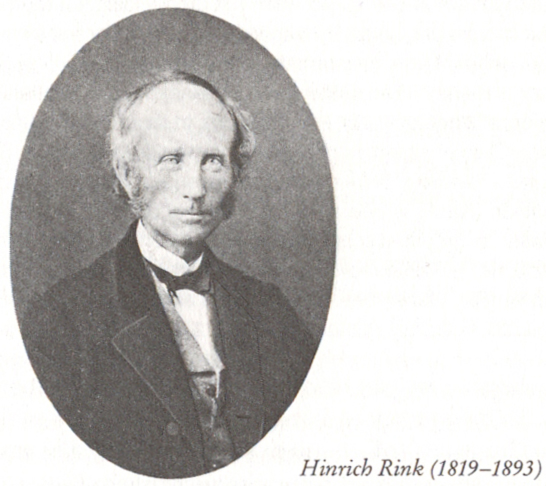
- Born: 26 August 1819; Copenhagen, Denmark
- Died: 15 December 1893 (aged 74); Christiania, Norway
- Education: University of Copenhagen; University of Kiel
- Known for: Founder of the first Kalaallisut language newspaper
- Awards: Silver medal, Royal Danish Academy of Sciences and Letters (1852)
- Scientific career
- Fields: Geology and Greenlandic research

Dr. Hinrich Johannes Rink (first name sometimes as Henrik) (26 August 1819 – 15 December 1893) was a Danish geologist, one of the pioneers of glaciology, and the first accurate describer of the inland ice of Greenland. Rink, who first came to Greenland in 1848, spent 16 winters and 22 summers in the Arctic region, and became notable for Greenland's development. Becoming a Greenlandic scholar and administrator, he served as Royal Inspector of South Greenland and went on to become Director of the Royal Greenland Trading Department. With "Forstanderskaber", Rink introduced the first steps towards Greenlandic home rule.

Rink carried out and printed in four volumes the first systematic collection of Greenlandic oral tradition stories. He was the founder of Atuagagdliutit, the first Kalaallisut language newspaper.

== Early years ==
Rink was born in Copenhagen to Holstein parents. His father was Johannes Rink (1783–1865), a Kiel, Germany merchant, and his mother was Agnese Margaretha (née Hedde) Rink (1793–1865); both were from Dithmarschen. He had a brother, Johan Jacob Rink (1815–1849).

Initially taught by a private teacher, he later went to study at the Sorø Academy. He studied physics and chemistry at the University of Kiel, receiving the university's Gold Medal in chemistry in 1843. For a time, he served as Assistant Professor under William Christopher Zeise. He graduated with a Ph.D. from the University of Copenhagen. Rink studied medicine during the winter of 1844–45, taking an anatomy course and listening to lectures in Berlin. He was often depressed and vacillated with regard to his future.

== Career ==
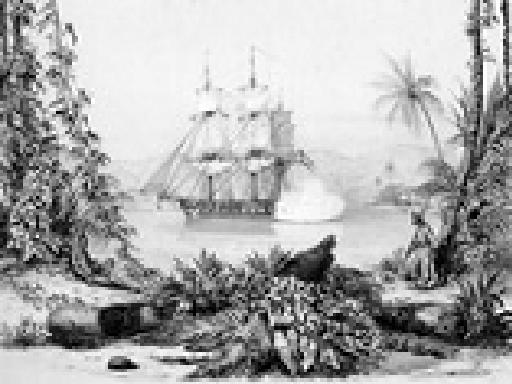
Rink was part of the expedition crew of the Galathea, depicted at the Nicobar Islands in 1846.

At the suggestion of Hans Christian Ørsted, it was in Berlin that he received an offer to participate as a mineralogist for the first of the Galathea expeditions aboard the frigate Galathea. The voyage lasted from 1845 through 1847. He was intent on going to Calcutta, but he ended up at the Nicobar Islands, colonized by Denmark at the time, to investigate them geographically. After five months he fell ill with Nicobar Fever, weakening him the rest of his life, and forcing his return to Denmark. On the return trip, he stopped in Cairo and Malta, where, in October 1846, he collected geological materials. In 1847, his first major geographical work, "The Nicobarese islands", was published.

From 1848 until 1851, with public support, he went to Western Greenland for geological and glaciological studies at Upernavik and Umanak. Here, he lived among the Kalaallit which gave him an opportunity to study them. But his objective was to create a map of Greenland based on the surveys that he performed and those of others. He was able to survey large areas of Western Greenland's fjords and their glaciers. In the last year, he spent some time in Ilulissat and sailed to Paakitsoq, a bay in Western Greenland. He travelled by sledge to Sermeq Kujalleq in the spring of 1851. He mapped the Greenland coast, and made the first geological map of it. Rink's surveys are notable as the first in a series of ice margin change surveys that have lasted over 150 years. Rink returned to Copenhagen in 1851 where he took a seat in a Commission that dealt with the trade monopoly in Greenland. On behalf of the Commission, he went back to Greenland in 1852, and subsequently published the book About the monopoly of trade in Greenland.

The following year, he entered the service of the monopoly trade and was the first colonial administrator in Godthaab and Julianehåb. He studied the Arctic Ocean ice, its origins, movement and composition and in 1853, he published his essay, On the spread and movement of ice over the North Greenland mainland. From 1857 to 1868, he was a royal inspector of South Greenland. During his years as a civil servant, he published his main work, Greenland and statistically described geography, which is the first standard work on Greenland after Hans Egede's "Perlustration" of 1729.

In 1855, Rink found the late 18th century printing press of missionary Jesper Brodersen and began printing small items, the first of which was a handbill dated 21 October 1855. Two years later, Rink acquired a small, Danish printing press and a lithographic press. Rink established a print shop in Godthaab in 1861, the South Greenland Press, and founded with his wife the first Greenlandic language newspaper, Atuagagdliutit (translation: "Readings"). Its first issue was published in January 1861, and it was published monthly thereafter. In addition to the newspaper, the print shop published pamphlets.

Rink actively cared for the welfare of the Inuit, with whom he had close contact. It was his idea and under his guidance, that the Commission's board members were introduced, which ensured Greenlanders' influence on their own affairs. In 1858, he called on local people to learn their artistic traditions. He helped discover and promote the artists Jens Kreutzmann and Aron of Kangeq. Rink studied the Greenlandic language and folklore; Eskimo tales and legends was published in 1866.

In 1868, forced to leave Greenland for health reasons, Rink again returned to Copenhagen. From 1871 until 1882, he served as Director of the Royal Greenland Trading Department. In that capacity, he headed the Greenlandic trade administration. In Copenhagen, he founded the Grønlænderhjem for young Inuit to learn a craft so they could more easily obtain employment.

Rink was a Corresponding Member of the Royal Geographical Society. He received the Silver Medal from the Royal Danish Academy of Sciences and Letters in 1852.

== Personal life ==
Kalatdlit asavai ilisimavai. (translation: "He loved and knew Kalaallit Inuit (Greenlanders).") Inscription on a memorial plaque in Godthaab.

—

Rink, tall and thin, was almost emaciated in frame. In 1853, he married Sophia Nathalie Nielsine Caroline Møller (born 1836, Godthaab), nicknamed Signe. Signe was born and raised in Greenland. She was the daughter of Paamiut colonial administrators Jørgen Nielsen Møller and Antonette Ernestine Constance Tommerup. Signe published short stories about the lives and problems of Greenlanders. She is considered to be the first woman who wrote about Greenlandic culture. She was also instrumental in preserving the works, woodcuts and watercolors of Jens Kreutzmann and Aron of Kangeq.

Little is written about Rink's children; there may have been three. As their only daughter, Antoinette Margrethe Rink (b. 1855) moved to Christiania, Norway, Rink and his wife retired there in 1882, and he finished his last work. Rink died in 1893 as the leading expert of his day on Greenland. A memorial built of stone in Godthaab contains a plaque with the inscription kalatdlit asavai ilisimavai (translation: "He loved and knew Kalaallit Inuit (Greenlanders)").

== Legacy ==
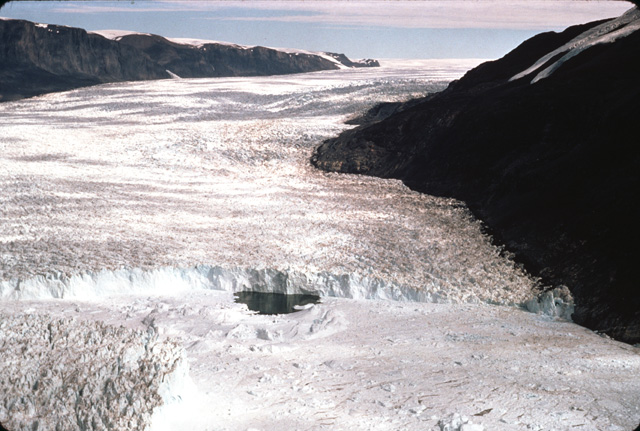
Rink Glacier, northwest Greenland

The Hinrich Rink collection of over 140 manuscript maps also includes cards upon which he and others had drawn. It is now in the Royal Danish Library.

Rink Glacier (Kangilliup Sermia) and Rink Glacier (Melville Bay) in northwest Greenland are named in his honor. The HJ Rinksvej is one of the main streets in the urban centre of Nuuk.

== Partial works ==
- Danish Greenland : its people and products
- The Danish trade areas in North Greenland, their geographic nature and productive industry sources ("De danske handelsdistrikter i Nordgrønland, deres geographiske beskaffenhed og produktive erhvervskilder", in Danish)
- The East Greenland dialect according to the annotations made by The Danish East Coast Expedition to Kleinschmidt's Greenlandic Dictionary
- The Eskimo tribes : their distributions and characteristics, especially in regard to language, with a comparative vocabulary and a sketch-map
- The girl and the dogs : further comments
- Greenland, geographically and statistically described
- Greenlanders and Danes in Greenland
- The interior of Greenland and the opportunity to travel the same
- The Origin of the Eskimo as traced by their Language.
- The Reason Why Greenlanders and Similar People Living by Hunting Decline Materially Through Contact with Europeans
- Tales and traditions of the Eskimo: with a sketch of their habits, religion, language and other peculiarities
- The Danish trade areas in North Greenland, their geographic nature and productive industry sources ("De danske handelsdistrikter i Nordgrønland, deres geographiske beskaffenhed og produktive erhvervskilder", in Danish)
