= Rink Glacier =

Glacier in Greenland

- Kangilliup Sermia; Rink Isbræ
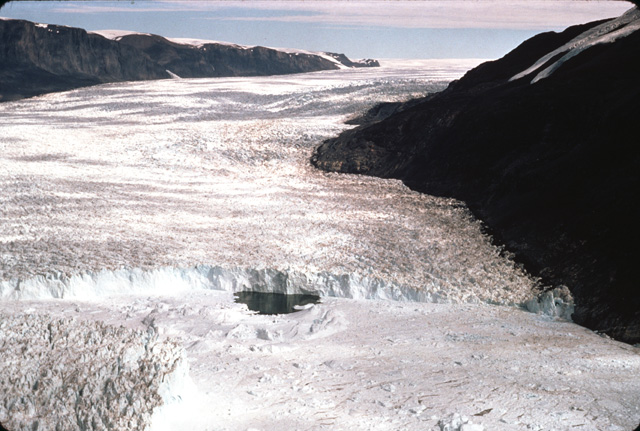
- Photograph of Rink Glacier

- Location within Greenland
- Location: Avannaata, Greenland
- Coordinates: 71°45′N 051°40′W
- Terminus: Karrat Fjord, Baffin Bay, North Atlantic Ocean

Rink Glacier (Danish: Rink Isbræ; Greenlandic: Kangilliup Sermia) is a glacier in Avannaata, Greenland.

This glacier is named in honor of Hinrich Johannes Rink, Danish geologist and Greenlandic researcher.

== Geography ==
The Rink Glacier is the largest glacier on the west coast of Greenland. Its terminus is in the Karrat Fjord, Nordost Bay, Baffin Bay, North Atlantic Ocean.

It drains an area of 30,182 km^{2} (11,653 sq mi) of the Greenland Ice Sheet with a flux (quantity of ice moved from the land to the sea) of 12.1 km^{3} (2.9 cu mi) per year, as measured for 1996. As reported by Anker Weidick and Ole Bennike in 2007, it is ranked second or third in iceberg production in western Greenland. It is also the swiftest moving and highest surface ice in the world.

== See also ==
- List of glaciers in Greenland
