= Botany of the Faeroes =

Botany of the Færöes (based upon Danish investigations) – a three-volume classic scientific work on flora and vegetation of the Faroe Islands, including fungi, lichens, algae, bryophytes and vascular plants. It was published 1901 to 1908 and funded by the Carlsberg Foundation. The project was initiated by Eugen Warming, who edited the content. The published work was based on investigations made chiefly between 1895 and 1900 by F. Børgesen, C. Jensen, C.H. Ostenfeld, J. Hartz, H. Jónsson and Eug. Warming. Contemporary reviews were positive.

Warming, E. ed. (1901-1908) Botany of the Færöes (based upon Danish investigations), vol. I-III.

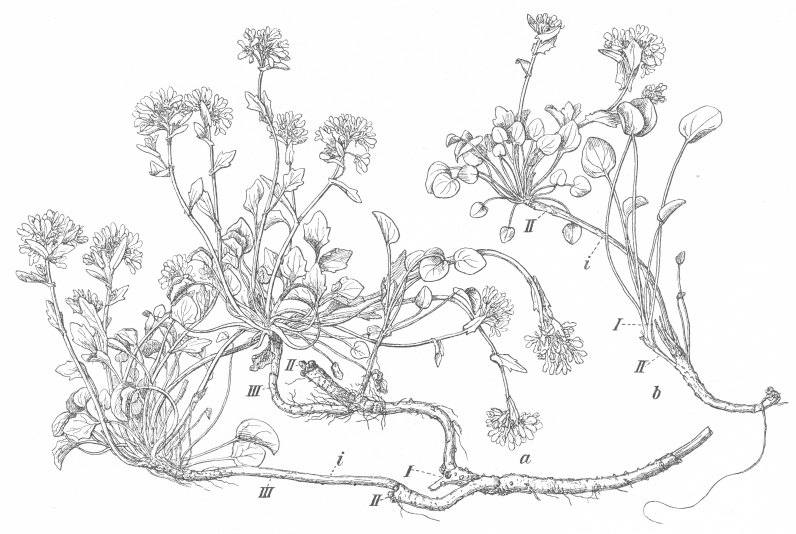
From Ostenfeld's "The land-vegetation of the Færöes", Fig. 171 "Perennial specimens of Cochlearia officinalis from a wet rock-ledge at Trangisvaag on Syderö, 9th May 1895. I. Stem-rudiments from the first period of flowering. II. from the second period. III. stem with flowering scapes of the third period. i. long internodes. a. specimen at least 4 years old, probably 5 years. b. specimen at least 3 years old, probably 4 years."

== Contents ==
- Part I (1901), pp. 1–338. Det nordiske Forlag, Copenhagen & John Wheldon & Co., London. Full text
  - Warming, E.; Historical notes on the botanical investigations of the Færöes. pp. 1–5.
  - Ostenfeld, C.H.; Geography and topography. pp. 6–19.
  - Ostenfeld, C.H.; Industrial conditions. pp. 20–23.
  - Ostenfeld, C.H.; Geology. pp. 24–31.
  - Ostenfeld, C.H.; Climate. pp. 32–40.
  - Ostenfeld, C.H.; Flora of the Færöes: Phanerogamae and Pteridophyta. pp. 41–99.
  - Ostenfeld, C.H.; Phyto-geographical studies based upon observations of "Phanerogamae and Pteridiphyta". pp. 100–119.
  - Jensen, C.; Bryophyta. pp. 120–184.
  - Jensen, C.; Phyto-geographical studies based upon the Bryophyta. Pp. 185–197.
  - Børgesen, F.; Freshwater algæ. pp. 198–259.
  - Østrup, E.; Freshwater diatoms. pp. 260–290.
  - Østrup, E.; Phyto-geographical studies based upon the freshwater diatoms. pp. 291–304.
  - Rostrup, E.; Fungi. pp 301–316.
  - Deichmann Branth, J.S.; Lichenes. pp. 317–338.
- Part II (1903), pp. 339–681. Det nordiske Forlag Ernst Bojesen, Copenhagen. Full text
  - Børgesen, F.; Marine algæ. pp. 339–532. [reprinted in "Algae of the Faeröes" by Linnaeus Press, Amsterdam 1970, 374 pp.]
  - Østrup, E.; diatoms from the marine algæ. pp. 533–558.
  - Ostenfeld, C.H.; Phytoplankton from the sea around the Færöes. pp. 558–612.
  - Børgesen, F. & Ostenfeld, C.H.; Phytoplankton of lakes in the Færöes. pp. 613–624.
  - Dahlstedt, H. The Hieracia from the Færöes. pp. 625–659.
  - Warming, E.; The history of the flora of the Færöes. pp. 660–681.

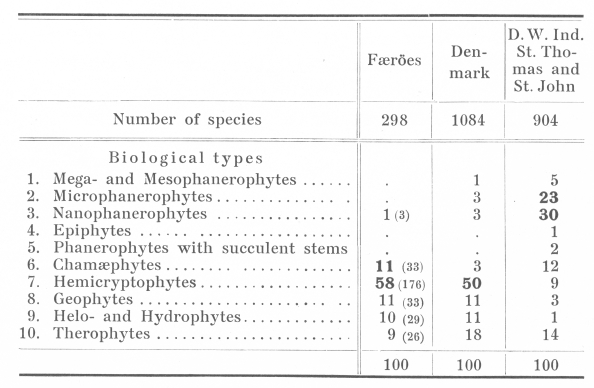
From Ostenfeld's "The land-vegetation of the Færöes", Table comparing Raunkiær plant life-form spectra of the floras of the Faroe Islands, Denmark proper and the Danish West Indies.

- Part III (1908), pp. 683–1070 + i-xxviii. Gyldenske Boghandel - Nordisk Forlag, Copenhagen and Christiania & John Wheldon & Co., London. Full text
  - Børgesen, F.; The algæ-vegetation of the Færöese coasts, with remarks on the phyto-geography. pp. 683–834. [reprinted in "Algae of the Faeröes" by Linnaeus Press, Amsterdam 1970, 374 pp.]
  - Ostenfeld, C.H.; Additions and corrections to the list of the Phanerogamae and Pteridophyta of the Færöes. pp. 835–863.
  - Patursson, Gazet; List of popular plant names from the Færöes. pp. 864–866.
  - Ostenfeld, C.H.; The land-vegetation of the Færöes, with special reference to the higher plants. pp. 867–1026.
  - Børgesen, F.; Gardening and tree-planting. pp. 1027–1043.
  - Feilberg, P.; Some notes on the agriculture of the Færöes. pp. 1044–1054.
  - Warming, E.; Field-notes on the biology of some of the flowers of the Færöes. pp. 1055–1065.
  - Nielsen, I.C.; The insect-fauna of the Færöes. pp. 1066–1070.
  - Børgesen, F. & Jónsson, H.; The distribution of the marine algæ of the Arctic Sea and of the northernmost part of the Atlantic. Appendix pp. i-xxviii. [reprinted in "Algae of the Faeröes" by Linnaeus Press, Amsterdam 1970, 374 pp.]

== See also ==
- Flora of the Faroe Islands
- The Botany of Iceland
- Flora (publication)
