= The Botany of Iceland =

1912–1949 five-volume work

The Botany of Iceland is a five-volume classic scientific work on flora and vegetation of Iceland. It includes fungi, lichen, algae, bryophytes, and vascular plants.

== History ==
It was published 1912 to 1949 and funded by the Carlsberg Foundation. The project was initiated by Eugenius Warming and Lauritz Kolderup Rosenvinge, who edited the first three volumes, but it was continued after their deaths.

== Volumes ==
- Volume 1 (1912–18), edited by Lauritz Kolderup Rosenvinge and Eugenius Warming, J. Frimodt, Copenhagen, and John Wheldon and Co., London.
  - Part I
    - 1. Helgi Jónsson (1912) The marine algal vegetation of Iceland. pp. 1–186.
    - 2. Þorvaldur Thoroddsen (1914) An account of the physical geography of Iceland. pp. 187–344.
  - Part II
    - 3. Ernst Østrup (1916) Marine diatoms from the coasts of Iceland. pp. 345–394.
    - 4. August Hesselbo (1918) The bryophyta of Iceland. pp. 395–677.
- Volume 2 (1918–20), edited by Lauritz Kolderup Rosenvinge and Eugenius Warming, J. Frimodt, Copenhagen, and John Wheldon and Co., London.
  - Part I
    - 5. Ernst Østrup (1918) Fresh-water diatoms from Iceland. pp. 1–100.
    - 6. Olaf Galløe (1919–20) The lichen flora of Iceland. pp. 101–247.
  - Part II (1928–1932)
    - 7. Johannes Boye Petersen (1928) The fresh-water Cyanophyceæ of Iceland. pp. 251–324.
    - 8. Johannes Boye Petersen (1928) The aerial algæ of Iceland. pp. 325–447.
    - 9. Poul Larsen (1932) The fungi of Iceland. pp. 451–607.
- Volume 3 (1930–45)
  - Part 1, edited by Lauritz Kolderup Rosenvinge and Eugenius Warming.
    - 10. Hans Mølholm Hansen (1930) Studies on the vegetation of Iceland. pp. 1–186. J. Frimodt, Copenhagen.
  - Part 2, edited by Johannes Grøntved, Ove Paulsen and Thorvald Sørensen. Einar Munksgaard, Copenhagen.
    - 11. M.P. Christiansen (1941) Studies in the larger fungi of Iceland. pp. 191–227.
  - Part 3, edited by Johannes Grøntved, Ove Paulsen and Thorvald Sørensen. Einar Munksgaard, Copenhagen.
    - 12. M.P. Christiansen (1942) The Taraxacum-flora of Iceland. pp. 229–343 + 44 plates.
  - Part 4, edited by Johannes Grøntved, Ove Paulsen and Thorvald Sørensen. Einar Munksgaard, Copenhagen.
    - 14. Steindór Steindórsson (1945) Studies on the vegetation of the Central Highland of Iceland. pp. 345–547.
- Volume 4 (1942), edited by Johannes Grøntved, Ove Paulsen and Thorvald Sørensen. Einar Munksgaard, Copenhagen.
  - Part 1
    - 13. Johannes Grøntved (1942) The pteridophyta and spermatophyta of Iceland. pp. 1–427.
- Volume 5 (1949), edited by Johannes Grøntved and Thorvald Sørensen. Einar Munksgaard, Copenhagen, and Oxford University Press, Oxford.
  - Part 1
    - 15. Emil Hadač (1949) The flora of Reykjanes peninsula, SW Iceland. pp. 1–57.

== See also ==
- Flora of Iceland
- Botany of the Faeroes
- Flora (publication)
