= August Hesselbo =

Danish pharmaceutical botanist and bryologist

Christen August Hesselbo (1 March 1874 – 1952) was a Danish pharmaceutical botanist and bryologist.

== Selected scientific works ==
- The bryophes of Iceland . The Botany of Iceland, edited by L. Kolderup Rosenvinge & E. Warming, J. Frimodt, Copenhagen, and John Wheldon and Co., London; Vol. 1, Part 2, pp. 395–677. 1918.
- Mosses from Clavering Ø and the surrounding areas. Meddelelser om Grønland vol. 116 (6). 1948.
- Mosses from North-East Greenland (Lat. 77° N.). Meddelelser om Grønland vol. 128 (3). 1948.
