= Henning Eiler Petersen =

Danish mycologist, botanist and marine biologist

Henning Eiler (Ejler) Petersen (22 August 1877 – 22 May 1946) was a Danish mycologist, botanist and marine biologist. He made a major contribution to unveiling the mysterious die-back of eel grass in Northern European waters in the early 20th century as a pathogen outbreak.

Petersen's main research was in what was then known as lower fungi – Chytridiomycota and Oomycetes, but he also studied the systematics of Red algae. Parallel to these lines of research, he investigated the intraspecific morphological variation in plant species – which would today be called quantitative genetics.

The Oomycete genus Petersenia is named to his honour.

== Selected scientific bibliography ==
- Petersen, H.E. (1903) Notes sur les Phycomycètes observés dans les téguments vides des nymphes de Phryganées avec description de trios espèces nouvelles de Chytridinées. Journal de Botanique 17 (6–7): 214–222.
- Petersen, H.E. (1905) Contributions à la connaissance des Phycomycètes marins (Chrytridinæ Fischer). Oversigt over det Kongelige Danske Videnskabernes Selskabs Forhandlinger 1905 (5): 439–488
- Petersen, H.E. (1908) Danske Arter af Slægten Ceramium (Roth) Lyngbye [with French summary]. Kongelige Danske Videnskabernes Selskabs Skrifter - Naturvidenskabelig og Mathematisk Afdeling, 7.Rk., vol. 5 (2).
- Petersen, H.E. (1908) The structure and biology of Arctic flowering plants (ed. E. Warming. 1. Ericinæ (Ericaceae, Pirolaceae). 2. The biological anatomy of them leaves and stems. Meddelelser om Grønland 36: 73–138.
- Petersen, H.E. (1908) The structure and biology of Arctic flowering plants (ed. E. Warming. 2. Diapensiaceae. Diapensia lapponica. Meddelelser om Grønland 36: 139–154.
- Petersen, H.E. (1910) An account of Danish freshwater Phycomycetes, with biological and systematical remarks. Annales Mycologici 8: 494–560.
- Ostenfeld, C.H. & Petersen, H.E. (1930) On a new Plasmodiophoracea found in Canada. Zeitschrift für Botanik 23: 13–18.
- Petersen, H. E. (1915) Indledende Studier over Polymorfien hos Anthriscus silvestris (L.) Hoffm. Dansk Botanisk Arkiv 1: 1–150.
- Petersen, H.E. (1924) Studier over Polymorphien hos Vaccinium uliginosum. Botanisk Tidsskrift 38 (3).
- Petersen, H.E. (1921) Nogle Studier over Pimpinella saxifraga L. Botanisk Tidsskrift 37: 222–240.
- Petersen, H.E. (1922) Études ultérieures sur la polymorphie de l'Anthriscus silvester (L.) Hoffm. Dansk Botanisk Arkiv 4: 1–28.
- Petersen, H.E. (1926) Über die Variation der Potentilla erecta (L.) Dalla Torre. Botanisk Tidsskrift 39: 368–374.
- Petersen, H.E. (1933) Wasting disease in eel grass (Zostera marina). Nature 134: 143–144.
- Petersen, H.E. (1935) Preliminary report on the disease of eel-grass (Zostera marina L.). Report from the Danish Biological Station 40: 3–8.
