= August Mentz =

August Mentz (5 December 1867 – 5 November 1944) was a Danish botanist, peat extraction and moor reclamation expert and a pioneer in nature conservation.

Mentz studied botany at the University of Copenhagen under professor Eugen Warming. He was employed by the Danish Moor Reclamation Society ("Det danske Hedeselskab") from 1899 to 1923. In 1912 he defended his doctoral thesis on the “Current Vegetation of Danish Bogs and Swamps” (Mentz 1912). From 1923 to 1938, he was professor of botany at Royal Veterinary and Agricultural University. He edited two voluminous colour plate floras – ”Billeder af Nordens Flora” and “Vilde Planter i Norden”.

Mentz was chairman of the state advisory board on conservation (”Naturfredningsrådet”) 1925–1944. However, with his background in moor reclamation, he had a foot in both camps – utilitarianism and conservationism.

== Selected publications ==
- Mentz, A. (1892) A fossil clay coast vegetation from Store Vildmose. Botanisk Tidsskrift 18 (2). (in Danish).
- Mentz, A. (1909) The structure and biology of Arctic flowering plants (ed. E. Warming. Empetraceae. Empetrum nigrum. Meddelelser om Grønland 36: 155–167.
- Mentz, A. (1909) Naturfredning - særlig i Danmark. Udvalget for Naturfredning og Gyldendalske Boghandel Nordisk Forlag, København. 63 pp (in Danish).
- Mentz, A. (1912) Studier over danske Mosers recente Vegetation. Gyldendalske Boghandel, København, 287 pp. Doctoral thesis (in Danish).
- Mentz, A. & Ostenfeld, C.H. (1901–1907) Billeder af Nordens Flora. København : G.E.C. Gads Forlag. Vol. 1–4, With 633 plates (in Danish).
- Mentz, A. (1928) Naturen og Forskeren. Kritisk Revy 3: 27-32 (in Danish).
- Jessen, Knud & A. Mentz (1937–1940): Vilde Planter i Norden. G.E.C. Gad, København (in Danish).
- Gram, K., Jensen, Hj. & Mentz, A. (1937) Nytteplanter. Gyldendal, København. 504 pp. (in Danish).
