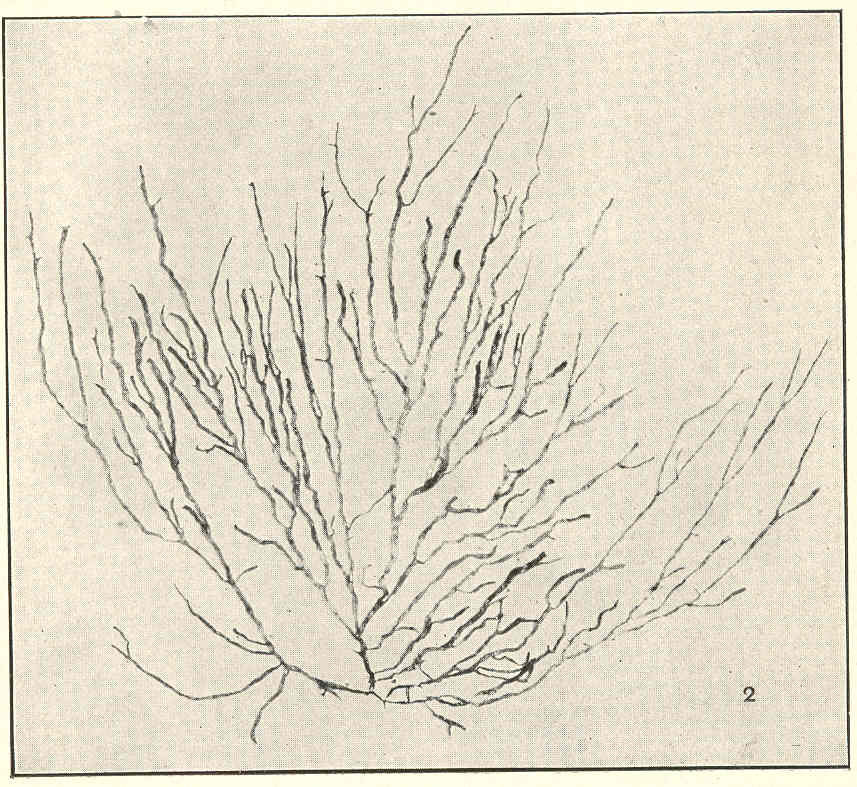
- Rosenvingea orientalis

Scientific classification
- Domain: Eukaryota
- Clade: Sar
- Clade: Stramenopiles
- Division: Ochrophyta
- Class: Phaeophyceae
- Order: Ectocarpales
- Family: Scytosiphonaceae
- Genus: Rosenvingea; Børgesen

= Rosenvingea =

Brown algae

Rosenvingea is a genus of brown algae first described by Frederik Børgesen in 1914.

The lectotype species is Rosenvingea sanctae-crucis Børgesen and named for the Danish phycologist Lauritz Kolderup Rosenvinge (1858–1939).

== Species ==
Currently there are 10 listed species name in AlgaeBase, on which 2 were considered as infraspecific names (Rosenvingea intricata (J.Agardh) Børgesen and Rosenvingea stellata Børgesen).

- Rosenvingea antillarum (P.Crouan & H.Crouan) M.J.Wynne
- Rosenvingea australis Huisman, G.H.Boo & S.M.Boo
- Rosenvingea endiviifolia (Martius) M.J.Wynne
- Rosenvingea fastigiata (Zanardini) Børgesen
- Rosenvingea floridana (W.R.Taylor) W.R.Taylor
- Rosenvingea hatrangensis E.Y.Dawson
- Rosenvingea orientalis (J.Agardh) Børgesen
- Rosenvingea sanctae-crucis Børgesen
- Rosenvingea intricata (J.Agardh) Børgesen
- Rosenvingea stellata Børgesen

== Morphology ==
The genus Rosenvingea by Børgesen (1914) for branched, brown algae with hollow centers and an outer cellular component composed of large hyaline cells bearing a layer of small, pigmented cells, and plurangia borne in surface sori. (Huisman) It is furtherly distinguished by its erect thalli with alternate or dichotomous branches, an apical to subapical meristem, a single plastid and prominent pyrenoid in vegetative cells, and phaeophycean hairs.

The branching pattern, which may be free in most species or co-adhering in some, are primarily used as taxonomic criteria for segregating the different taxa in this genus.

== Distribution ==
The genus Rosenvingea Børgesen is a tropical to subtropical genus of Scytosiphonacean brown algae. Recorded occurrences include Florida, Bermuda, North Carolina, the Caribbean, Gulf of Mexico, Brazil, Mediterranean, Eastern tropical Atlantic, Red Sea, Indo-Pacific and Australia.

Its heteromorphic life history coupled with its great tolerance to environmental conditions manages this genus to survive transport by different vectors.

== Ecology ==
Species of Rosenvingea exhibited different ecology pattern, Rosenvingea orientalis was recorded in the summer months in Australia, growing on rock associated with sand. Other species of Rosenvingea were found growing associated with other algae on rock in the shallow subtidal.

== Life history ==
Like other genera of Scytosiphonaceae, Rosenvingea have heteromorphic life history that switch between phases. It was observed to be influenced by environmental factors like temperature and length of day.

== Exploitation/harvesting/cultivation ==
No members of the Scytosiphonaceae have been identified internationally as ecologically or economically significant invasive species.

== Chemical composition/natural products chemistry ==
Steroid, glycosides, alkaloids, and tannins were detected from the species of Rosenvingea collected in Bay of Bengal, Bangladesh. Results of the ethanolic extract exhibited low antioxidant activity when compared with standard ascorbic acid and less toxic property when compared to K_{2}Cr_{2}O_{7}. The antibacterial activity was also tested for Klebsiella pneumoniae, Pseudomonas aeruginosa and Staphylococcus hominis.

== Utilization and management ==
No species have been identified internationally as ecologically or economically significant invasive species.
