= Frits Heide =

Danish botanist and science writer

Frits Ferdinand Rudolf Heide (7 December 1883 – 1957) was a Danish botanist and science writer. He studied botany at the University of Copenhagen from 1906 under professor Eugenius Warming, but never actually graduated. In 1909, Frits Heide revised J.P. Jacobsen’s translation of Charles Darwin's On the Origin of Species and The Descent of Man. He also translated Darwin's autobiography into Danish. Much later, in 1935, he finally published his own translation of the Origin of Species. Heide was a prolific writer in Danish popular science, but also contributed with more purely scientific texts on plant biology, forest history, ethnobotany etc. He also served as a private teacher. From around 1920, he was as a consultant for the Dutch government in Java, still publishing botanic works in Danish, Dutch and English on the side. He also founded and edited the journal Journal de Botanique Historique 1918-21.

== Selected scientific works ==
- Heide, F. (1909) The Structure and Biology of Arctic Flowering Plants 7. Lentibulariaceae, 441-481.
- Heide, F. (1923) Biologische onderzoekingen bij landbouwgewassen. I. Biologische waarnemingen bij Arachis hypogaea L. II Bloembestuiving in West Java. III. Bewaring en verzending van zaden en vegetatieve vermeerderingsorganen van tropische gewassen. Meded. Alg. Proefstation v. d. Landbouw. Batavia 14.
- Heide, F. (1923) Bloembiologische onderzoekingen betreffende sawahrijst. Meded. Alg. Proefstation v. d. Landbouw. Batavia 15.
- Heide, F. (1927) On the waxglands of Ficus glaberrima Bl. and their significance for Loriculus pumilus G.R.Gray. Ann. Jard. Bot. Buitenzorg 38: 115-120.
- Heide, F. (1927) Observation on the pollination of some flowers in the Dutch East Indies. Dansk Botanisk Arkiv 5 (3): 1-42.

== Selected archival studies on forest history ==
- Heide, F. (1915) Skovene omkring Ringsted i ældre Tider. Tidsskrift for Skovvæsen 27B: 99-118.
- Heide, F. (ed., 1917) Trojel HJ, Et Bidrag til Fyns Flora i det 18. Århundrede. Aarbog for Historisk Samfund for Odense og Assens Amter 4. årgang: 592-606.
- Heide, F. (1919) Ærø Skoves Historie. Tidsskrift for Historisk Botanik 1: 73-88.
- Heide, F. (1919) Midtsjælland i de gode, gamle Dage. 244 p.
- Heide, F. (1919) Historisk-botaniske Indsamlinger paa Refsnæs. Tidsskrift for Historisk Botanik 1: 244-249.
- Heide, F. (1919) Sejerø Skoves Historie. Dansk Skovforenings Tidsskrift 10: 429-453.
- Heide, F. (1919) Ringsted Klosters Godsarkiv. Fortid og Nutid 2: 156-163
- Heide, F. (1917) Registratur over Svenstrup Godsarkiv (Københavns og Sorø Amter). København.

== Sources ==
- Christensen, Carl (1913) Den danske botaniske Litteratur 1880-1911. København, H. Hagerups Forlag.
- Jstor Plant Science
- Darwin Archive
