= Leucopogon amplectens =

Conservation status
- Priority Two — Poorly Known Taxa (DEC)

Scientific classification
- Kingdom: Plantae
- Clade: Tracheophytes
- Clade: Angiosperms
- Clade: Eudicots
- Clade: Asterids
- Order: Ericales
- Family: Ericaceae
- Genus: Leucopogon
- Species: L. amplectens

Binomial name
- Leucopogon amplectens Ostenf.
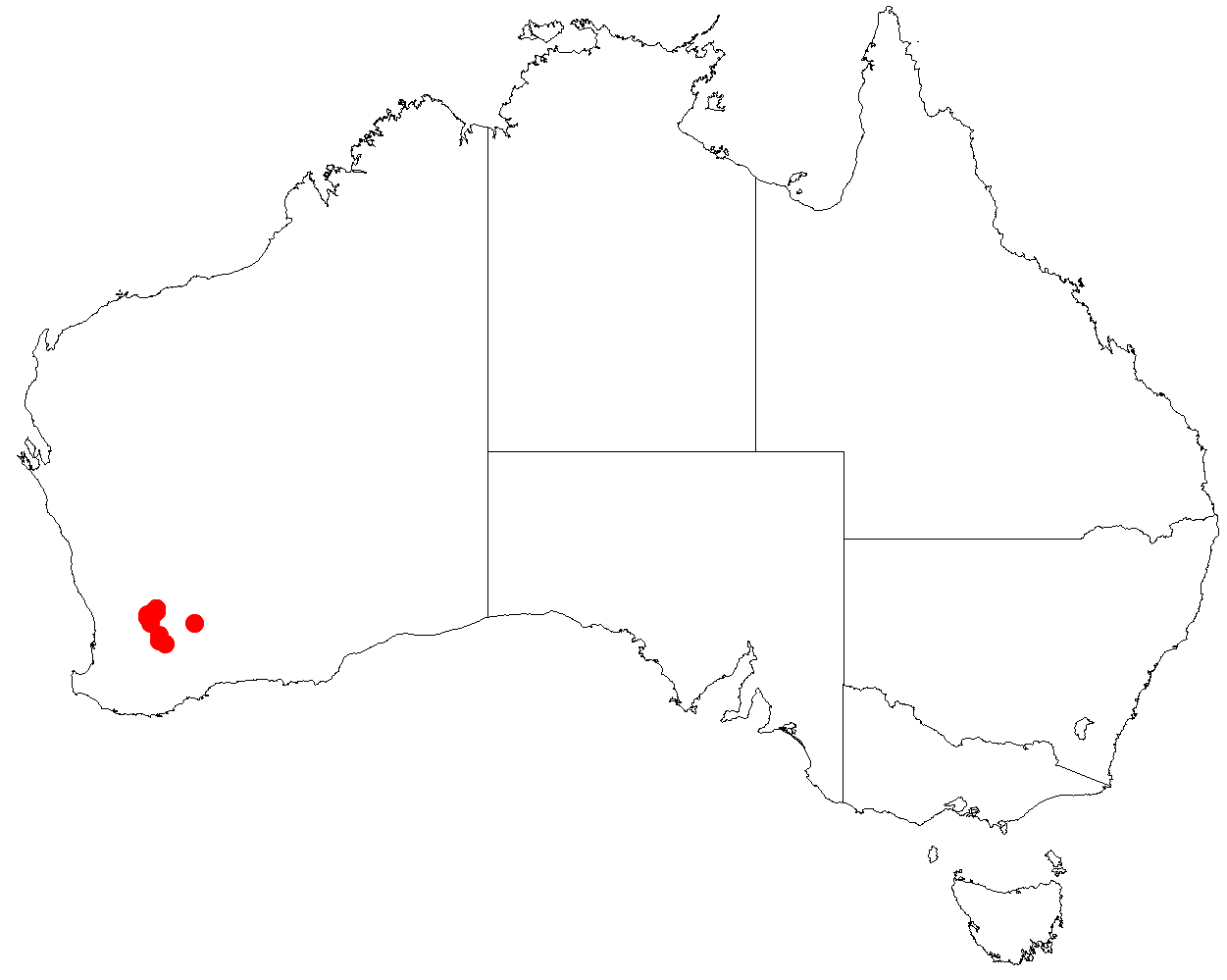
- Occurrence data from AVH

Species of shrub

Leucopogon amplectens is a species of flowering plant in the family Ericaceae and is endemic to the south-west of Western Australia. It is an erect shrub that typically grows to a height of 30–75 cm (12–30 in) and has tube-shaped, white flowers from April to June.

It was first formally described in 1921 by Carl Hansen Ostenfeld in the journal Biologiske meddelelser, Kongelige Danske Videnskabernes Selskab from specimens collected near Tammin. The specific epithet (amplectens) means "embracing", referring to the leaves.

Leucopogon amplectens grows in sandy soils in the Avon Wheatbelt and Mallee bioregions of south-western Western Australia and is listed as "Priority Two" by the Western Australian Government Department of Biodiversity, Conservation and Attractions, meaning that it is poorly known and from only one or a few locations.
