= Eugenius Warming =

Danish botanist and ecologist (1841–1924)

Eugen Warming
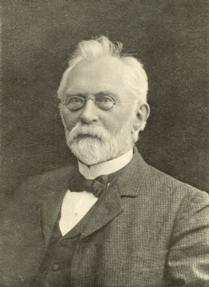
- Born: 3 November 1841; Mandø, Denmark
- Died: 2 April 1924 (aged 82); Copenhagen, Denmark
- Known for: founding ecology plant life forms tropical botany
- Awards: Commander 1st Degree of the Order of the Dannebrog; Commander of the Royal Victorian Order; Imperial Order of the Rose; Erzherzog Rainer-Medaille, Kaiserlich-königlichen zoologisch-botanischen Gesellschaft in Wien (1911); Great Linnean Medal in Gold
- Scientific career
- Fields: Ecology
- Workplaces: University of Copenhagen
- Doctoral students: Christen C. Raunkiær; Wilhelm Johannsen; Frederik Børgesen; Morten Porsild; Johannes Schmidt; Olaf Hagerup; Henning Eiler Petersen; Carl Hansen Ostenfeld; Ove Paulsen
- Author abbrev. (botany): Warm.

Signature
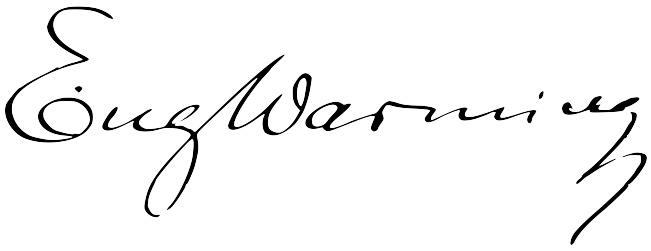

Johannes Eugenius Bülow Warming (3 November 1841 – 2 April 1924), known as Eugen Warming, was a Danish botanist and a pioneering figure in the development of ecology. In 1895 Warming published Plantesamfund, often regarded as the first textbook (1895) on plant ecology, and he taught an early university course in ecology. Ecologist Robert J. Goodland wrote in 1975: "If one individual can be singled out to be honoured as the founder of ecology, Warming should gain precedence."

Warming wrote textbooks on botany, plant geography and ecology, which were widely read and translated into several languages. Notable works include Plantesamfund and Haandbog i den systematiske Botanik.

== Early life and family life ==
Warming was born on the small Wadden Sea island of Mandø as the only child of Jens Warming (1797–1844), a parish minister, and Anna Marie von Bülow af Plüskow (1801–1863). After the early death of his father, he moved with his mother to her brother in Vejle in eastern Jutland.

He married Johanne Margrethe Jespersen (known as Hanne Warming; 1850–1922) on 10 November 1871. They had eight children: Marie (1872–1947) married C. V. Prytz, Jens Warming (1873–1939), who became a professor in economy and statistics at the Royal Veterinary and Agricultural University, Fro (1875–1880), Povl (1877–1878), Svend Warming (1879–1982), engineer at Burmeister & Wain shipyard, Inge (1879–1893), Johannes (1882–1970), farmer, and Louise (1884–1964). External link: Ancestors and descendents

== Education and career ==
He attended high school at Ribe Katedralskole and commenced 1859 studies of natural history at the University of Copenhagen, but left university for three and a half years (1863–1866) to act as secretary for the Danish palaeontologist Peter Wilhelm Lund, who lived and worked in Lagoa Santa, Brazil. After his return to Europe, he studied for a year under K.F.P. Martius, Carl Nägeli and Ludwig Radlkofer in Munich and, in 1871, under J.L. von Hanstein in Bonn. Later in the same year (1871), he defended his Doctor of Philosophy thesis at Copenhagen.

The professorship in botany at the University of Copenhagen became vacant with the death of A.S. Ørsted and Warming was a candidate for the succession. However, he was passed over and the chair given to the older, but much less productive and original Ferdinand Didrichsen. Warming then became docent of botany at the University of Copenhagen, the polytechnic (Polyteknisk Læreanstalt) and the Pharmaceutical College 1873–1882. He became professor in botany at Stockholms högskola (later Stockholm University) 1882–1885. As the eldest professor, he was elected rector magnificus. In 1885, he became professor in botany at the University of Copenhagen and director of the Copenhagen Botanical Garden and held these positions until his retirement on 31 December 1910. He was rector magnificus of the University of Copenhagen 1907–1908.

He was a member of the Royal Danish Academy of Sciences and Letters from 1878 to his death. As such, he served on the board of directors of the Carlsberg Foundation 1889-1921 and, because a biologist, on the board of the Carlsberg Laboratory. He also served on the board of the Geological Survey of Denmark 1895–1917.

Eugen Warming was a frequent visitor to foreign universities, e.g. a travel to Strasbourg and Paris in 1876 and another to Göttingen, Jena, Bonn, Strasbourg and Paris in 1880. He participated in several Scandinavian Scientist Conferences between 1868 and 1916 and in the similar German meeting in Breslau in 1874. He joined the International Botanical Congresses in Amsterdam 1877, in Vienna 1905 and in Brussels 1910 and was president of the ‘Association internationale des botanistes‘ (1913). He attended the Linnaeus celebration in Uppsala 1907 and the Darwin celebration in London 1908. He was honorary fellow of the Royal Society in London, was elected member of the Royal Swedish Academy of Sciences in 1885 and honorary member of the Danish Botanical Society. He was a corresponding member of the botanical section of the French Academy of Sciences. He was made Commander 1st Degree of the Order of the Dannebrog, Commander of the Royal Victorian Order and the Brazilian Imperial Order of the Rose. He is buried in Assistants Cemetery in Copenhagen.

== Expeditions ==
- 1863-1866: Brazil, Lagoa Santa
- 1884 Greenland (Fylla expedition - view images on arktiskebilleder.dk
- 1885: Norway, Finnmark
- 1887: Norway, Dovre
- 1891-1892: Venezuela, Trinidad and the Danish West Indies
- 1895: Faroe Islands

In addition, shorter visits to the Alps and other proximate destinations.

== Plantesamfund ('Oecology of plants') ==
The book Plantesamfund was based on Warming's lectures on plant geography at the University of Copenhagen. It gives an introduction to all major biomes of the world. Warming's aim, and his major lasting impact on the development of ecology, was to explain how nature solved similar problems (drought, flooding, cold, salt, herbivory, etc.) in similar way, despite using very different ‘raw material’ (species of different origin) in different regions of the world. This was an approach emphasizing functional explanations of plant communities, differing from prevalent floristic descriptions.

- Warming, E. (1895) Plantesamfund - Grundtræk af den økologiske Plantegeografi. P.G. Philipsens Forlag, Kjøbenhavn. 335 pp.

The subtitle alludes to the title of the book Grundtræk af den almindelige Plantegeografi, published in 1822 (German edn 1823: Grundzüge einer allgemeinen Pflanzengeographie) by J. F. Schouw, co-founder of the scientific phytogeography.

Plantesamfund was translated to German in 1896 as

- Lehrbuch der ökologischen Pflanzengeographie—Eine Einführung in die Kenntnis der Pflanzenvereine by Emil Knoblauch. Berlin, Gebrüder Borntraeger, 1896. 412 pp. This edition, which was approved by Warming, went out of print.

A second, unauthorized, edition was issued during 1902 by Paul Graebner, who put his own name after Warming's on the book's frontispiece, despite no changes to the contents.

- Lehrbuch der ökologischen Pflanzengeographie - Eine Einführung in die Kenntnis der Pflanzenvereine]; "Nach der neuesten Litteratur Vervollständigt bei Paul Graebner"; Berlin, Gebrüder Borntraeger.

This edition was expanded in third and fourth editions:

- Warming, E. & Graebner, P. (1918) Eug. Warming's Lehrbuch der ökologischen Pflanzengeographie, 3 ed. Berlin, Gebrüder Borntrager. Fourth edn (1933) - 1158 pp.

A Polish translation of ’Plantesamfund’ (from Knoblauch's German translation) appeared in 1900:

- Warming, E. (1900) Zbiorowiska Roślinne zarys ekologicznej geografii roślin by Edward Strumpf and Jósef Trzebiński. Warszawa, 1900. 451 pp.

Two independent Russian (Moscow and St. Petersburg) editions appeared in 1901 and 1903

- Вармингъ, Е. (1901) Ойкологическая географія растеній – Введеніе въ изученіе растительныхъ сообществъ by M. Golenkin and W. Arnol'di. Moskva, 542 pp.
- Вармингъ, Е. (1903) Распредъленіе растений въ зависимости отъ внъшнихъ условій—Экологическая географія растеній by A. G. Henkel' and with a treatise of the vegetation of Russia by G. I. Tanfil'ev. St. Petersburg, 474 pp.

An extended and translated edition in English first appeared in 1909:

- Warming, E. with M. Vahl (1909) Oecology of Plants—an introduction to the study of plant-communities by P. Groom and I. B. Balfour. Clarendon Press, Oxford. 422 pp. (2nd edn 1925).

The German ecologist A. F. W. Schimper published Pflanzengeographie auf physiologisher Grundlage in 1898.

This work not only covered much of the same ground as Warming did in 1895 and 1896 but in fact also leaned heavily on Warming’s research. Schimper (1898) quoted extensively from more than 15 of Warming’s works and even reproduced Warming’s figures. Yet nowhere did Schimper acknowledge his profound debt to Warming, neither in the list of picture credits, nor in the acknowledgements section of the Vorwort, nor in his list of major sources, and not even in a footnote! ... Although replete with Warming’s data, it contains few ideas and did not advance ecology beyond what Warming had done earlier.

== Warming as a teacher ==
Warming authored university and school botany textbooks used in Denmark and abroad.

=== Handbook of systematic botany ===
Warming's textbook on systematics for his lectures of botany in Copenhagen appeared in several editions and was translated to German, Russian and English and used in foreign universities.

- Warming, E. (1878) Haandbog i den systematiske Botanik (nærmest til Brug for Universitets-Studerende og Lærere). København. (2nd edn 1884; 3rd ed with Algae by N. Wille and fungi by E. Rostrup 1891).

German edn. 1890: Handbuch der systematischen Botanik by E. Knoblauch (2nd edn 1902, 3rd edn 1911, 4th edn 1929 all by M. Möbius). Russian edn 1893: Систематика растеній (from the 3rd Danish edn by S. Rostovzev and M. Golenkin; 2nd edn 1898). English edn 1895: A handbook of systematic botany (by M.C. Potter; several editions, latest 1932). The section on seed plants was later expanded and issued as

- Warming Eug. (1912) Frøplanterne (Spermatofyter) [translated title: Seed Plants]. Kjøbenhavn, Gyldendalske Boghandel/Nordisk Forlag. 467 pp. (2nd edn 1933).

The sections on spore plants were updated and published separately as

- Rosenvinge L. Kolderup (1913) Sporeplanterne (Kryptogamerne). Kjöbenhavn, Gyldendalske Boghandel/Nordisk Forlag. 388 pp.

=== Handbook of general botany ===
Warming's textbook on plant morphology, anatomy and physiology was translated to Swedish and German: Warming Eug. Den almindelige Botanik: En Lærebog, nærmest til Brug for Studerende og Lærere [translated title: General Botany]. Kjøbenhavn, 1880. (2nd edn 1886; 3rd edn by Warming and Wilhelm Johannsen 1895; 4th edn by Warming and Johannsen 1900–01). Swedish edn 1882: Lärobok i allmän botanik (by Axel N. Lundström). German edn 1907-09: Lehrbuch der allgemeinen Botanik (from the 4th edn, by E. P. Meinecke). Berlin, Borntraeger. 667 pp.

Also, Warming's schoolbook on botany was used abroad: Warming Eug. (1900) Plantelivet: Lærebog i Botanik for Skoler og Seminarier [translated title: 'Plant Life']. København. (2nd edn 1902; 3rd edn 1905; 4th and 5th edns by C. Raunkiær and Warming 1908 and 1914, respectively; 6th edn (1920) by E. Warming and Johs. Boye Petersen). English edn 1911: Plant Life - A Text-book of Botany for Schools and Colleges (from the 4th edn by M.M. Rehling and E.M. Thomas). London. Russian edn 1904: Растение и его жизнь (Началный учебник ботаники). (from the 2nd edn by L.M. Krečotovič and M. Golenkin). Moskva. Dutch edns 1905, 1912 and 1919 Kern der plantkunde (by Dr. A.J.M. Garjeanne).

=== Excursions ===
Warming felt a strong need to take students of botany out of the lecture theatre. He used the botanic garden to demonstrate live plants, but to teach plant ecology he needed students to get out in nature. The action radius from Copenhagen offered by trips by foot was far too small, however. He applied to the government and obtained a grant to take students on longer excursions every year from 1893; every third year these went to western Jutland, once to Bornholm, otherwise to Zealand. His excursion notes were published and are instructive introductions to the environment and plant adaptation in dunes, salt marshes and other habitats:

- Warming, E. (1890) Botaniske Exkursioner 1. Fra Vesterhavskystens Marskegne. Videnskabelige Meddelelser fra den Naturhistoriske Forening i Kjøbenhavn 1890.
- Warming, E. (1891) Botaniske Exkursioner 2. De psammophile Formationer i Danmark. Videnskabelige Meddelelser fra den Naturhistoriske Forening i Kjøbenhavn 1891: 153–202.
- Warming, E. (1891) Botaniske Exkursioner 3. Skarridsø. Videnskabelige Meddelelser fra den Naturhistoriske Forening i Kjøbenhavn 1891.

== Further scientific works of E. Warming ==
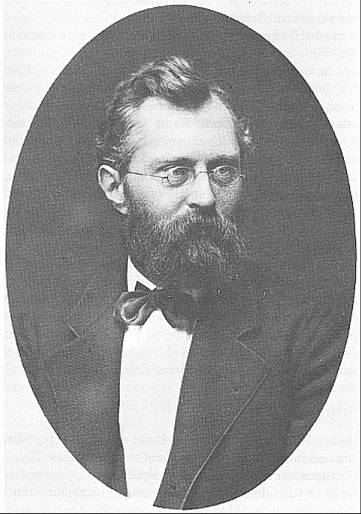
Eugen Warming 1879

=== Plant systematics ===
His early experience with vegetation in a tropical region later informed his research focus. His collections from Lagoa Santa, 2600 plant species, of which some 370 turned out to be new to science, were treated in a monumental 40-volume and 1400-page work, Symbolæ ad Floram Brasiliæ centralis cognoscendam. For this work, Warming farmed out plant families to more than fifty plant taxonomists, mainly in Europe.

- Symbolæ ad Floram Brasiliæ centralis cognoscendam, particulæ 1–10, 1873
- Symbolæ 11–20, 1875
- Symbolæ 21–30, 1886
- Symbolæ 31–40, 1893
- Symbolæ 31–40, 1893. E.g. Particula XXXIX, Enumeratio Myrtacearum Brasiliensium by Hjalmar Kiærskou.

They were all published as volumes in the series ’Videnskabelige Meddelelser fra den Naturhistoriske Forening i Kjøbenhavn’. In addition, Warming treated the families Vochysiaceae and Trigoniaceae for the Flora Brasiliensis:

- Vochysiaceae et Trigoniaceae. Flora Brasiliensis, Eichler, A.G. ed.: Vol. XIII, Part II, Fasc. 67, Column 16–116. Monachii, 1875.

=== His favourite plant family: Études sur la famille des Podostemacées ===
Warming held a special interest in the family Podostemaceae, with which he had become acquainted during his stay in Brazil. The plant species of this family are extremely modified by the harsh environment in which they live - they are angiosperms that resemble liverworts.

- Warming, E. (1881–1899) Familien Podostemaceae - Études sur la famille des Podostemacées.

Part I-V. All published in Kongelige Danske Videnskabernes Selskabs Skrifter - Naturvidenskabelig og Mathematisk Afdeling, 6. Rk.

=== Lagoa Santa ===
Having finished the taxonomical work, Warming finally published his ecological study of plant communities in the Lagoa Santa area, with cerrado as the main vegetation type.

- Warming, E. (1892) Lagoa Santa: Et Bidrag til den biologiske Plantegeografi med en Fortegnelse over Lagoa Santas Hvirveldyr. Kongelige Danske Videnskabernes Selskabs Skrifter - Naturvidenskabelig og Mathematisk Afdeling, 6. Rk. vol. 6 (3): 153-488.

Warming issued a lengthy summary in French (1893): Lagoa Santa – Étude de Géographie Botanique. Revue Générale de Botanique 5: 145-158, 209-233. Portuguese translation: Warming, Eugenio Lagoa Santa: Contribuição para a geographia phytobiologica, by Alberto Löfgren Belo Horizonte, 1908. This edition was augmented by the Brazilian ecologist M.G. Ferri with more recent research on the cerrado system and reissued as: Warming, E. & Ferri, M.G. (1973) Lagoa Santa – a vegetação de cerrados brasileiros. University of São Paulo.

=== Organogenetic studies ===
Early on in Warming's scientific career, the morphological-organogenetic point of was the leading principle in botanical research, and he soon became one of the most prominent workers in this branch of botany. His main works from the early period are his thesis on floral development in Euphorbia and on seed plant ovules.

Warming's doctoral thesis (in Danish) dealt with ontogeny of the cyathia of Euphorbia (Euphorbiaceae).

- Warming, J. Eug. B. 1871. Koppen hos Vortemælken en Blomst eller en Blomsterstand? En organogenetisk morfologisk Undersøgelse. French summary: Le cyathium de l"Euphorbia est-il une fleure ou une inflorescence? Kjøbenhavn, G.E.C. Gad.

Part of the work was published in German the year before the thesis:

- Warming, E. 1870. Über die Entwicklung des Blütenstandes von Euphorbia. Flora 53: 385–397.

His studies of pollen and anther formation i Angiosperms and on the inflorescence of Asteraceae were published in von Hanstein's Botanische Abhandlungen:

- Warming, E. (1873) Untersuchungen über pollenbildende Phyllome und Kaulome. Botanische Abhandlungen aus dem Gebiet der Morphologie und Physiologie, 2 (2): 1-90.
- Warming, E. (1876) Die Blüte der Kompositen. Botanische Abhandlungen aus dem Gebiete der Morphologie und Physiologie, 3 (2): 1–167.

His studies on seed plant ovules were published in French as

- Warming, E. 1878. De l’Ovule. Annales des Sciences Naturelles - Botanique et Biologie Vegetale sér. 6: 177–266.

Through the 1870s, Warming became much-influenced by Darwinism. The scope of his research changed. First towards understanding ontogenesis in the light of a common descent as seen in De l’Ovule, later towards plant adaptation to environmental conditions. Again, his observational work paired with his tropical experiencewas decisive to the route he chose.

=== Plant life-form ===
Although Warming did not coin the term life-form until 1895 (in Plantesamfund Ch. 2), he commenced work on plant life-form already during his Stockholm years. In the paper

- Warming, E. (1884) Om Skudbygning, Overvintring og Foryngelse [translated title: On shoot architecture, perennation and rejuvenation]. Naturhistorisk Forenings Festskrift: 1–105. Line drawings,

he presented a classification based on longevity of the plant, power of vegetative propagation, duration of tillers, hypogeous or epigeous type of shoots, mode of wintering, and degree and mode of branching of rhizomes. The observation were made while raising wild plants from seed under garden conditions. In the late 1880s, after Warming's return to Copenhagen, he swopped research topic with his student Christen Raunkiær, who had traveled along the North Sea coast from Jutland to the Netherlands and published on the phytogeography of coastal vegetation. Warming now worked on plant adaptations in dunes and salt marshes, while Raunkiær studied the morphology of Danish plants, eventually leading him to his plant life-form scheme. Nevertheless, after Raunkiær had published his life-form scheme, Warming return to this topic in the work

- Warming, E. (1908) Om planterigets livsformer [translated title: On the life forms in the vegetable kingdom]. G.E.C. Gad, København.

Warming's new scheme was less simple than Raunkiær's, taking other environmental factors than wintering into account, especially water/drought stress. Warming did not approve of what he saw as over-simplification in the Raunkiær scheme. Warmings last published work was a renewed attempt to put all plant (including bacteria and algae) life forms into a system.

- Warming, E. (1923) Økologiens Grundformer – Udkast til en systematisk Ordning [translated title: Fundamental ecological forms - draft for a system]. Kongelige Danske Videnskabernes Selskabs Skrifter - Naturvidenskabelig og Mathematisk Afdeling, 8. Rk., vol. 4: 120–187.

=== Greenland, Iceland and Faroe Islands ===
Warmings published a number of treatises based on his expedition to Southwest Greenland in 1884. One of the most important ones is his observations of the vegetation of Greenland and the history of the flora:

- Warming, E. (1887) Om Grønlands Vegetation [translated title: On the vegetation of Greenland]. Meddelelser om Grønland 12: 1–223. A summary was published as:
- Warming, E. (1888) Über Grönlands Vegetation. Englers Botanische Jahrbücher, 10. Following the publication of this paper, Warming entered a dispute with A.G. Nathorst over the history of the flora of Greenland.

Warming's collections of leaves, stems and flowers, made during the brief expedition, were examined in detail and the anatomy of a number of species described in a series of papers in Danish. Later, Warming distributed the material family-wise, now ameliorated with collectections made later expeditions and elsewhere in the Arctic, to students, who made further investigations and published the results in English: Warming, E. ed. (1908–1921) The structure and biology of Arctic flowering plants. Meddelelser om Grønland vol. 36: 1-481 and 37: 1–507.

- Warming, E. ed. (1901–1908) Botany of the Færöes - based upon Danish investigations', vol. I-III. Copenhagen and London.
- Rosenvinge, L. Kolderup & Warning, E. (eds) (1912–1932) The Botany of Iceland, vol. 1–3. Copenhagen, J. Frimodt. Continued in vols 4-5 edited by Johannes Grøntved, Ove Paulsen and Thorvald Sørensen. Full text of Vol. 1 (part 1 and part 2) and Vol. 2 (part 1).

=== Vegetation of Denmark ===
- Warming, E. 1904. Bidrag until Vadernes, Sandenes og Marskens Naturhistorie (with contributions of C. Wesenberg-Lund, E. Østrup &c). Kongelige Danske Videnskabernes Selskabs Skrifter - Naturvidenskabelig og Mathematisk Afdeling, 7. Rk., 2: 1-56.
- Warming, E. 1906. Dansk Plantevækst. 1. Strandvegetationen. - Gyldendalske Boghandel Nordisk Forlag. [beach vegetation]
- Warming, E. 1909. Dansk Plantevækst. 2. Klitterne. - Gyldendalske Boghandel Nordisk Forlag. [dunes]
- Warming, E. 1917. Dansk Plantevækst. 3. Skovene. - Gyldendalske Boghandel Nordisk Forlag. [forests]

== Warming’s influence ==
It was Eugenius Warming's Lehrbuch der ökologischen Pflanzengeographie that must be considered as the starting point of self-conscious ecology. This book was the first to use physiological relations between plants and their environment, and in addition biotic interactions to explain the moulding of the assemblages that plant geographers had described and classified, and it would set up a research agenda for decades to come.

Despite the language barrier, Warming's influence on the development of ecology is remarkable, not the least in Britain and the USA. The British ecologist Arthur Tansley was extremely influenced by reading ’Plantesamfund’ (or rather the 1896 German edition). Reading the book made him jump from anatomy to ecology. Tansley used the book as textbook in a university course as early as 1899. Similarly, Warming's book was decisive in forming the careers of North American naturalists like Henry Chandler Cowles. Cowles' now classic studies of Lake Michigan sand dune plant communities were directly inspired by Warming's studies of Danish dunes. Also Frederic Clements was much inspired by Warming when starting to working with succession, but more by Oscar Drude in formulating his concept of vegetational climax in his 1916 book.

A more unexpected avenue of influence went through the American sociologist Robert E. Park, who read Warming's Oecology of Plants and used the ideas of ecological succession as inspiration for a notion of succession in human communities – a human ecology.

Warming's influence on later Scandinavian ecology was immense. Especially significant was his inspiration to Christen Raunkiær – his pupil and successor on the chair of botany at the University of Copenhagen. In addition, he had a direct influence on Danish research, scientific and other, for a couple of decades. After his appointment to the professorship in Copenhagen, he gradually took over Japetus Steenstrups power base, most notably as one of three members of the board of the Carlsberg Foundation for 32 years. Thus, Warming had the upper hand in who should be granted money and who should not.

== Warming and evolution ==
Warming was a firm believer in adaptation. However, he was a declared Lamarckist. In his popularizing book Nedstamningslæren (The theory of descendence; 1915), he reviewed the direct and indirect evidence for common descent of living organisms and for Darwinian natural selection as a process involved in speciation. His keen observations of how differently the same plant is grown under different circumstances (now known as phenotypic plasticity) led him to question the change of species by infinitesimally small steps as advocated by his contemporary Darwinists of the Biometry school, e.g. Karl Pearson. Warming summarized his view on the ways in which new species could may arise:

1. By inheritance of acquired characters;
2. By hybridization;
3. By natural selection, with the latter mechanism being the least important.

== Warming, religion and politics ==
Warming was raised in a Christian Protestant home and he continued to be religious throughout his life. He accepted the evolution by descent of living beings, but believed that laws governing planets’ orbits and other laws governing organic evolution were God-given. In his popular book Nedstamningslæren (translated title: Evolution by descent), he concludes the section on hypotheses about the origin of life writing that, no matter what hypothesis is considered, it just “defers the grand question: how did life first come into existence, »in the beginning«? ... as if we human beings thereby obtained understanding and explanation for anything at all, or circumvented the almighty power that, incomprehensibly to our mind, must have created matter, force, time and infinite space. Science has not disproven the Bible that says: »In the beginning God created …«!”. Warming shared this view with many prominent contemporary naturalists, e.g. Alfred Russel Wallace.

Politically, Warming was national-conservative, Scandinavist and anti-Prussian. Warming was able to visit his birthplace only a few times in his life because Schleswig was conquered by Prussia and Austria in 1864 and (Northern Schleswig) returned to Denmark in 1920. Warming expressed support, in letters, for France in the 1870 Franco-Prussian War. He made financial contributions to a secret fund that should support Danish-minded Schleswigian farmers in buying farms and prevent Germanization of Northern Schleswig. In a letter of 1898 to his son Jens, he regrets that the Højre – the conservative party – would lose an upcoming election and expresses concern that anarchy and socialism will eventually rule.

== Miscellaneous ==
The Orchid genus Warmingia Rchb.f. and dozens of vascular plant species (IPN]) has been named to his honour. The same is the case for a number of fungi, e.g. the smut fungus Microbotryum warmingii (Rostr.) Vánky and the gall fungus Arcticomyces warmingii (Rostr.) Savile. Warming Land - a peninsula in northernmost Greenland is named for him.

Universidade Federal de Minas Gerais has organized a series of 'Eugen Warming lectures in Evolutionary Ecology' since 1994.

== See also ==
- History of ecology

== Biographies and obituaries ==
- Raunkiær, C. (1904) Biography in Dansk Biografisk Lexikon, vol. XVIII
- Urban, Ignatius (1906) Vitae for Warming in Flora Brasiliensis, enumeratio plantarum in Brasilia hactenus detectarum :quas suis aliorumque botanicorum studiis descriptas et methodo naturali digestas partim icone illustratas /ediderunt Carolus Fridericus Philippus de Martius et Augustus Guilielmus Eichler; iisque defunctis successor Ignatius Urban; Fasc. CXXX (ultimus) - VITAE ITINERAQUE COLLECTORUM BOTANICORUM Etc.
- Obituary in Nature, 113, 683-684 (1924) by William G. Smith
- Obituaries in Botanisk Tidsskrift, 39 (1924):
  - L. K. Rosenvinge: Eug. Warming og Dansk Botanisk Forening, pp. 1–6
  - Carl Christensen: Eug. Warming, en Levnedsbeskrivelse, pp. 7–30
  - C. H. Ostenfeld: Warmings almindelige botaniske Virksomhed, pp. 31–38
  - A. Mentz: Warming som plantegeografisk Forsker, pp. 39–44
  - Charles Flahault, O. Juel, C. Schröter and A.G. Tansley: Eug. Warming in memoriam, pp. 45–56.
- Christensen, C. (1924–26) Den danske botaniks historie, med tilhørende bibliografi. I. Den danske botaniks historie fra de ældste tider til 1912. II. Bibliografi.
- Christensen, C. (1932) Eugenius Warming, pp. 156–160 in: Meisen, V. Prominent Danish Scientists through the Ages. University Library of Copenhagen 450th Anniversary. Levin & Munksgaard, Copenhagen.
- Müller, D. (1980) Warming, Johannes Eugenius Bülow. In: Gillespie, C.G. (ed.) Dictionary of Scientific Biography, vol. 16. New York, NY: Charles Scribner and Sons. ISBN 0-684-10114-9
- Klein, Aldo Luiz (2000) Warming e o cerrado brasileiro um século depois. São Paulo, UNESP. 156 pp. ISBN 85-7139-354-0

== Bibliography ==
- Warming, Eugenius (1884) [1878]. Haandbog i den systematiske botanik: naermest til brug for laerere og Universitets-Studerende (in Danish) (2nd ed.). Copenhagen: Philipsen.
- Warming, Eugenius (1890) [1884]. Handbuch der systematischen Botanik [Haandbog i den systematiske botanik] (in German). translated from 2nd. Danish edition by Emil Knoblauch. Berlin: Borntraeger.
- Warming, Eugenius (1912). Frøplanterne (Spermatofyter) (in Danish). Kjøbenhavn: Gyldendalske Boghandel Nordisk Forlag.
