= International Phytogeographic Excursion =

The International Phytogeographic Excursions was a series of international meetings in plant geography that significantly contributed to exchange of scientific ideas across national and linguistic barriers and also to the rise of Anglo-American plant ecology. The initiative was taken by the British botanist Arthur Tansley at the International Geographic Congress in Geneva in 1908. Tansley and another early key figure, Henry C. Cowles, were both much-inspired by the new 'ecological plant geography' introduced by Eugenius Warming and its quest for answering why-questions about plant distribution, as opposed to the traditional, merely descriptive 'floristic plant geography'.

The First International Phytogeographic Excursion was held in the British Isles in 1911. It was organized by Arthur Tansley and went through parts of England, Scotland and Ireland. The participants were:

- Eduard Rübel, Switzerland
- Carl Schroeter, Switzerland
- Oscar Drude, Germany
- Paul Graebner, Germany
- C.A.M. Lindman, Sweden
- G. Claridge Druce, England
- Jean Massart, Belgium
- C.H. Ostenfeld, Denmark
- Frederic Clements, U.S.A.
- Henry C. Cowles, U.S.A., who gave a brief report in Science in 1913.

The Second International Phytogeographic Excursion was a travel across North America from July to September 1913. It was hosted by a number of American ecologists led by Henry C. Cowles. The participants were:

- Henry C. Cowles, U.S.A.
- Frederic Clements, U.S.A.
- Edith S. Clements, U.S.A.
- Alfred Dachnowsky, U.S.A.
- George Fuller, U.S.A.
- George E. Nichols, U.S.A.
- Willis Linn Jepson, U.S.A.
- Heinrich Brockmann-Jerosch, Switzerland
- Marie Charlotte Brockmann-Jerosch, Switzerland
- Ove Paulsen, Denmark
- Carl Skottsberg, Sweden
- Eduard Rübel, Switzerland
- Karl von Tubeuf, Germany
- Carl Schroeter, Switzerland
- Theodoor J. Stomps, Netherlands
- Arthur Tansley, England
- Adolf Engler, Germany
- Cecil Crampton, Scotland.

The Third International Phytogeographic Excursion was proposed in 1915, but postponed due to the First World War. It was finally carried through in 1923 in neutral Switzerland, and as noted by John William Harshberger is his report in Ecology, the participants from Germany, France and other nations recently at war, coexisted peacefully. The organizers were the Swiss botanists Rübel, Schroeter and H. Brockmann-Jerosch. The participants were, among others:

- Gustaf Einar Du Rietz, Sweden
- John William Harshberger, U.S.A.
- Jens Holmboe, Norway
- Huguet del Villar, Spain
- Kaarlo Linkola, Finland
- Hugo Osvald, Sweden
- Ove Paulsen, Denmark
- Robert Lloyd Praeger, Ireland
- Constantin von Regel, Lithuania
- Edward Salisbury, England
- Carl Skottsberg, Sweden
- Władysław Szafer, Poland
- Heinrich Brockmann-Jerosch, Switzerland
- Marie Charlotte Brockmann-Jerosch, Switzerland
- Eduard Rübel, Switzerland
- Carl Schroeter, Switzerland
- Josias Braun-Blanquet, Switzerland
- Paul Jaccard, Switzerland

The Fourth International Phytogeographic Excursion was held in Scandinavia in 1925 (July 2 to August 24). It formed as a trip through Sweden and Norway starting in Lund in southernmost Sweden, passing Stockholm, Uppsala and Abisko, going down through Norway, ending in Oslo. It was organized by G. Einar Du Rietz from Uppsala University.

By this time, Warmings 'ecological plant geography' had developed into plant ecology and the excursion programme returned to 'floristic plant geography'. Through the 1930s and after the Second World War, the International Phytogeographic Excursions continued at regular intervals, but now outside the mainstream of ecology. At the same time, scientific exchange between plant ecologists had found other means.

The Fifth International Phytogeographic Excursion was held in Czechoslovakia in 1928. It was organized by Karel Domin.

The Sixth International Phytogeographic Excursion was held in Romania in 1931.

The Seventh International Phytogeographic Excursion was held in Italy in 1934.

The Eighth International Phytogeographic Excursion went to Morocco and western Algeria in 1936.

- 1949 Ireland (9th excursion)
- 1953 Spain (10th excursion)
- 1956 Eastern Alps (11th excursion)
- 1958 Czechoslovakia (12th excursion)
- 1961 Finland and North Norway
- 1966 French Alps, Switzerland, Eastern Pyrenees
- 1970 Western Alps (14th excursion)
- 1971 mainland Greece and Crete (15th excursion)
- 1978 U.S.A. (16th excursion)
- 1983 Argentina (17th excursion)
- 1984 Japan
- 1989 Poland (19th excursion)
