= The Structure and Biology of Arctic Flowering Plants =

20th-century scientific work on plants

The Structure and Biology of Arctic Flowering Plants is a classical scientific work on morphology and anatomy in relation to the harsh arctic environment. It was initiated by Eugenius Warming and conducted by himself and a suite of students and colleagues at the University of Copenhagen.

Warming, E. ed. (1908–1921) The structure and biology of Arctic flowering plants.

- Meddelelser om Grønland, 36,
  - Warming, E. (1908) 1. Ericinæ (Ericaceae, Pirolaceae). 1. Morphology and biology, p. 1–71.
  - Petersen, H.E. (1908) 1. Ericinæ (Ericaceae, Pirolaceae). 2. The biological anatomy of them leaves and stems, p. 73–138.
  - Petersen, H.E. (1908) 2. Diapensiaceae. Diapensia lapponica, p. 139–154.
  - Mentz, A. (1909) 3. Empetraceae. Empetrum nigrum, p. 155–167.
  - Warming, E. (1909) 4. Saxifragaceae. 1. Morphology and biology, p. 169–236.
  - Galløe, O. (1909) 4. Saxifragaceae. 2. The biological leaf-anatomy of the Arctic species of Saxifraga, p. 237–294.
  - Seidelin, A. (1909) 5. Hippuridaceae, Halorrhagidaceae and Callitrichaceae, p. 295–332.
  - Jessen, K. (1909) 6. Ranunculaceae, p. 334–440.
  - Heide, F. (1909) 7. Lentibulariaceae, 441–481.
- Meddelelser om Grønland, 37,
  - Jessen, K. (1913) 8. Rosaceæ, p. 1–126.
  - Olsen, C. (1914) 9. Cornaceae, p. 127–150.
  - Hagerup, O. (1915) 10. Caprifoliaceae. Linnaea borealis L., p. 151–164.
  - Mathiesen, F.J. (1916) 11. Primulaceae, p. 165–220.
  - Warming, E. (1920) 13. Caryophyllaceæ, p. 229–342.
  - Porsild, M.P. (1920) 14. Liliales, p. 343–358.
  - Mathiesen, F.J. (1921) 15. Scrophulariaceae, 359–507.
