= Johannes Boye Petersen =

Danish botanist and phycologist (1887–1961)

Johannes Boye Petersen (29 September 1887 – 22 March 1961) was a Danish botanist and phycologist, mainly working on diatoms.

== Selected scientific works ==
- Studies on the Biology and Taxonomy of Soil Algae. Dansk Botanisk Arkiv vol. 8 (9): 1–183. 1935.
- The fresh-water Cyanophyceæ of Iceland. The Botany of Iceland, edited by L. Kolderup Rosenvinge & E. Warming, J. Frimodt, Copenhagen, and John Wheldon and Co., London; Vol. 1, Part 2, pp. 251–324. 1928.
- The aerial algæ of Iceland. The Botany of Iceland, edited by L. Kolderup Rosenvinge & E. Warming, J. Frimodt, Copenhagen, and John Wheldon and Co., London; Vol. 1, Part 2, pp. 325–447. 1928.
- JBP & Hansen, Benth J. (1960) Elektronen-mikroskopische Untersuchungen von zwei Arten der Heliozoen-Gattung Acanthocystis. Archiv für Protistenkunde 104: 547–553.
