= Johannes Grøntved =

Danish botanist (1882–1956)

Johannes Grøntved (25 January 1882 – 11 July 1956) was a Danish botanist. He made investigations of flora and vegetation in Denmark, the Faroe Islands, Iceland, Greenland and Estonia. He was editor of The Botany of Iceland from vol. 3 part 2.

== Selected scientific works ==
- Grøntved, J. (1927) Formationsstatistiske Undersøgelser paa nogle danske Overdrev. Botanisk Tidsskrift 40: 1-71. Used Raunkiær's quantitative method to describe grassland vegetation. The data were later used by Thorvald Sørensen in developing his quotient of similarity.
- Grøntved, J. (1927) Die Flora der Insel Wormsö - Ein Beitrag zur Flora Estlands. Dansk Botanisk Arkiv 5 (4).
- Grøntved, J. (1927) Die Flora der Insel Runö. Svensk Botanisk Tidskrift 23: 399–460.
- Ostenfeld, C.H. & Grøntved, Johs. (1934) The Flora of Iceland and the Færoes. Copenhagen.
- Grøntved, J. (1939) Polygonaceernes Udbredelse i Danmark [The distribution in Denmark of Polygonaceae]. Botanisk Tidsskrift 45: 10–58.
- Grøntved, J. & Sørensen, T. (1941) Nøgle til bestemmelse af danske græsser i blomsterløs tilstand [Determination key to vegetative grasses in Denmark]. Munksgaard, København.
- Grøntved, Johs. (1942) The pteridophyta and spermatophyta of Iceland. The Botany of Iceland, edited by Johannes Grøntved, Ove Paulsen and Thorvald Sørensen. Einar Munksgaard, Copenhagen; Vol. 4, Part 1, pp. 1–427. 1942.
- Grøntved, J. (1954) Typhaceernes og Sparganiaceernes udbredelse i Danmark [The distribution in Denmark of Typhaceae and Sparganiaceae]. Botanisk Tidsskrift 50: 209–238.
