= Hugo Osvald =

Hugo Osvald (1892–1970) was a Swedish botanist and plant ecologist specialized on mire ecology, Sphagnum and peat formation.

Osvald participated in the Third International Phytogeographic Excursion to Switzerland in 1923.
