= Christian E.O. Jensen =

Danish pharmacist and botanist

- Born: 1859
- Died: 1941 (aged 81–82)
- Education: University of Copenhagen
- Occupations: Pharmacist, botanist, bryologist

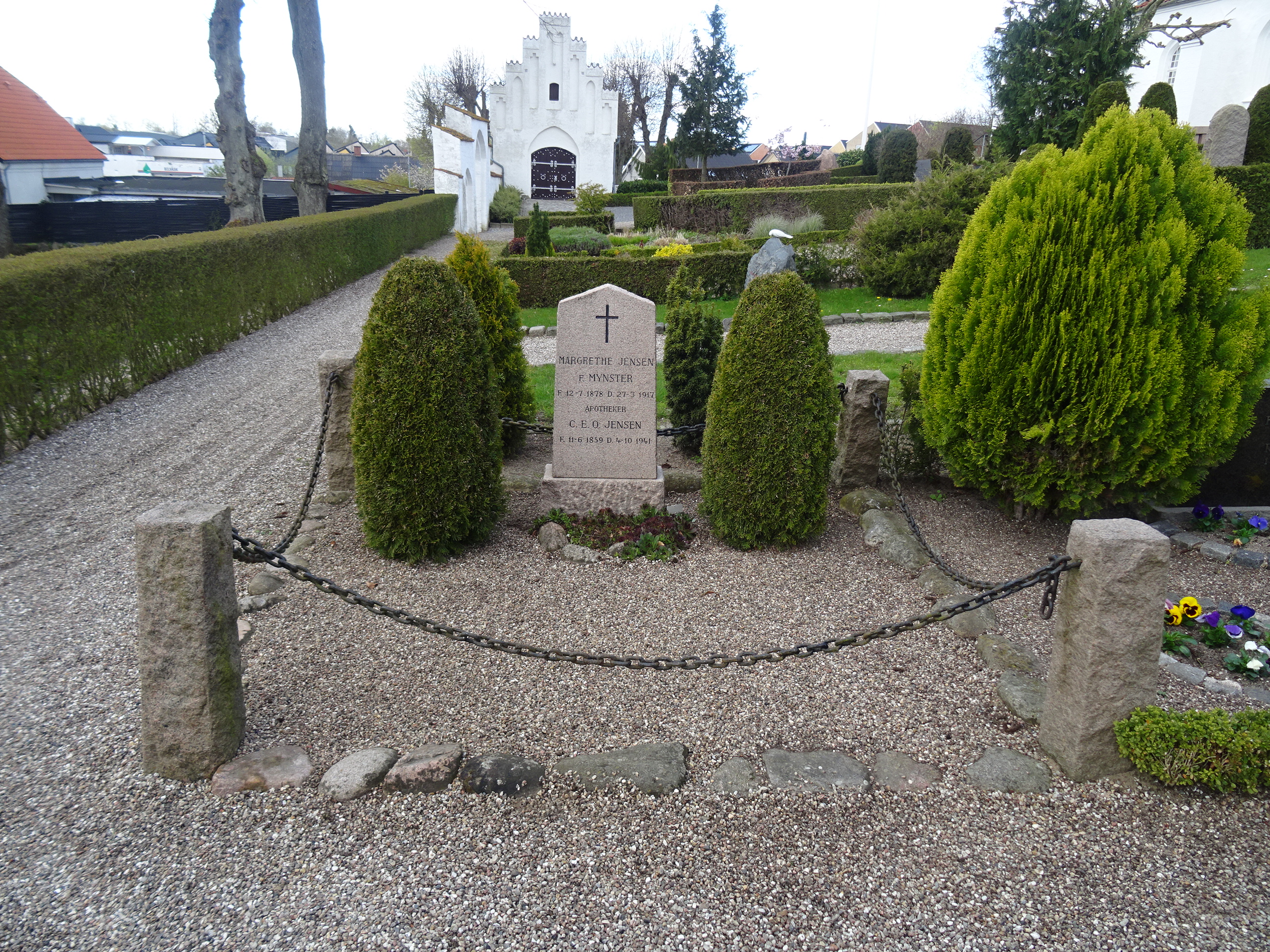
The grave of Christian E.O. Jensen in Hvalsø

Christian Erasmus Otterstrøm (Otterström) Jensen (1859–1941) was a Danish pharmacist and botanist, for decades a leading bryologist in Scandinavia. He studied botany and pharmaceutics at the University of Copenhagen and the Pharmaceutical College in Copenhagen. For the better part of his adult life, he ran a pharmacy in Hvalsø, Denmark, while devoting all available time to the study of mosses.

== Selected works ==
- Jensen, C. (1885) Mosser fra Novaia Zemlia, samlede paa Dijmphna Expeditionen 1882–83 af Th. Holm. In: Dijmphna-Togtets zoologiske-botaniske udbytte. Copenhagen.
- Jensen, C. (1915–1923) Danmarks Mosser – Eller beskrivelse af de i Danmark med Færøerne fundne bryofyter. Copenhagen, Gyldendalske Boghandel/Nordisk Forlag.
  - 1. Hepaticales, Anthocerotales og Sphagnales, 317 pp.
  - 2. Andreæales og Bryales, 569 pp.
- Jensen, C. (1909) Musci asiae borealis: Beschreibung der von schwedischen Expeditionen nach Sibirien in den Jahren 1875 und 1876 gesammelten Moose mit Berücksichtigung aller früheren bryologischen Angaben für das russische Nord-Asien. Dritter Teil: Torfmoose. Kungliga Svenska Vetenskapsakademiens Handlingar, Vol. 44, No. 5.
- Jensen, C. (1939) Skandinaviens Bladmosflora. Copenhagen.

== Sources ==
Paulsen, Ove (1941) Til Minde om Bryologen C. Jensen. Naturens Verden 1941.
