= Ole Olufsen =

Danish military officer and explorer (1865–1929)

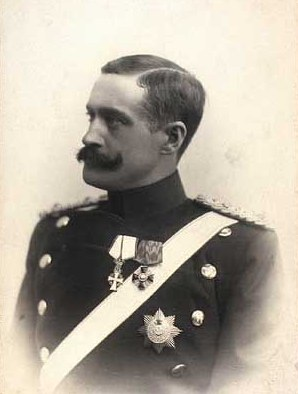
Ole Olufsen

Ole Olufsen (24 January 1865 – 13 December 1929) was a Danish military officer and explorer. He made several notable expeditions in the 1890s to the Emirate of Bukhara, including the Pamir Mountains. He also served as Secretary of the Royal Danish Geographical Society. Olufsen was a proponent of the idea that the peoples of the Pamirs retained traits of Avestan culture, a notion borrowed from the works of Wilhelm Geiger and Karoly Jeno Ujfalvy de Mezo-Kovesd, and that the region was still populated by adherents of Zoroastrianism. During his 1898-99 expeditions to the Pamirs, Olufsen was accompanied by Danish botanist Ove Paulsen.

== List of Publications ==
- O. Olufsen: "Den danske Pamir-Expedition" (Geografisk Tidsskrift, Bind 14; 1897)
- O. Olufsen: "Den anden danske Pamir-Expedition" (Geografisk Tidsskrift, Bind 15; 1899)
- O. Olufsen: "Den anden danske Pamir-Expedition. Foreløbig Beretning om nogle Arbejder foretagne i Alitschurpamir" (Geografisk Tidsskrift, Bind 15; 1899)
- O. Olufsen: "Den anden danske Pamirexpeditions Vinterstation 1898—99" (Geografisk Tidsskrift, Bind 15; 1899)
- O. Olufsen: "Den anden danske Pamirexpedition" (Geografisk Tidsskrift, Bind 16; 1901)
- O. Olufsen: "Den anden danske Pamirexpedition 1898—99. Rejse i Garan" (Geografisk Tidsskrift, Bind 16; 1901)
- O. Olufsen: "Sommeren i Centralasien fra Kaspihavet til Ferghanas Østgrænse" (Geografisk Tidsskrift, Bind 16; 1901)
- O. Olufsen: "Beboelser og Beboelsesforhold i Bokhara, Khiva og Turkestan" (Geografisk Tidsskrift, Bind 17; 1903)
- O. Olufsen: "Muhamedanske Gravminder i Transkaspien, Khiva, Bokhara, Turkestan og Pamir, I" (Geografisk Tidsskrift, Bind 17; 1903)
- O. Olufsen: "Muhamedanske Gravminder i Transkaspien, Khiva, Bokhara, Turkestan og Pamir, II" (Geografisk Tidsskrift, Bind 17; 1903)
- Ole Olufsen: "Meteorological Observations from Pamir 1898—99" (København 1903),
- O. Olufsen: "Centralasiens Moskeer, Medresseer og deres Gejstlighed" (Geografisk Tidsskrift, Bind 17; 1903)
- O. Olufsen: "Pamir. Alaisteppen, den afløbsløse Se Kara Kul i det «de Ørken-Pamir og Ruten over Bjærgene mod Syd til Murghabfloden" (Geografisk Tidsskrift, Bind 17; 1903)
- O. Olufsen: "Tibet og Spørgsmaalet Lhasa" (Geografisk Tidsskrift, Bind 17; 1903)
- Ole Olufsen: "The second Danish Pamir-Expedition: old and new architecture in Khiva, Bokhara, and Turkestan" (Copenhagen 1904)
- Ole Olufsen: "Through the unknown Pamirs" (London 1904)
- Ole Olufsen: "Through the Pamir (Vakhan and Garan)" (London 1904)
- Ole Olufsen: "Old and new Architecture in Khiva, Bokhara and Turkestan" (København 1904),
- O. Olufsen: "Tibet" (Geografisk Tidsskrift, Bind 18; 1905)
- Ole Olufsen: "A Vocabulary of the Dialect of Bokhara" (København 1905)
- O. Olufsen (anmeldelse af: Western Tibet and the british Borderland; London 1906, i: Geografisk Tidsskrift, Bind 18; 1905)
- O. Olufsen: "Tsad-Søen" (Geografisk Tidsskrift, Bind 18; 1905)
- O. Olufsen: "Oasen Merv" (Geografisk Tidsskrift, Bind 18; 1905)
- O. Olufsen: "Seistan" (Geografisk Tidsskrift, Bind 18; 1905)
- O. Olufsen: "Gennem Transkaspiens Stepper og Ørkener" (Geografisk Tidsskrift, Bind 18; 1905)
- O. Olufsen: "Pamir. Rejse igennem Roshan, Darvas og Karategin" (Geografisk Tidsskrift, Bind 18; 1905)
- O. Olufsen: "Pamir. Rejse igennem Roshan, Darvas og Karategin" (fortsat) (Geografisk Tidsskrift, Bind 18; 1905)
- Ole Olufsen: "Gennem Pamir" (1906)
- Ole Olufsen: "Indtryk fra mine Rejser i Terekdistriktet og Nord-Kaukasus. Kosakkernes, Kabardinernes og Osseternes Land" (Geografisk Tidsskrift, Bind 19; 1907)
- Ole Olufsen: "Indtryk fra mine Rejser i Terekdistriktet og Nord-Kaukasus. II. En Udflugt til Osseternes Land" (Geografisk Tidsskrift, Bind 19; 1907)
- Ole Olufsen: "Samfærdsels- og Transportmidler i Indre-Asien" (Geografisk Tidsskrift, Bind 19; 1907)
- Ole Olufsen: "Det kongelige danske geografiske Selskabs Bibliotek og Læsestue" (Geografisk Tidsskrift, Bind 19; 1907)
- Ole Olufsen:(Geografisk Tidsskrift, Bind 19; 1908)
- Ole Olufsen: "Sovesygen i Afrika" (Geografisk Tidsskrift, Bind 21; 1911)
- Ole Olufsen: "Tripolitanien. (Tripolis.)" (Geografisk Tidsskrift, Bind 21; 1911)
- Ole Olufsen: "The Emir of Bokhara and his Country" (København 1911).
- Ole Olufsen: "Tunisiske Landskaber og deres Økonomi under det franske Herredømme" (Geografisk Tidsskrift, Bind 22; 1913)
- Ole Olufsen: "Den transkontinentale Ekskursion 1912 igennem De Forenede Stater i Nordamerika" (Geografisk Tidsskrift, Bind 22; 1913)
- Ole Olufsen: "Den transkontinentale Ekskursion 1912 igennem De Forenede Stater i Nordamerika" (Geografisk Tidsskrift, Bind 22; 1913)
- Ole Olufsen: "Sahara" (H. Hagerups Forlag, København 1915)
- Ole Olufsen: "Afghanistan" (Geografisk Tidsskrift, Bind 23; 1915)
- Ole Olufsen: "Sand-Ørkenen Store el Erg i Sahara" (Geografisk Tidsskrift, Bind 23; 1915)
- Ole Olufsen: "Muhammedanske Grave og Gravminder i Sahara og Tunisien" (Geografisk Tidsskrift, Bind 23; 1915)
- Ole Olufsen: "Muhammedanske Grave og Gravminder i Sahara og Tunisien" (Geografisk Tidsskrift, Bind 23; 1915)
- Ole Olufsen: "Sir Clements Markham" (Geografisk Tidsskrift, Bind 23; 1915)
- O. Olufsen: "Yellowstone Nationalpark" (Udvalget for Folkeoplysnings Fremme. København 1916)
- Ole Olufsen: "Lidt om Syd-Arabien" (Geografisk Tidsskrift, Bind 25; 1919)
- Ole Olufsen: "Russisk Turkestan (Vest-Turkestan)" (Geografisk Tidsskrift, Bind 24; 1918)
- Ole Olufsen: "Russisk Turkestan" (Geografisk Tidsskrift, Bind 24; 1918)
- Ole Olufsen: "Centralasiens Jærnbaner" (Geografisk Tidsskrift, Bind 24; 1918)
- Ole Olufsen: "Hvad producerer Persien?" (Geografisk Tidsskrift, Bind 24; 1918)
- Ole Olufsen: "Amu Darja og Usboi" (Geografisk Tidsskrift, Bind 25; 1919)
- Ole Olufsen: "Marokko" (Geografisk Tidsskrift, Bind 25; 1919)
- Ole Olufsen: "Prinse-Øerne" (Geografisk Tidsskrift, Bind 25; 1919)
- Ole Olufsen: "Persiske Byer. (Det engelske Asien)" (Geografisk Tidsskrift, Bind 25; 1919)
- Ole Olufsen: "Mindre Meddelelser" (Geografisk Tidsskrift, Bind 25; 1919) (om Venezuela)
- Ole Olufsen: "Sir Ernest Shackleton" (Geografisk Tidsskrift, Bind 26; 1921)
- Ole Olufsen: "M. Alfred Grandidier" (Geografisk Tidsskrift, Bind 26; 1921)
- Ole Olufsen: "Julius von Hann. Død den 1. Oktober 1921" (Geografisk Tidsskrift, Bind 26; 1921)
- Ole Olufsen: "O. Olufsens Sahara Ekspedition 1922-23"(Geografisk Tidsskrift, Bind 26; 1921)
- Ole Olufsen: "O. Olufsens Sahara Ekspedition 1922-23" (Geografisk Tidsskrift, Bind 27; 1924)
- Ole Olufsen: "Det kongelige danske geografiske Selskab 1903-1923" (Geografisk Tidsskrift, Bind 27; 1924)
- O. Olufsen: "Hos Ørkenens Sønner. Olufs ens Sahara-Ekspedition 1922-23" (H. Hagerup, København 1924)
