= Marie Brockmann-Jerosch =

Swiss botanist and phylogeographer (1877–1952)

Dr. Marie Charlotte Brockmann-Jerosch
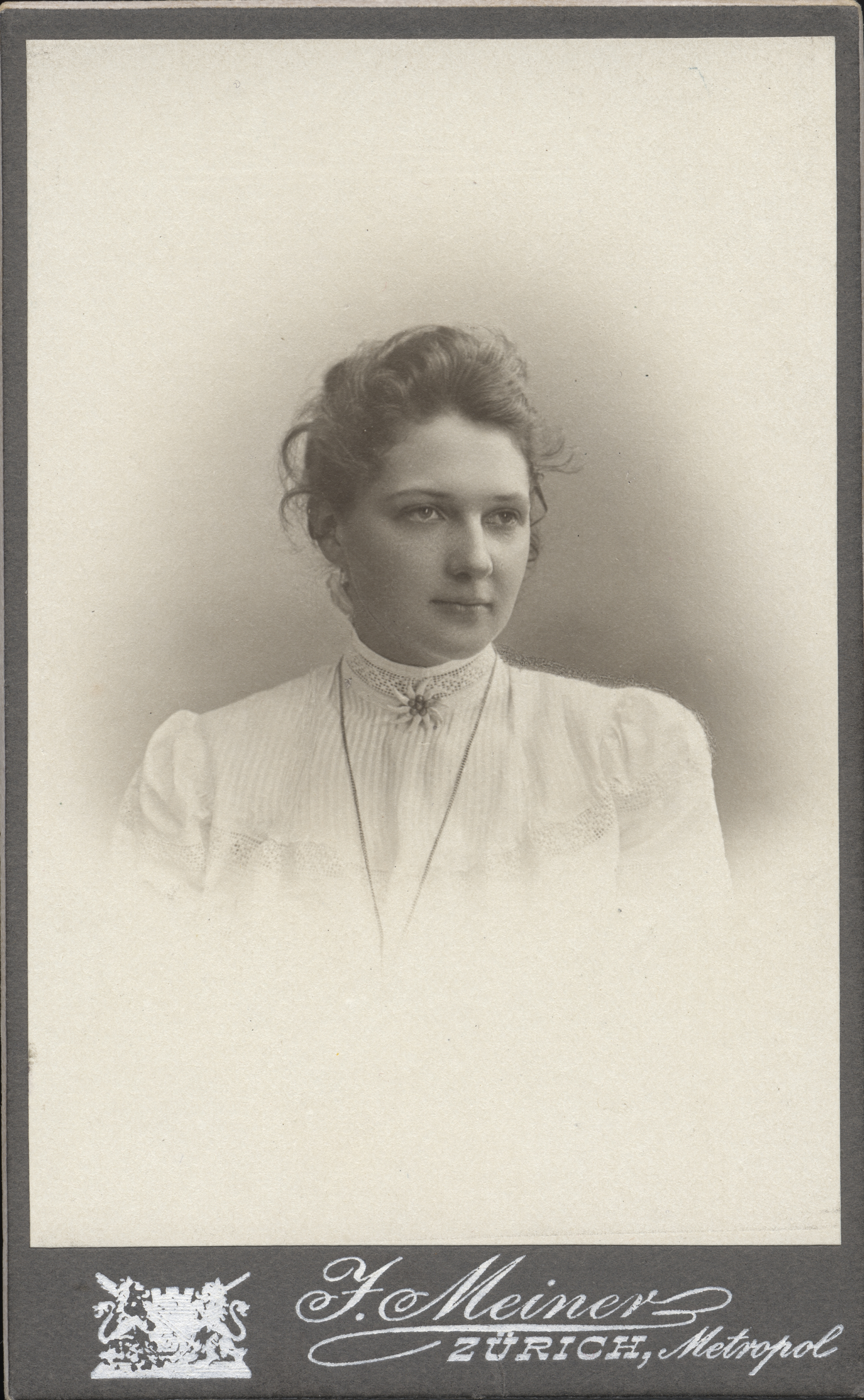
- Marie Brockmann-Jerosch around 1901
- Born: April 24, 1877; Lisbon
- Died: November 14, 1952 (aged 75); Zürich
- Occupation: botanist
- Known for: phylogeography

Academic background
- Education: University of Zürich

Dr. Marie Charlotte Brockmann-Jerosch (born 24 April 1877, Lisbon, d. 14 November 1952, Zürich) was a Swiss botanist noted for her influential research on alpine flora and phylogeography. She received her Ph.D. from the University of Zurich in 1905. She was married to Heinrich Brockmann-Jerosch, and in 1913 they both joined the second International Phytogeographic Excursion, a two-month tour of by international scientists of North American biogeography, exploring New York, Illinois, Michigan, Nebraska, and Colorado.

== Works ==
- Brockmann-Jerosch, Marie Charlotte (1903). Geschichte und Herkunft der schweizerischen Alpenflora. Eine Übersicht über den gegenwärtigen Stand der Frage (in German). W. Engelmann. OCLC 4962283.
- Schröter, Carl; Brockmann-Jerosch, H; Brockmann-Jerosch, Marie Charlotte; Günthart, August; Huber-Pestalozzi, Gottfried (1926). Das Pflanzenleben der Alpen. Eine Schilderung der Hochgebirgsflora (in German). A. Raustein. OCLC 4960282.
- Brockmann-Jerosch, Marie Charlotte; Heim, Albert (1952). Albert Heim; Leben und Forschung (in German). Wepf. OCLC 3622721.
- Heim, Albert; Brockmann-Jerosch, Marie Charlotte; Heim, Arnold; Blumer, Ernst (1905). Das Säntisgebirge (in German). In Kommission bei A. Francke (vorm. Schmid & Francke). OCLC 693194965.
- Brockmann-Jerosch, H; Brockmann-Jerosch, Marie (1925). Jamaika (in German). G. Fischer. OCLC 19993797.
- Jerosch, Marie Ch (1904). Die Querstörungen im mittleren Teil des Säntisgebirges (in German). OCLC 55231548.
- Brockmann-Jerosch, H; Brockmann-Jerosch, Marie (1910). Die fossilen pflanzenreste des glazialen delta bei Kaltbrunn (bei Uznach, Kanton St. Gallen) und deren bedeutung für die auffassung des wesens der eiszeit ... (in German). In kommission bei der Fehr'schen buchhandlung. OCLC 34050270.
- Brockmann-Jerosch, H; Brockmann-Jerosch, Marie Charlotte (1910). Die natürlichen Wälder der Schweiz (in German). Druck von Zürcher & Furrer. OCLC 19259966.
