= Ove Paulsen =

Danish botanist (1874–1947)

Ove Vilhelm Paulsen (22 March 1874 – 29 April 1947) was a Danish botanist.

== Biography ==
Paulsen was born at Aarhus, Denmark. He studied at the University of Copenhagen under professor Eugen Warming (1841-1924).

Paulsen was a keeper at the Botanical Museum of the University of Copenhagen from 1905 to 1920, when he became professor of botany at the Pharmaceutical College in Copenhagen, a position he held until 1947. He studied the flora of Denmark, plankton of the North Atlantic and the flora of Central Asia. He went on expeditions to Northern Persia and Pamir as early as 1898–1899. During his travels through Pamir, he was accompanied by the Danish explorer Ole Olufsen (1865–1929).

Ove Paulsen visited North America with the second International Phytogeographic Excursion from July to September 1913 and subsequently described the biome zonation from east to west in a paper.

The plant species Salsola paulsenii is among the many plant taxa named for him.

== Selected scientific works ==
- Børgesen, F. & Paulsen, O. (1898) Om Vegetationen paa de dansk-vestindiske Øer. København: Nordisk Forlag. 114 s. French edition 1900: La végétation des Antilles Danoises en francais par Mlle S.Eriksson. See notes under Børgesen.
- Ostenfeld, C.H. & Ove Paulsen (1910-1911) Marine plankton from the East-Greenland Sea (W. of 6° W. Long, and N. of 73° 30’ N. Lat.): collected by the "Danmark-Expedition" 1906–1908. Meddelelser om Grønland bd. 43 (11).
  - I : List of diatoms and flagellates / by C.H. Ostenfeld. 1910
  - II : Protozoa / by C.H. Ostenfeld. 1910
  - III : Peridiniales / by Ove Paulsen. 1910
  - IV : General remarks on the microplankton / by C.H. Ostenfeld and Ove Paulsen. 1911
- Paulsen, O. (1949) Observations on Dinoflagellates. (edited by J. Grøntved). Biologiske Skrifter / Kongelige Danske Videnskabernes Selskab 6 (4): 1-67.

== Works on Ove Paulsen ==
- Steemann Nielsen, E. (1949) Obituary in ICES Journal of Marine Science Vol. 16 (1): 14-15.
- Jessen, Knud (1947) Ove Vilhelm Paulsen 22. marts 1874 - 29. April 1947. Botanisk Tidsskrift vol. 48.
