= Ernst Østrup =

Danish botanist and phycologist

Ernst Vilhelm Østrup (21 September 1845 in Roskilde – 16 April 1917 in Frederiksberg) was a Danish botanist and phycologist, mainly working on diatoms.

In 1873 he received his cand. polyt. degree, and later worked as a schoolteacher in Copenhagen. His diatom research largely dealt with species found in Denmark, Greenland, Iceland, Faeroe Islands and Jan Mayen.

The diatom genus Oestrupia (Heiden) and the species Diploneis oestrupii (Hust.), Surirella oestrupii (Gran) and Navicula oestrupii (Cleve) are all named in his honour.

== Selected scientific works ==
- Ferskvands-Diatoméer fra Øst-Grønland. Meddelelser om Grønland 15: 251–290. 1898.
- Beiträge zur Kenntnis der Diatomeenflora des Kossogolbeckens in der nordwestlichen Mongolei. Hedwigia 48 (1–2): 74–100. 1909.
- Danske Diatoméer. C.A. Reitzel, København. 323 pp. (1910)
- Diatoms from North-east Greenland (N of 76 N.Lat.) collected by the Denmark Expedition. Meddelelser om Grønland 43 (10): 193–256. 1910.
- Diatomaceæ ex insulis Danicis Indiæ Occidentalis imprimis a F. Børgesen lectæ. Dansk Botanisk Arkiv vol. 1 (1): 1-29. (1913)
- Marine diatoms from the coasts of Iceland . The Botany of Iceland, edited by L. Kolderup Rosenvinge & E. Warming, J. Frimodt, Copenhagen, and John Wheldon and Co., London; Vol. 1, Part 2, pp. 345–394. 1916.
- Fresh-water diatoms from Iceland. The Botany of Iceland, edited by L. Kolderup Rosenvinge & E. Warming, J. Frimodt, Copenhagen, and John Wheldon and Co., London; Vol. 2, Part 1, pp. 1–100. 1918.
