= Julius Grøntved =

Danish botanist and phycologist

Julius Grøntved (sometimes spelled Gröntved) (5 February 1899 – 1 September 1967) was a Danish botanist and phycologist. He worked at the Danish Institute for Fisheries and Marine Research.

== Selected scientific works ==
- Grøntved, Julius & Seidenfaden, Gunnar (1938) The Phytoplankton of the waters West of Greenland (The Godthaab Expedition 1928: Leader: Eigil Riis-Carstensen). Meddelelser om Grønland 82 (5): 1-380.
- Grøntved, J. (1940) Das Wattenmeer bei Skallingen: Physiographisch-biologische Untersuchung eines dänischen Tidengebietes. 2. Quantitative und qualitative Untersuchung des Mikroplanktons während der Gezeiten. Folia Geographica Danica 2 (2): 1-67.
- Grøntved, J. (1948) On the taxonomy of the Dinoflagellates in general. Biologiske Skrifter / Kongelige Danske Videnskabernes Selskab 6 (1): 1−67.
- Bertelsen, E. & Grøntved, J. (1949) The light organs of a bathypelagic fish Argyropelecus olfersi (Cuvier) photographed by its own light. Videnskabelige Meddelelser fra Dansk naturhistorisk Forening 111 (3): 163-167.
- Grøntved, J. (1949) Dansk botanisk literatur i 1944, 1945, 1946 og 1947 [translated title: Danish botanical literature 1944-1947]. Botanisk Tidsskrift 48 (3).
- Grøntved, J. (1949) Investigations on the phytoplankton in the Danish Wadden Sea in July 1941. Meddelelser fra Kommissionen for Danmarks Fiskeri- og Havundersøgelser: Serie Plankton 5(2):1-55.
- Grøntved, J. (1950) Phytoplankton studies. 1. Nitzschia frigida Grun., an Arctic-inner-Baltic diatom found in Danish waters. Biologiske Meddelelser / Kongelige Danske Videnskabernes Selskab 18, 1-19.
- Grøntved, J. (1950) Phytoplankton studies. 2. A new biological type within the genus Chaetoceros, Chaetoceros sessilis sp.nov. Biologiske Meddelelser / Kongelige Danske Videnskabernes Selskab 18 (17): 1-19.
- Grøntved, J. (1950) The phytoplankton of Præstø Fjord. Folia Geographica Danica 3 (6): 143−186.
- Grøntved, J. (1951) Thichophrya danae sp.nov., a suctorial protozoan from Greenland waters. Meddelelser om Grønland 142 (8).
- Grøntved, J. (1952) Investigations on the phytoplankton in the southern North Sea in May 1947. Meddelelser fra Kommissionen for Danmarks Fiskeri- og Havundersøgelser: Serie Plankton 5 (1): 1-49.
- Braarud, Trygve; Gaarder, Karen Ringdal & Grøntved, J. (1953) The phytoplankton of the North Sea and adjacent waters in May, 1948. Rapports et procès-verbaux des réunions / Conseil Permanent International pour l'Exploration de la Mer 133: 1−87.
- Grøntved, J. (1954) Planktological contributions I. Meddelelser fra Danmarks Fiskeri- og Havundersøgelser, N.S. 1 (8): 1−7.
- Grøntved, J. (1956) Planktological contributions II. Taxonomical studies in some Danish coastal localities. Meddelelser fra Danmarks Fiskeri- og Havundersøgelser, N.S. 1 (12): 1−13.
- Grøntved, J. (1957) A sampler for underwater macrovegetation in shallow waters. Journal du Conseil / Conseil Permanent International pour l'Exploration de la Mer 22: 293-297.
- Grøntved, J. & Steemann Nielsen, E. 1957: Investigations on the phytoplankton in sheltered Danish marine localities. Meddelelser fra Kommissionen for Danmarks Fiskeri- og Havundersøgelser: Serie Plankton 5: 1−52.
- Grøntved, J. (1958) Underwater Macrovegetation in Shallow Coastal Waters. Journal du Conseil / Conseil Permanent International pour l'Exploration de la Mer 24: 32-42.
- Grøntved, J. (1960) Planktological contributions IV. Taxonomical and productional investigations in shallow coastal waters. Meddelelser fra Danmarks Fiskeri- og Havundersøgelser N.S. 3 (1): 1−17.
- Grøntved, J. (1960) On the productivity of microbenthos and phytoplankton in some Danish fjords. Meddelelser fra Danmarks Fiskeri- og Havundersøgelser, N.S. 3 (3): 55-92.
- Grøntved, J. (1962) Preliminary report on the productivity of microbenthos and phytoplankton in the Danish Wadden Sea. Meddelelser fra Danmarks Fiskeri- og Havundersøgelser, N.S. 3 (12): 347-378.
