= Helgi Jónsson =

Icelandic botanist and phycologist (1867–1925)

Helgi Jónsson (11 April 1867, Rangárvallasýsla – 1925) was an Icelandic botanist and phycologist.

He specialized in the research of marine algae and subarctic vegetation. During his career, he undertook many botanical trips throughout Iceland.

The diatom Navicula jonssonii Østrup is named after him.

== Main works ==
- The marine algae of Iceland. Botanisk Tidsskrift 25: 378–380. 1902–1903.
- The marine algae of East Greenland. Meddelelser om Grønland 30: 1-73. 1904.
- The marine algal vegetation of Iceland. 1912 The Botany of Iceland
