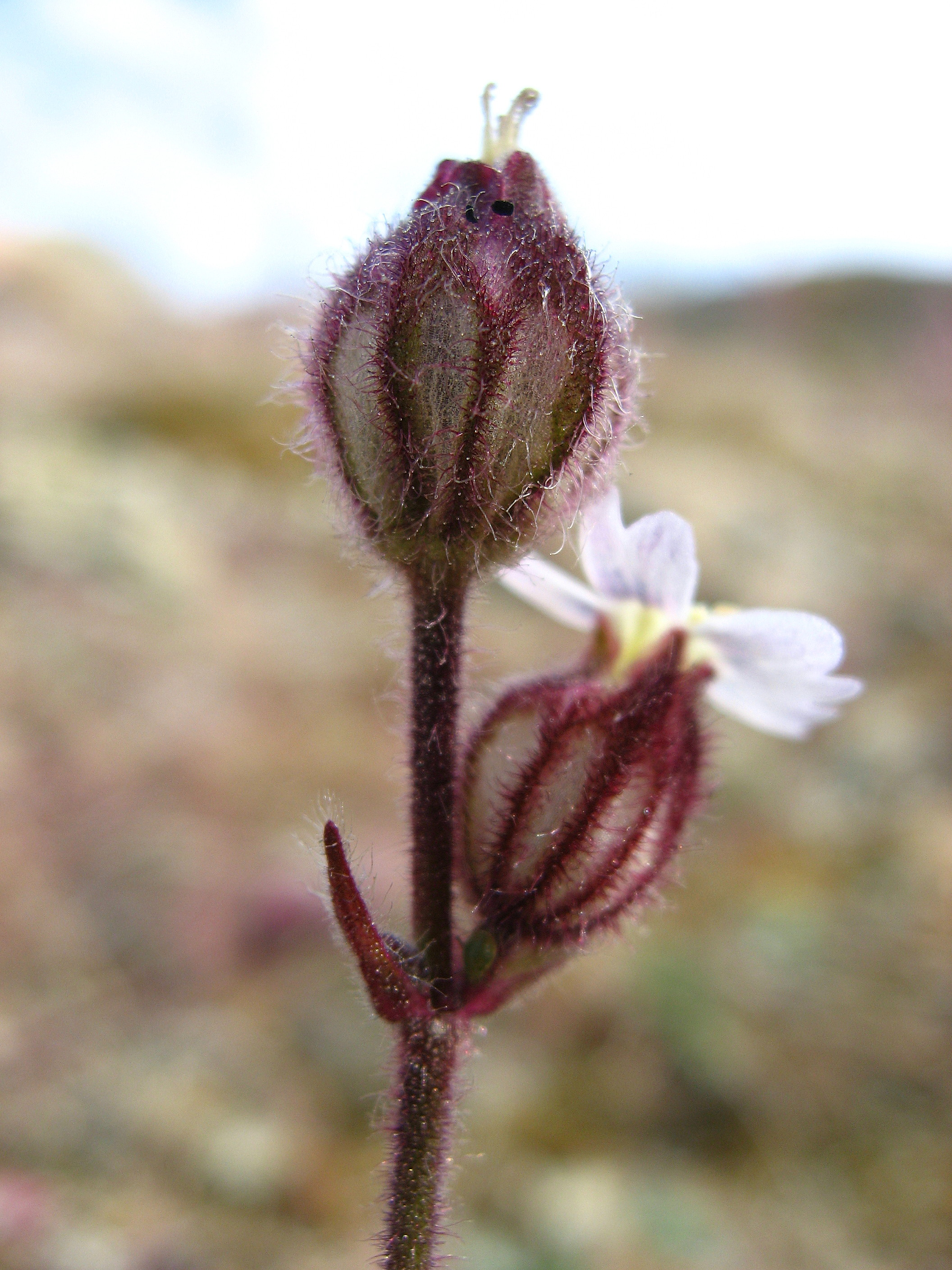

Scientific classification
- Kingdom: Plantae
- Clade: Embryophytes
- Clade: Tracheophytes
- Clade: Spermatophytes
- Clade: Angiosperms
- Clade: Eudicots
- Order: Caryophyllales
- Family: Caryophyllaceae
- Genus: Silene
- Species: S. sorensenis

Binomial name
- Silene sorensenis (B. Boivin) Bocquet

Synonyms
- Melandrium triflorum (R. Br. ex Sommerf.) J. Vahl; Lychnis triflora R. Br. ex Sommerf. Lychnis sorensenis Boivin

= Silene sorensenis =

Species of flowering plant

Silene sorensenis, the three-flowered campion or Sorensen's catchfly, is a species of plant in the family Caryophyllaceae. It is found in the tundra of the Canadian Arctic Archipelago, the Northern Russian Far East and Greenland.

This species was named after Danish botanist Thorvald Sørensen (1902–1973).
