= Frederik Børgesen =

Danish botanist and phycologist

Fredrik Børgesen
- Born: Fredrik Christian Emil Børgesen; 1 January 1866; Copenhagen, Denmark
- Died: 22 March 1956 (aged 90); Frederiksberg, Denmark
- Education: University of Copenhagen
- Scientific career
- Fields: Botany; Psychology
- Workplaces: University of Copenhagen

Fredrik Christian Emil Børgesen (1 January 1866 in Copenhagen – 22 March 1956 in Frederiksberg) was a Danish botanist and phycologist. He graduated in botany from the University of Copenhagen and was subsequently employed as an assistant at the Botanical Museum (1893–1900). His doctoral thesis dealt with the marine algae of the Faroe Islands (1904). Later, he became librarian at the Library of the Botanical Garden (1900–1935).

Børgesen made investigations of marine algae e.g. around India, Mauritius, the Canary Islands and the Antilles.

Many species have been named to his honour, e.g. Coccoloba borgesenii (Polygonaceae) and numerous algae, e.g. Hypnea boergesenii (Hypneaceae) and Padina boergesenii (Phaeophyceae).

== Selected publications ==
- Børgesen, F. & Paulsen, O. (1898) Om Vegetationen paa De dansk-vestindiske Øer. København: Nordisk Forlag. 114 pp.
  The work is a result of studies conducted during the expedition to Venezuela and the Antilles organized by Eugen Warming 1891–1892. The whole work has a distinct "Warmingian" appearance, organized as it is according to major vegetation types (halophytic vegetation, psammophytic vegetation, etc.) and with descriptions (incl. line drawings) of leaf and stem morphology in relation to habitat. Børgesen and Paulsen were students of Eugen Warming. Later, the both went their own ways, mainly to phycology and marine biology.
- Botany of the Færöes
  These three papers were later reprinted in one volume:
  - Børgesen, F. (1903) Marine algæ. In Vol. II, pp. 339–532. Copenhagen and London.
  - Børgesen, F. (1908) The algæ-vegetation of the Færöese coasts, with remarks on the phyto-geography. In Vol. III, pp. 683–834. Copenhagen and London.
  - Børgesen, F. & Jónsson, H. (1908) The distribution of the marine algæ of the Arctic Sea and of the northernmost part of the Atlantic. In Vol. III Appendix pp. i-xxviii.
- Børgesen, F. (1904) "Om Algevegetationen ved Færøernes Kyster". Gyldendalske Boghandel, Copenhagen. Doctoral dissertation, University of Copenhagen.
- Børgesen, F. & Raunkiær, C. (1918) Mosses and Lichens collected in the former Danish West Indies. Dansk Botanisk Arkiv 2(9):1-18.
- Børgesen, F. (1913–14) The marine Algæ of the Danish West Indies, Vol I. Chlorophyceæ and Phæophyceæ. Dansk Botanisk Arkiv 1(4) and 2(2). 226 pp.
- Børgesen, F. (1915–20) The marine Algæ of the Danish West Indies, Vol. II. Rhodophyceæ; with addenda to the Chlorophyceæ, Phæophyceæ and Rhodophyceæ. Dansk Botanisk Arkiv 3. 504 pp.
