= Plantesamfund =

1895 Danish book by Eugen Warming

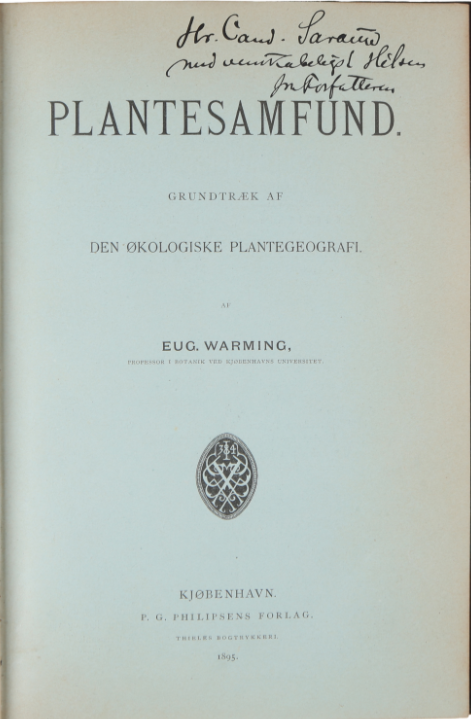
- Author: Eugen Warming
- Language: Danish
- Publication date: 1895

Plantesamfund - Grundtræk af den økologiske Plantegeografi, published in Danish in 1895 by Eugen Warming, and in English in 1909 as Oecology of Plants: An Introduction to the Study of Plant Communities, by Warming and Martin Vahl, was the first book to be published having the word ecology in its title. The book has had a lasting impact on the field of ecology, particularly in its German translation soon after its initial publication, and in its expanded and revised English translation.

The book was based on Warming's lectures on plant geography at the University of Copenhagen. It gives an introduction to all major biomes of the world. Its aim was to explain how nature solved similar problems (drought, flooding, cold, salt, herbivory) in similar way, despite using very different raw material (species of different descent) in different regions of the world.

- Warming, E. (1895) Plantesamfund - Grundtræk af den økologiske Plantegeografi. P.G. Philipsens Forlag, Kjøbenhavn. 335 pp.

== Translated editions ==
The book was translated to German in 1896 as

- Lehrbuch der ökologischen Pflanzengeographie - Eine Einführung in die Kenntnis der Pflanzenverenie by Emil Knoblauch. Berlin, Gebrüder Borntraeger, 1896. 412 pp.

This edition, which was approved by Warming, rapidly ran out of print. A second, unauthorized, edition was issued in 1902 by Paul Graebner, who put his own name after Warming's on the book's frontispiece, despite no changes to the contents. This edition was expanded in third and fourth editions:

- Warming, E. & Graebner, P. (1918) Eug. Warming's Lehrbuch der ökologischen Pflanzengeographie, 3 ed. Berlin, Gebrüder Borntrager. Fourth edn (1933) - 1158 pp.

A Polish translation of ’Plantesamfund’ (from Knoblauch's German translation) appeared in 1900:

- Warming, E. (1900) Zbiorowiska Roślinne zarys ekologicznej geografii roślin by Edward Strumpf and Jósef Trzebiński. Warszawa, 1900. 451 pp.

Two independent Russian (Moscow and St. Petersburg) editions appeared in 1901 and 1903

- Вармингъ, Е. (1901) Ойкологическая географія растеній – Введеніе въ изученіе растительныхъ сообществъ by M. Golenkin and W. Arnol'di. Moskva, 542 pp. Full text link
- Вармингъ, Е. (1903) Распредъленіе растений въ зависимости отъ внъшнихъ условій - Экологическая географія растеній by A. G. Henkel' and with a treatise of the vegetation of Russia by G. I. Tanfil'ev. St. Petersburg, 474 pp.

An extended and translated edition in English first appeared in 1909:

- Warming, E. with M. Vahl (1909) Oecology of Plants - an introduction to the study of plant-communities by P. Groom and I. B. Balfour. Clarendon Press, Oxford. 422 pp. (2nd edn 1925). Reprinted a number of times, most recently by Biotech Books, Delhi ISBN 81-7622-010-8

It is unknown why an English translation only appeared fourteen years after the Danish original. In Warming's private correspondence, he mentions to have received a letter from "a professor from Belleville, Illinois, who wishes to translate Plantesamfund" (May 1898, letter to his son Jens).

== The impact of Plantesamfund ==
It was Eugenius Warming's Lehrbuch der ökologischen Pflanzengeographie that must be considered as the starting point of self-conscious ecology. This book was the first to use physiological relations between plants and their environment, and in addition biotic interactions to explain the moulding of the assemblages that plant geographers had described and classified, and it would set up a research agenda for decades to come.

Despite the language barrier, Warming's influence on the development of ecology is remarkable, not the least in Britain and the USA. The British ecologist Arthur Tansley was extremely influenced by reading ’Plantesamfund’ (or rather the 1896 German edition). Reading the book made him jump from anatomy to ecology.

The German translation was widely read in England and America and played an important part in stimulating fieldwork in both, countries. It certainly did in my own case: I well remember working through it with enthusiasm in 1898 and going out into the field to see how far one could match the plant communities Warming had described for Denmark in the English countryside; and I also made the book the basis of a course of University Extension lectures at Toynbee Hall in 1899.

Similarly, Warming's book impregnated North American naturalists like Henry Chandler Cowles and Frederic Clements. Cowles appear to have been completely taken:

Charles J. Chamberlain, who attended Coulter's lectures as a student and later joined the University of Chicago faculty, recalled in a memoir that ‘none of us could read Danish except a Danish student, who would translate a couple of chapters, and the next day Coulter would give a wonderful lecture on Ecology ... Cowles, with his superior knowledge of taxonomy and geology, understood more than the rest of us, and became so interested that he studied Danish and, long before any translation appeared, could read the book in the original ... The treatment of such sand dunes as Warming knew, started Henry on his study of the comparatively immense moving dunes south of the University.

== Schimper's Pflanzengeographie auf physiologisher Grundlage ==
The German ecologist A.F.W. Schimper published Pflanzengeographie auf physiologisher Grundlage in 1898 (in English 1903 as Plant-geography upon a physiological basis translated by W.R. Fischer, Oxford: Clarendon press, 839 pp.). Some authors have contended that part of the book was a case of plagiarism with heavy unacknowledged borrowing from Plantesamfund.

"This work not only covered much of the same ground as Warming did in 1895 and 1896 but in fact also leaned heavily on Warming's research. Schimper (1898) quoted extensively from more than fifteen of Warming’s works and even reproduced Warming’s figures. Yet nowhere did Schimper acknowledge his profound debt to Warming, neither in the list of picture credits, nor in the acknowledgements section of the Vorwort, nor in his list of major sources, and not even in a footnote! ... Although replete with Warming's data, it contains few ideas and did not advance ecology beyond what Warming had done earlier.”

Schimper's book is organized in three parts, (1) The factors, (2) Formations and mutualisms, and (3) Zones and regions. The third part is by far the largest (more than 3/4). It contains subsections on the Tropics, the Temperate zone, The Arctic, the Alpine regions and the Aquatic environments. This section is organized in a rather traditional way (leaning on de Candolle and others), but is full of Schimper's original observations from his travels throughout the World. The first part is organized in chapters about water, temperature, light, air, soil and animals, i.e. following the overall organization of Plantesamfund. The second part has chapters on plant communities under particular environmental control and about lianas, epiphytes and parasites. Schimper lists the literature used after each chapter and, for the chapters in the first two parts, Warming’s Lehrbuch der ökologischen Pflanzengeographie (Plantesamfund in the 1896 German translation) is included in every case. Yet, despite leaning heavily on this work with regard to both structure, content and illustrations of parts one and two, Schimper does not include Warming in his acknowledgements in the foreword (43 named individuals are thanked) nor does he include Plantesamfund in the short list of highly recommended readings at the end of the foreword (de Candolle’s Géographie botanique raisonnée (1855), Grisebach’s Die Vegetation der Erde (1872), Drude’s Handbuch der Pflanzengeographie (1890) and Atlas der Pflanzenverbreitung (1887) and Engler’s Versuch einen Entwicklungsgeschickte der Pflanzenwelt (1879-1882)). Taken together it clearly gives the impression that Schimper has been suspiciously economic with acknowledgements of his great intellectual debts to Warming.

== Contents ==
Contents of ’Plantesamfund’ and 'Oecology of Plants' compared
Plantesamfund	Oecology of Plants
Indledning	Introduction
Kap. 1 Floristisk og økologisk Plantegeografi	Ch. I. Floristic and Ecological Plant Geography
Kap. 2. Livsform (Vegetationsform)	Ch. II. Growth Form

The text on growth forms was written anew by Warming for 'Oecology of Plants'

Kap. 3 Plantesamfundene	Ch. III. Plant Communities
Kap. 4. Oversigt over Indholdet af det Følgende	Ch. IV. Plan of This Book
Første Afsnit. Økologiske Faktorer og deres Virkninger	Section I. Oecological Factors and Their Action
Kap. 1 Luftens Sammensætning
Kap. 2. Lyset	Ch. V. Light
Kap. 3. Varme	Ch. VI. Heat
Kap. 4. Luftfugtighed og Nedbør	Ch. VII. Atmospheric Humidity and Precipitations
Kap. 5. Luftbevægelserne	Ch. VIII. Movements of the Air
Kap. 6. Næringsbundens Beskaffenhed	Ch. IX. Nature of the Nutrient Substratum
Kap. 7. Jordbundens Bygning	Ch. X. Structure of the Soil
Kap. 8. Luften i Jordbunden	Ch. XI. Air in the Soil
Kap. 9. Vandet i Jordbunden	Ch. XII. Water in the Soil
Kap. 10. Jordbundens Varme	Ch. XIII. Temperature of Soil
Kap. 11. Jordbundens Mægtighed; Overgrund og Undergrund	Ch. XIV. Depth of the Soil. The upper layers of the soil and subsoil
Kap. 12. Næringen i Jordbunden	Ch. XV. Nutriment in Soil
Kap. 13. Arter af Jordbund	Ch. XVI. Kinds of Soil
Kap. 14. Ere Jordbundens kemiske eller fysiske Egenskaber de vigtigste?	Ch. XVII. Are the Chemical or the Physical Characters of Soil the more Important?
Kap. 15. Virkningen af et livløst Dække over Plantevæxten	Ch. XVIII. The Effect of a Non-Living Covering over Vegetation
Kap. 16. Virkningerne af et levende Plantedække paa Jordbunden	Ch. XIX. Effect of a Living Vegetable Covering on Soil
Kap. 17. Dyrs og Planters Virksomhed i Jordbunden	Ch. XX. The Activities of Plants and Animals in Soil
Kap. 18. Nogle orografiske o. a. Faktorer	Ch. XXI. Exposure. Orographic and other Factors
Andet Afsnit. Samliv og Samfund	Section II. Communal Life of Organisms
Kap. 1. Samliv mellem de levende Væsener	Ch. XXII. Reciprocal Relations among Organisms
Kap. 2. Menneskets Indgriben	Ch. XXIII. Interference by Man
Kap. 3. Samlivet med Dyrene	Ch. XXIV. Symbiosis of Plants with Animals
Kap. 4. Samliv mellem Planterne indbyrdes	Ch. XXV. Symbiosis of Plants with One Another. Mutualism
Kap. 5. Kommensalisme; Samfund	Ch. XXVI. Commensalism. Plant-communities
Kap. 6. Samfundsklasser-
	Section III. Adaptations of Aquatic and Terrestrial Plants. Oecological Classification
	Ch. XXVII. Aquatic and Terrestrial Plants
	Ch. XXVIII. Adaptations of Water-plants (Hydrophytes)
	Ch. XXIX. Adaptations of Land-plants
	Ch. XXX. Regulation of Transpiration in Land-plants
	Ch. XXXI. Absorption of Water by Land-plants
	Ch. XXXII. Storage of Water by Land-plants. Water Reservoirs
	Ch. XXXIII. Other Structural Characters and Growth-forms of Land-plants, and Especially of Xerophytes
	Ch. XXXIV. Oecological Classification
	Ch. XXXV. Physiognomy of Vegetation. Formations. Associations. Varieties of Associations
Tredje Afsnit. Hydrofyt-Samfundene	Hydrophytes. Formations of Aquatic Plants
Kap.1. Økologiske Faktorer	Ch. XXXVI. Oecological Factors
Kap. 2. Morfologisk og anden Tilpasning
Ch. XXXVII. Formations of Aquatic Plants
Kap. 3. Svævet (Plankton)	Ch. XXXVIII. Plankton-formation
Kap. 4. Den glaciale Vegetation (Isens og Sneens)	Ch. XXXIX. Cryoplankton. Vegetation on Ice and Snow
Kap. 5. Saprofile Flagellaters Samfund
	Ch. XL. Hydrocharid-formation or Pleuston
Kap. 7. Bund-Vegetationerne
Kap. 8. Nereïdernes (de stenelskende Hydrofyters) Samfund	Ch. XLI. Lithophilous Benthos
Kap. 9. Samfund af Vandplanter paa løs Bund	Ch. XLII. Benthos of Loose Soil
Kap. 10. Enalidernes (Havgræssenes) Samfundsklasse
Kap. 11. Limnæernes Samfundsklasse
Kap. 12. Myxofyce-Samfund
Helophytes. Marsh-plants
	Ch. XLIII. Adaptation. Formations
Kap. 14. Rørsumpene	Ch. XLIV. Reed-swamp or Reed-formation

== New conceptual terms ==
In ‘Plantesamfund’, Warming coined the words hydrophyte, mesophyte, xerophyte and halophyte.

- Hydrophyte - An aquatic plant; a plant which lives and grows in water.
- Mesophyte - A name given to plants which grow naturally in conditions of intermediate soil moisture.
- Xerophyte - A plant that is able to grow where the water supply is small. Xerophytes are plants that are able to control the loss of water from their aërial parts. Xerophytes employ many different tools to control the loss of water, such as; waxy deposits, varnish, or mineral crusts on the epidermis; reduction of air spaces; storage organs; thick-walled epidermis; and cork in woody plants. Some xerophytes are annual plants that grow quickly during the rainy season.
- Halophyte - A plant which grows in salt-impregnated soils.
