= Thorvald Sørensen =

Danish botanist and evolutionary biologist

Thorvald Julius Sørensen
- Born: 4 July 1902; Sækbæk, Denmark
- Died: 21 June 1973 (aged 70); Copenhagen
- Education: University of Copenhagen
- Known for: Flora of the Arctic, Sørensen similarity index
- Scientific career
- Fields: Botany
- Workplaces: University of Copenhagen

Thorvald (Thorwald) Julius Sørensen (4 July 1902 – 21 June 1973) was a Danish botanist and evolutionary biologist.

== Biography ==
Sørensen was professor at the Royal Veterinary and Agricultural University 1953–1955 and at the University of Copenhagen 1955–1972. He was director of the Copenhagen Botanical Garden and Botanical Museum during the same period.

Thorvald Sørensen spent the years 1931–1935, based on Ella Island, studying plants in the then little known North-East Greenland. He published the botanical research of the Three-year Expedition to East Greenland. He also published a doctoral thesis on the annual phenological rhythm of the High Arctic plant species, including the pollination of their flowers (1941).

He critically revised the Greenland flora and sorted out taxonomy of a number of difficult taxa, most notably Puccinellia.

He carried out a number of studies in the evolutionary biology of plants, such as Taraxacum, Capsella bursa-pastoris and Ranunculus.

He developed a quotient of similarity in species composition between plant communities—the still much-used Sørensen similarity index. He illustrated its use on a data set collected in Danish grassland by Johannes Grøntved (1882-1956), who used the quantitative method to sample vegetation developed by Christen C. Raunkiær (1860–1938).

== Selected plant names he published ==
- Braya intermedia T.J.Sørensen (1954) in Meddelelser om Grønland 134 (8).
- Puccinellia groenlandica T.J.Sørensen (1953) in Meddelelser om Grønland 134 (3).

== Honours ==
The Arctic campion species Silene sorensenis and Th. Sørensen Land in Greenland were named in his honour.

== Selected publications ==
- Sørensen, T. (1935) Bodenformen und Pflanzendecke in Nordostgrönland. Beiträge zur Theorie der polaren Bodenversetzungen auf Grund von Beobachtungen über deren Einfluss auf die Vegetation in Nordostgrönland. Meddelelser om Grønland 93 (4).
- Sørensen, T. (1941) Temperature relations and phenology of the Northeast Greenland flowering plants. Meddelelser om Grønland 129: 1–305.
- Sørensen, T. (1942) Untersuchungen über die Therophytengesellschaften auf den isländischen Lehmflächen ("Flags"). Biologiske Skrifter / Kongelige Danske Videnskabernes Selskab 2 (2).
- Sørensen, T. and Gudjónsson, Gudni (1946) Spontaneous chromosome-aberrants in apomictic Taraxaca: morphological and cyto-genetical investigations. Biologiske Skrifter / Kongelige Danske Videnskabernes Selskab 4 (2).
- Sørensen, T. (1948) A method of establishing groups of equal amplitude in plant sociology based on similarity of species and its application to analyses of the vegetation on Danish commons. Biologiske Skrifter / Kongelige Danske Videnskabernes Selskab 5: 1-34.
- Sørensen, T. (1953) A Revision of the Greenland Species of Puccinellia Parl. With contribution to our knowledge of the Arctic Puccinellia flora in general. Meddelelser om Grønland 136 (3) 1–179.
- Jørgensen, C.A., Sørensen, T. and Westergaard, M. (1958) The Flowering Plants of Greenland. Biologiske Skrifter / Kongelige Danske Videnskabernes Selskab 9 (4).

== Other sources ==
- Obituary in Botanisk Tidsskrift 68 (2): 165-168 (1973)
