= Carl Hansen Ostenfeld =

Danish systematic botanist

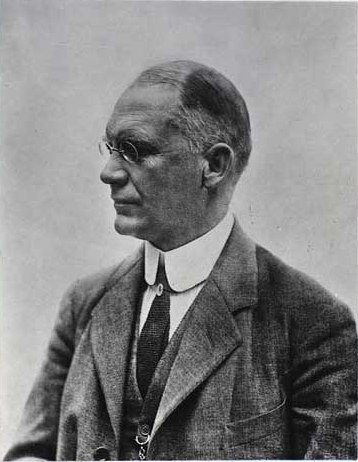
Carl Hansen Ostenfeld

Carl Emil Hansen Ostenfeld (born Carl Emil Ostenfeld-Hansen) (3 August 1873 – 16 January 1931) was a Danish systematic botanist. He graduated from the University of Copenhagen under professor Eugenius Warming. He was a keeper at the Botanical Museum 1900–1918, when he became professor of botany at the Royal Veterinary and Agricultural University. In 1923, by the early retirement of Raunkiær's, Ostenfeld became professor of botany at the University of Copenhagen and director of the Copenhagen Botanical Garden, both positions held until his death in 1931. He was a member of the Royal Danish Academy of Sciences and Letters and served on the board of directors of the Carlsberg Foundation.

Ostenfeld is known as an explorer of the Danish flora, including marine plankton, as well as the flora of Western Australia.

Ostenfeld participated in the Ingolf expedition (1885-86) to the waters around Iceland and Greenland, and in 1911 in the International Phytogeographic Excursion to the British Isles. The party studied the flora of parts of Ireland, including Killarney, Connemara and The Burren.

In collaboration with O. Rosenberg, he was one of the first to confirm that some plants could form asexual seeds, now called (apomixis). Their experiments repeated those of Gregor Mendel with Hieracium hybrids, showing that Mendel had observed a mixture of sexual recombination and apomixis.

== Taxon named in his honor ==
About a dozen plant species are named after him.

- The fish Diaphus ostenfeldi Tåning, 1932, the Ostenfeld's lanternfish, is a species of lanternfish found Worldwide.

== Honours ==
Also some geographical features in Greenland bear names that commemorate him:

- C.H. Ostenfeld Land in Northeast Greenland 75°15′N 21°32′W
- C.H. Ostenfeld Nunatak in Wordie's Glacier, Northeast Greenland 74°17′N 22°56′W
- C.H. Ostenfeld Glacier in Victoria Fjord, Northwest Greenland

The French Academy of Sciences awarded him the Prix Desmazières for 1917.

== Selected scientific works ==
- Ostenfeld, C.H. & Johannes Schmidt (1901) Plankton fra det Røde Hav og Adenbugten. Videnskabelige meddelelser fra Dansk Naturhistorisk Forening 1901: 141–182.
- Gelert, O. & Ostenfeld, C.H. (1902) Flora Arctica - containing description of the flowering plants and ferns, found in the Arctic regions, with their distribution in these countries, illustrated by numerous figures in the text.
  - Part 1. Pteridophyta, Gymnospermae and Monocotyledones. Copenhagen, 1902. Full text
- Ostenfeld, C.H. (1904) Weitere Beitrage zur Kenntnis der Fruchtentwicklung bei der Gattung Hieracium. Berichte der Deutschen Botanischen Gesellschaft 22:537–541
- Ostenfeld CH, Rosenberg O (1906) Experimental and cytological studies in the Hieracia. I. Castration and hybridization experiments with some species of Hieracia. Botanisk Tidsskrift 27:225–248
- Ostenfeld, C.H. (1908) On the immigration of Biddulphia sinensis Grev. and its occurrence in the North Sea during 1903-1907 and on its use for the study of the direction and rate of flow of the currents. Meddelelser fra Kommissionen for Danmarks Fiskeri- og Havundersøgelser: Serie Plankton 1 (6): 1-44.
- Ostenfeld, C.H. & C.G. Johannes Petersen (1908) On the Ecology and Distribution of the Grass-Wrack (Zostera marina) in Danish Waters. Copenhagen, Centraltrykkeriet, 62 p. Series: The Danish Biological Station vol. 16.
- Ostenfeld CH (1910) Further studies on the apogamy and hybridization of the Hieracia. Zeitschrif ind Abst und Vererb 3:241–285
- Ostenfeld, C.H. & Ove Paulsen (1910–1911) Marine plankton from the East-Greenland Sea (W. of 6° W. Long, and N. of 73° 30’ N. Lat.): collected by the Danmark Expedition 1906–1908. Meddelelser om Grønland bd. 43 (11).
  - I : List of diatoms and flagellates / by C.H. Ostenfeld. 1910
  - II : Protozoa / by C.H. Ostenfeld. 1910
  - III : Peridiniales / by Ove Paulsen. 1910
  - IV : General remarks on the microplankton / by C.H. Ostenfeld and Ove Paulsen. 1911
- Ostenfeld, C. E. H. 1912. Some remarks on the International Phytogeographic Excursion in the British Isles. New Phytologist, 11: 114–127.
- Ostenfeld, C. H. (1912) Experiments on the Origin of Species in the Genus Hieracium (Apogamy and Hybridism). New Phytologist 11 (9): 347-354.
- Ostenfeld, C. H. (1915) Plants collected during the First Thule Expedition to the northernmost Greenland. Meddelelser om Grønland, 51 (10)
- Ostenfeld, C. H. (1915) Ruppia anomala sp. nov., an Aberrant Type of the Potamogetonaceae. Bulletin of the Torrey Botanical Club 42 (12): 659-662
- Ostenfeld, C. E. H. (1916) Contributions to West Australian Botany, part I: Introduction, The sea-grasses of West Australia. Dansk Botanisk Arkiv, 2(6): 1-44
- Ostenfeld, C. E. H. (1918a) Contributions to West Australian Botany, part II: Stray notes from the tropical West Australia. Dansk Botanisk Arkiv, 2(8) : 1-29
- Ostenfeld, C. E. H. (1918b) Contributions to West Australian Botany, part II: A revision of the West Australian species of Triglochin, Crassula (Tillaea) and Frankenia. Dansk Botanisk Arkiv, 2(8) : 30-55
- Ostenfeld, C. E. H. (1921) Contributions to West Australian Botany, part III : Additions and notes to the flora of extra-tropical W. Australia. Biologiske Meddelelser, Kongelige Danske Videnskabernes Selskab, 3(2): 1-144
- Ostenfeld, C. H. (1923) Critical Notes on the Taxonomy and Nomenclature of Some Flowering Plants from Northern Greenland (II Thule Expedition 1916–1918). Meddelelser om Grønland, 64
- Ostenfeld, C. H. (1923) Flowering Plants and Ferns from Wolstenholme Sound (ca. 76°30' N. Lat.) and Two Plant Lists from Inglefield Gulf and Inglefield Land (77°28' and 79°10' N. Lat.) (II Thule Expedition 1916–1918). Meddelelser om Grønland, 64: 189-206
- Ostenfeld, C. H. (1924) The Vegetation of the North-Coast of Greenland. Based upon the late Dr. Th. Wulff's collections and observations (II Thule Expedition 1916–1918). Meddelelser om Grønland, 64: 221-268
- Ostenfeld, C.H. (1925) Vegetation of North Greenland. Botanical Gazette 80 (2): 213-218.
- Ostenfeld, C. H. (1925) Some Remarks on Species and Chromosomes. American Naturalist 59 (662): 217-218.
- Ostenfeld, C.H. (1926) The flora of Greenland and its origin. Biologiske Meddelelser, Kongelige Danske Videnskabernes Selskab, 6, 1-71
- Ostenfeld, C.H. (1931) The distribution within Denmark of the higher plants Results of the topographic-botanical investigation. 1: A brief historical survey of the investigation. Det Kongelige Danske Videnskabernes Selskabs Skrifter, Naturvidenskabelig og Mathematisk Afd., 9. Række, 3(1)
- Ostenfeld, C.H. & Johannes Grøntved (1934) The Flora of Iceland and the Færoes. Copenhagen, 1934

== Sources ==
Carl Hansen Ostenfeld in libraries (WorldCat catalog)
