= Lauritz Kolderup Rosenvinge =

Danish botanist (1858–1939)

Janus Lauritz Andreas Kolderup Rosenvinge, generally cited as Lauritz Kolderup Rosenvinge (7 November 1858 – 1939) was a Danish botanist and phycologist.

Kolderup Rosenvinge received his Ph.D. in 1888 from the University of Copenhagen. He was docent of botany at the polytechnic (Polyteknisk Læreanstalt) from 1900; and a professor of botany at the University of Copenhagen from 1916, focusing on spore plants . He undertook investigations of algae in Danish waters and in the North Atlantic.

2 types of alga genus Rosenvingea Frederik Børgesen (Børgesen) and Rosenvingiella P.C.Silva, which is a genus of green algae in the family Prasiolaceae, have been named in his honour.
