= Meddelelser om Grønland =

Danish scientific periodical

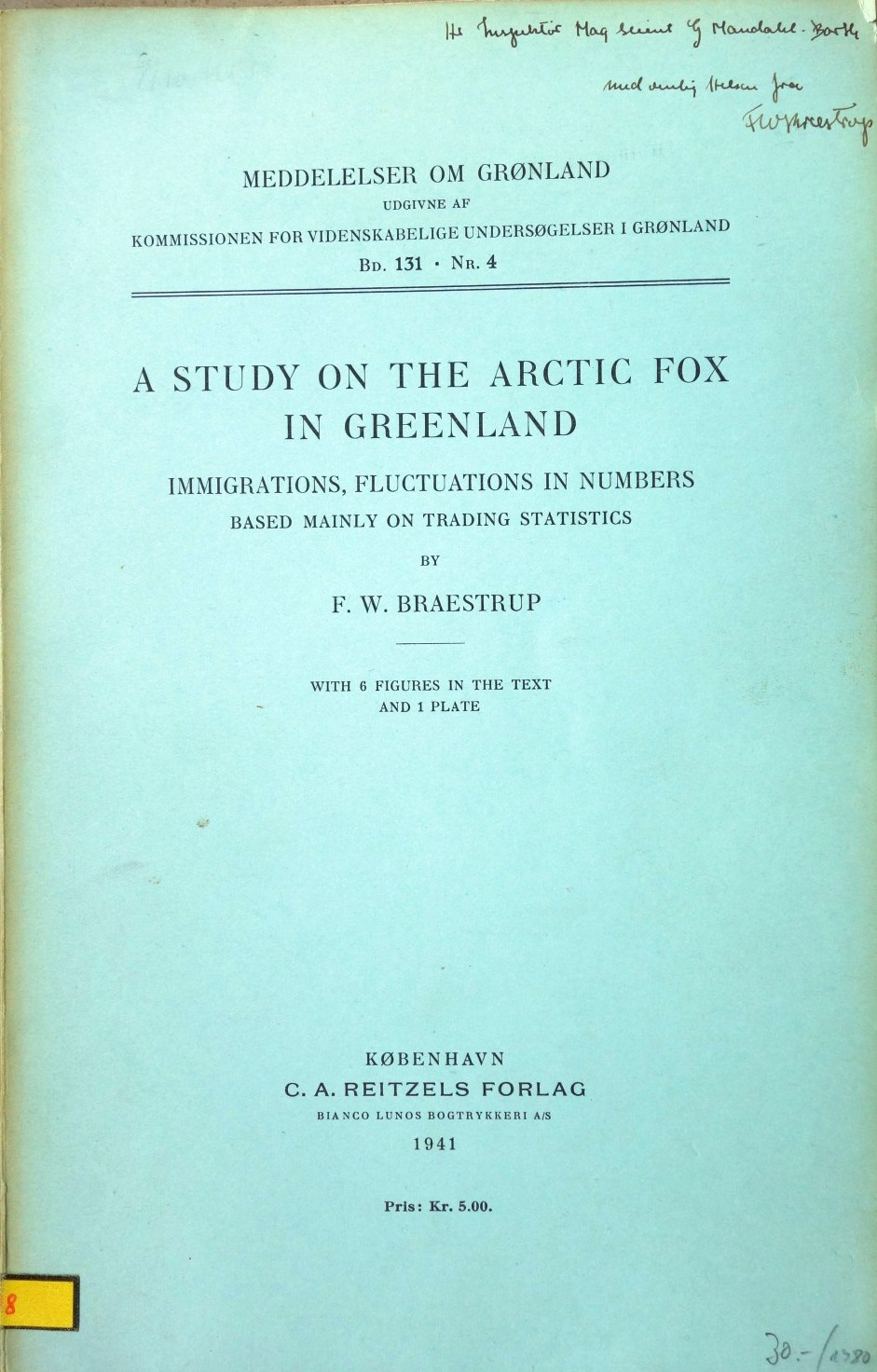
A Study on the Arctic Fox in Greenland, F. W. Braestrup, 1941

Meddelelser om Grønland ("Communications on Greenland") is a Danish scientific periodical which publishes scientific results from all fields of research on Greenland. It was established by Frederik Johnstrup and published as a single series by the Commission for Scientific Investigations in Greenland from 1878 to 1979, with contributions in Danish, German, English or French.

In 1979, following the issue of vol. 206, the series was split up into three individually numbered subseries, all published in English: Bioscience, Geoscience, and Man & Society. When publication of the series was handed over to Museum Tusculanum Press in 2008, the original name was revived, now with the official English title Monographs on Greenland, and the volumes which had appeared between 1979 and 2008 were retroactively numbered in the revived main series (nos. 207–345). As of vol. 346, all publications carry dual numbering.
