= Tourism in Greenland =

Tourism is a relatively young business sector of Greenland. Since the foundation of the national tourist council, Greenland Tourism, in 1992, the Home Rule Government (renamed 'Self Rule Government' in 2009) has been working actively with promoting the destination and helping smaller tourist providers to establish their services. Foreign travel agencies have increasingly been opening up sale of Greenland trips and tours, and the cruise industry has had a relatively large increase in routes to (or passing) Greenland since about the turn of the century.

The country has spectacular scenery and a few historic sites. The everyday life and local culture of Greenlanders is one of the main experiences for adventure travellers to Greenland.

The main tourist activities on offer are sailing tours among icebergs, dog sledding tours, ice cap treks, wildlife spotting (including whale watching), iceberg watching, and hiking trips to the mainly Norse ruins.

== Visit Greenland ==
Visit Greenland is the Greenland Self-Rule Government agency responsible for tourism in Greenland. The head office is in Nuuk, Greenland. There is a subsidiary office in Copenhagen, Denmark.

Visit Greenland was established in 1992. Its original goal was to develop a sustainable tourism industry and market Greenland as a tourism destination. The role was subsequently expanded to include the development of industry and small businesses in Greenland. Visit Greenland in Nuuk focuses on facilitation and the Copenhagen office focuses on marketing. Visit Greenland has a collaboration with the Danish travel agency Greenland Travel, which is currently the largest tour operator and travel agency specializing in travels to Greenland.

== Statistics ==
Most overnight visitors (non-Greenlandic) arriving to Greenland in 2016 were from the following countries of nationality:

Rank	Country	Number
1	Denmark	19,275
2	United States	2,767
3	Germany	2,440
4	Sweden	2,352
5	United Kingdom	1,595
6	Iceland	1,166
7	Norway	1,125
8	France	748
9	Canada	716
10	Japan	583

== Greenland Self-Rule Government ==
In 2002 Greenland (then "Home Rule Government" now "Self-Rule Government") established five focus regions for the development of the tourism industry in Greenland. "Destination North Greenland" centered on Disko Bay, "Destination Arctic Circle" centered on Kangerlussuaq, "Destination Capital Region" centered on the capital Nuuk, "Destination South Greenland" centered on Qaqortoq, and "Destination East Greenland" in East Greenland with Tasiilaq as the main hub.

The most popular tourist destination is Ilulissat Icefjord, which was declared a UNESCO World Heritage Site in 2004.

== Effects of the COVID-19 pandemic ==
Tourism increased significantly between 2015 and 2019, with the number of visitors increasing from 77,000 per year to 105,000. One source estimated that in 2019 the revenue from this aspect of the economy was about 450 million kroner (US$67 million). Like many aspects of the economy, this slowed dramatically in 2020, and into 2021, due to restrictions required as a result of the COVID-19 pandemic; one source describes tourism as being the "biggest economic victim of the coronavirus". (The overall economy did not suffer too severely as of mid 2020, thanks to the fisheries "and a hefty subsidy from Copenhagen".) Tourism is expected to recover in 2021, and Greenland's goal is to develop it "right" and to "build a more sustainable tourism for the long run".

== Donald Trump's second presidency ==
Greenland experienced a surge in tourism following renewed global attention from U.S. President Donald Trump during his second term. In early 2025, Trump’s comments and his son Donald Trump Jr.'s visit to the newly opened Nuuk international airport drew international focus. Tour operators, such as Ivik Knudsen-Ostermann of Greenland Cruises, reported a significant rise in bookings. The tourism boom aligns with Greenland’s efforts to diversify its economy beyond fishing, leveraging its glaciers, fjords, and Inuit culture. Meanwhile, Trump reaffirmed his interest in acquiring the island, citing its rare earth mineral resources.

== Points of interest ==
=== Ilulissat ===
- Ilulissat Icefjord - Fjord south of the city declared UNESCO World Heritage Site in 2004
- Jakobshavn Glacier - The most productive glacier in the northern hemisphere
- Sermermiut - An abandoned Inuit settlement in the UNESCO World Heritage Site
- Ilimanaq - A small settlement, former whaling station south of the Icefjord
- Oqaatsut - A small settlement, current whaling station north of Ilulissat
- Knud Rasmussen's Museum - Museum dedicated to the Greenlandic–Danish polar explorer Knud Rasmussen
- Zions Church

=== Nuuk ===
- Greenland National Museum
- Kangeq: abandoned fishing village
- Nuuk Art Museum
- Nuuk Cathedral

=== South Greenland ===
- Narsarsuaq Museum - displays on the Vikings, sheep farming, and the American presence in Southern Greenland
- Iceview Plateau Hike - a 5-6 hour hike from Narsaruaq that leads to a high plateau with a lake
- Hvalsey Church, a ruin built by the vikings around 12th century
- Qaqortoq Museum - main museum of Qaqortoq
