= Jakobshavn Glacier =

Glacier in Greenland

- Jakobshavn Isbræ (Danish); Sermeq Kujalleq (Greenlandic)
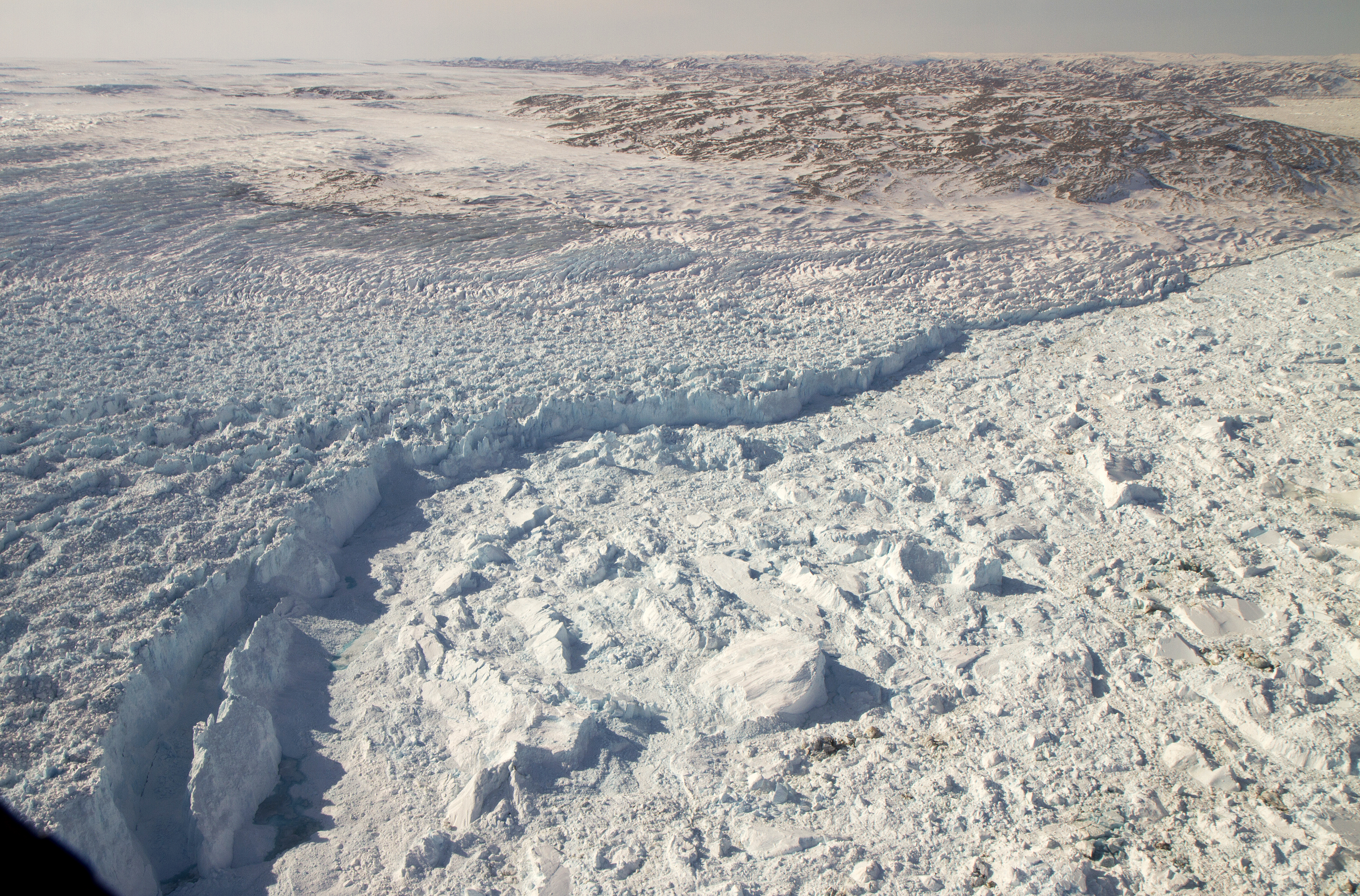
- The calving front of the glacier

- Location within Greenland
- Type: Ice stream
- Location: Near Ilulissat, Greenland
- Coordinates: 69°10′N 49°50′W
- Area: 110 000 km^{2} (whole catchment)
- Length: greater than 65 km
- Thickness: around 2000 m
- Terminus: Ocean (was floating now grounded)
- Status: Advancing

UNESCO World Heritage Site
- Official name: Ilulissat Icefjord
- Type: Natural
- Criteria: vii, viii
- Designated: 2004
- Reference no.: 1149

Jakobshavn Glacier (Danish: Jakobshavn Isbræ), also known as Ilulissat Glacier (Greenlandic: Sermeq Kujalleq), is a large outlet glacier in West Greenland. It is located near the Greenlandic town of Ilulissat (colonial name in Danish: Jakobshavn) and ends at the sea in the Ilulissat Icefjord.

Jakobshavn Glacier drains 6.5% of the Greenland ice sheet and produces around 10% of all Greenland icebergs. Some 35 billion tonnes of icebergs calve off and pass out of the fjord every year. Icebergs breaking from the glacier are often so large (up to 1 km in height) that they are too tall to float down the fjord and lie stuck on the bottom of its shallower areas, sometimes for years, until they are broken up by the force of the glacier and icebergs further up the fjord.

Studied for over 250 years, the Jakobshavn Glacier has helped develop modern understanding of climate change and icecap glaciology. Jakobshavn is one of the fastest-declining glaciers in the world, and icebergs calving from Jakobshavn were responsible for 4 percent of the increase in global sea level in the 20th century. Ilulissat Icefjord (Greenlandic: Ilulissat Kangerlua) was declared a UNESCO World Heritage Site in 2004, in part because of the importance of the Jakobshavn Glacier in contributing to the current scientific understanding of climate change.

== Name ==
Jakobshavn has been a name used for this glacier in scientific literature since 1853 when Danish geologist Hinrich Johannes Rink referred to it as Jakobshavn Isstrøm (Danish for Jakobshavn Ice Stream). It is sometimes referred to in the international scientific literature (by glaciologists) as Jakobshavn Isbræ glacier. Isbræ is Danish for glacier. It is also commonly known by the anglicised version, Jakobshavn Glacier.

The local name for this glacier is Sermeq Kujalleq, where "sermeq" is Greenlandic for 'glacier' and "kujalleq" means 'southern'. It lies south of the town Ilulissat (colonial name Jakobshavn). UNESCO's World Heritage Site website uses this name, in connection with mention of the Ilulissat Icefjord world heritage site, which includes the downstream end of the glacier.

There is evidence that people have inhabited the area around the glacier for up to 4000 years. The recently abandoned settlement of Sermermiut (which means 'place of the glacier people') lies just to the north of the glacier, much nearer than Ilulissat.

The glacier is sometimes referred to as Ilulissat Glacier. This form simply replaces Jakobshavn with Ilulissat because of the change in the name of the town.

== Acceleration and retreat ==
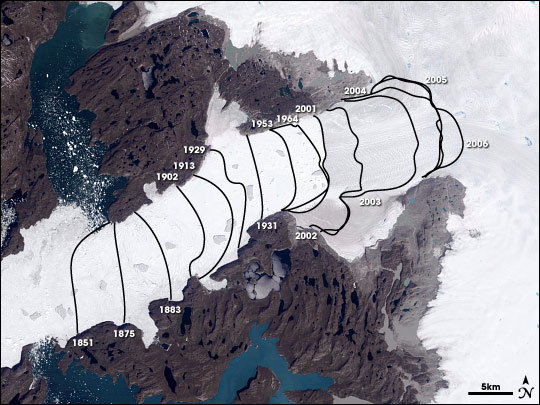
Landsat image of Jakobshavn Glacier. The lines show the position of the calving front of the Jakobshavn Glacier since 1851. The date of this image is 2006 and the calving front of the glacier can be seen at the 2006 line. The area stretching from the calving front to the sea (towards the bottom left corner) is the Ilulissat icefjord. Courtesy of NASA Earth Observatory

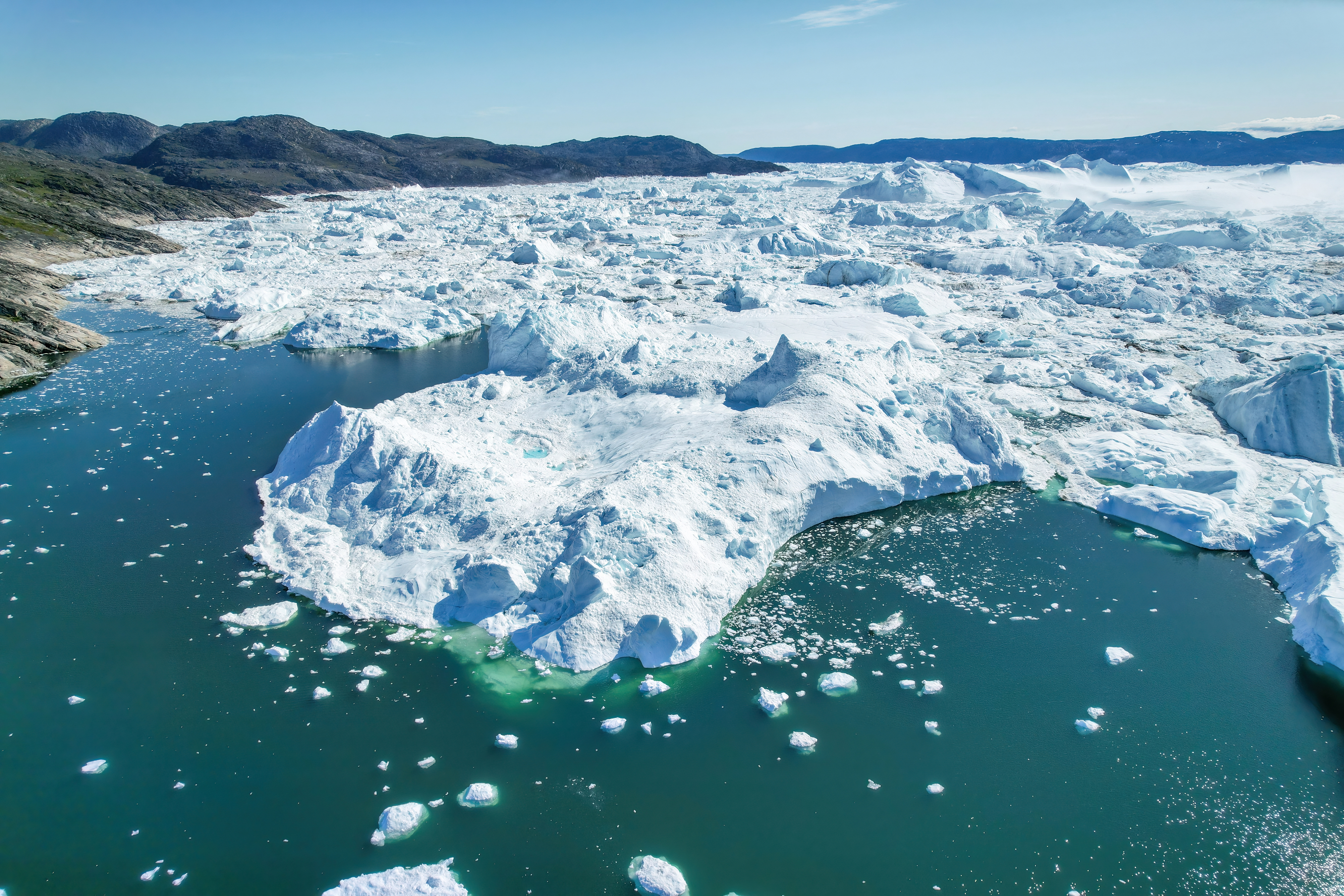
Aerial view of Jakobshavn Glacier from west side

Jakobshavn is one of the fastest moving glaciers, flowing at its terminus at speeds that used to be around 20 metres (66 ft) per day but are over 45 metres (150 ft) per day when averaged annually, with summer speeds even higher (as measured 2012–2013). The speed of Jakobshavn Glacier varied between 5,700 and 12,600 metres (18,700 and 41,300 ft) per year between 1992 and 2003. The ice stream's speed-up and near-doubling of ice flow from land into the ocean has increased the rate of sea level rise by about 0.06 millimetres (0.0024 in) per year, or roughly 4 percent of the 20th century rate of sea level rise. Jakobshavn Isbrae retreated 30 km (19 mi) from 1850 to 1964, followed by a stationary front for 35 years. Jakobshavn has the highest mass flux of any glacier draining the Greenland Ice Sheet. The glacier terminus region also had a consistent velocity of 20 metres (66 ft) per day (maximum of 26 metres (85 ft) per day in the glacier center), from season to season and year to year, the glacier seemed to be in balance from 1955 to 1985. The position of this terminus fluctuated by 2.5 km (1.6 mi) around its annual mean position between 1950 and 1996. After 1997 the glacier began to accelerate and thin rapidly, reaching an average velocity of 34 metres (112 ft) per day in the terminus region. On Jakobshavn, the acceleration began at the calving front and spread up-glacier 20 km (12 mi) in 1997 and up to 55 km (34 mi) inland by 2003. In 2012 a significant acceleration of Jakobshavn was observed, with summer speeds up to 4 times its speed in the 1990s, and average annual speeds of 3 times its 1990s speed. Movement reached more than 17,000 metres per year. Jakobshavn has afterwards slowed to near its pre-1997 speed, with the terminus retreat still occurring until 2015. In 2016, researchers found the water temperatures in its fjord had dropped to levels as cool as those in the 1980s. Airborne altimetry and satellite imagery show that until early 2019, this temperature drop likely caused the glacier to re-advance, slow down, and thicken (by over 100 feet from 2016 to 2018).

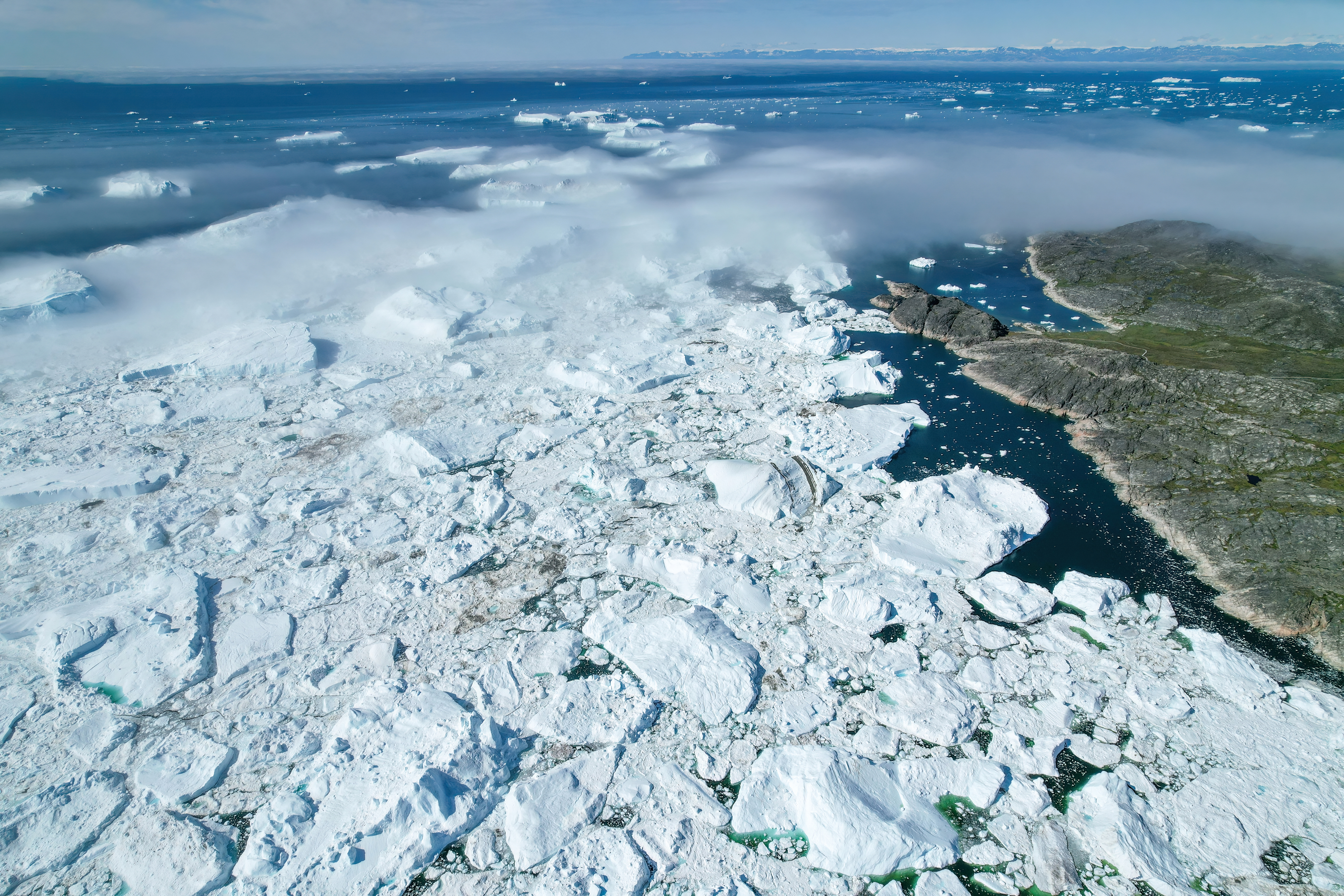
Aerial view of Jakobshavn Glacier looking to west side

Large calving events where the glacier produces icebergs have also been found to trigger earthquakes due to ice-ice and ice-bottom of the fjord interactions. and from the longer-duration forces exerted on the solid Earth during the capsize of very large (e.g., > 1 km^{3}) calved ice volumes. Especially large calving events at Jakobshavn have produced glacial earthquakes that are detectable on seismographs worldwide with moment magnitudes in excess of 5.0. A large calving of approximately 7 km^{2} took place on 15 February 2015. On 16 August 2015 a calving was identified via satellite images as the largest ever recorded at Jakobshavn, with an area of 12.5 km^{2}.

=== Mechanisms ===
The first mechanism for explaining the change in velocity is the "Zwally effect" and is not the main mechanism, this relies on meltwater reaching the glacier base and reducing the friction through a higher basal water pressure. A moulin is the conduit for the additional meltwater to reach the glacier base. This idea, proposed by Jay Zwally, was observed to be the cause of a brief seasonal acceleration of up to 20% on the Jakobshavns Glacier in 1998 and 1999 at Swiss Camp. The acceleration lasted 2–3 months and was less than 10% in 1996 and 1997 for example. They offered a conclusion that the "coupling between surface melting and ice-sheet flow provides a mechanism for rapid, large-scale, dynamic responses of ice sheets to climate warming". The acceleration of the three glaciers had not occurred at the time of this study and they were not concluding or implying that the meltwater increase was the cause of the aforementioned acceleration. Examination of rapid supra-glacial lake drainage documented short term velocity changes due to such events, but they had little significance to the annual flow of the large outlet glaciers.

The second mechanism is a "Jakobshavn effect", coined by Terry Hughes, where a small imbalance of forces caused by some perturbation can cause a substantial non-linear response. In this case an imbalance of forces at the calving front propagates up-glacier. Thinning causes the glacier to be more buoyant, even becoming afloat at the calving front, and is responsive to tidal changes. The reduced friction due to greater buoyancy allows for an increase in velocity. The reduced resistive force at the calving front is then propagated up glacier via longitudinal extension in what R. Thomas calls a backforce reduction.

This mechanism is supported by the data indicating no significant seasonal velocity changes at the calving front and the acceleration propagating upglacier from the calving front. The cause of the thinning could be a combination of increased surface ablation and basal ablation as one report presents data that show a sudden increase in subsurface ocean temperature in 1997 along the entire west coast of Greenland, and suggests that the changes in Jakobshavn Glacier are due to the arrival of relatively warm water originating from the Irminger Sea near Iceland.

Evidence also exists for a deep subglacial trench beneath the glacial outlet, identified through seismic reflection methods:

"A deep U-shaped subglacial trough was found beneath the entire length of the well-defined ice stream. The trough is incised up to 1500 m into bedrock, and its base lies 1200–1500 m below sea level for at least 70 km inland."

There are theories that Greenland consists of three large islands under the ice sheet, separated at the coast by three narrow straits, one of them Jakobshavn Glacier.

== Chasing Ice ==
In the 2012 documentary entitled Chasing Ice by cinematographer Jeff Orlowski, nature photographer James Balog and his Extreme Ice Survey (EIS) team, there is a 75-minute segment showing the Jakobshavn Glacier calving. Two EIS videographers waited several weeks in a small tent overlooking the glacier, and were finally able to witness 7.4 cubic kilometres (1.8 cu mi) of ice crashing off the glacier. It was the longest calving ever captured on film.

== See also ==
- Glacier mass balance
- Glacial motion
- List of glaciers in Greenland
- Retreat of glaciers since 1850
- West Greenland Current
