= Ricky Enø Jørgensen =

Danish cyclist

Personal information
- Full name: Ricky Enø Jørgensen
- Born: 5 June 1989 (age 37) Ilulissat, Greenland, Kingdom of Denmark

Cycling career
- Sport: Cycling
- Current team: Designa Køkken-Knudsgaard
- Disciplines: Road and MTB
- Role: Rider

Professional teams
- 2008: Designa Køkken
- 2009–2010: Glud & Marstrand–Horsens
- 2011: Concordia Forsikring–Himmerland
- 2012–: Designa Køkken-Knudsgaard

Ricky Enø Jørgensen (born 5 June 1989) is a Danish racing cyclist for Designa Køkken-Knudsgaard. Enø Jørgensen was born in Ilulissat, Greenland, Kingdom of Denmark.
