= Blue iceberg =

Iceberg with a blue colour, often due to very low air content

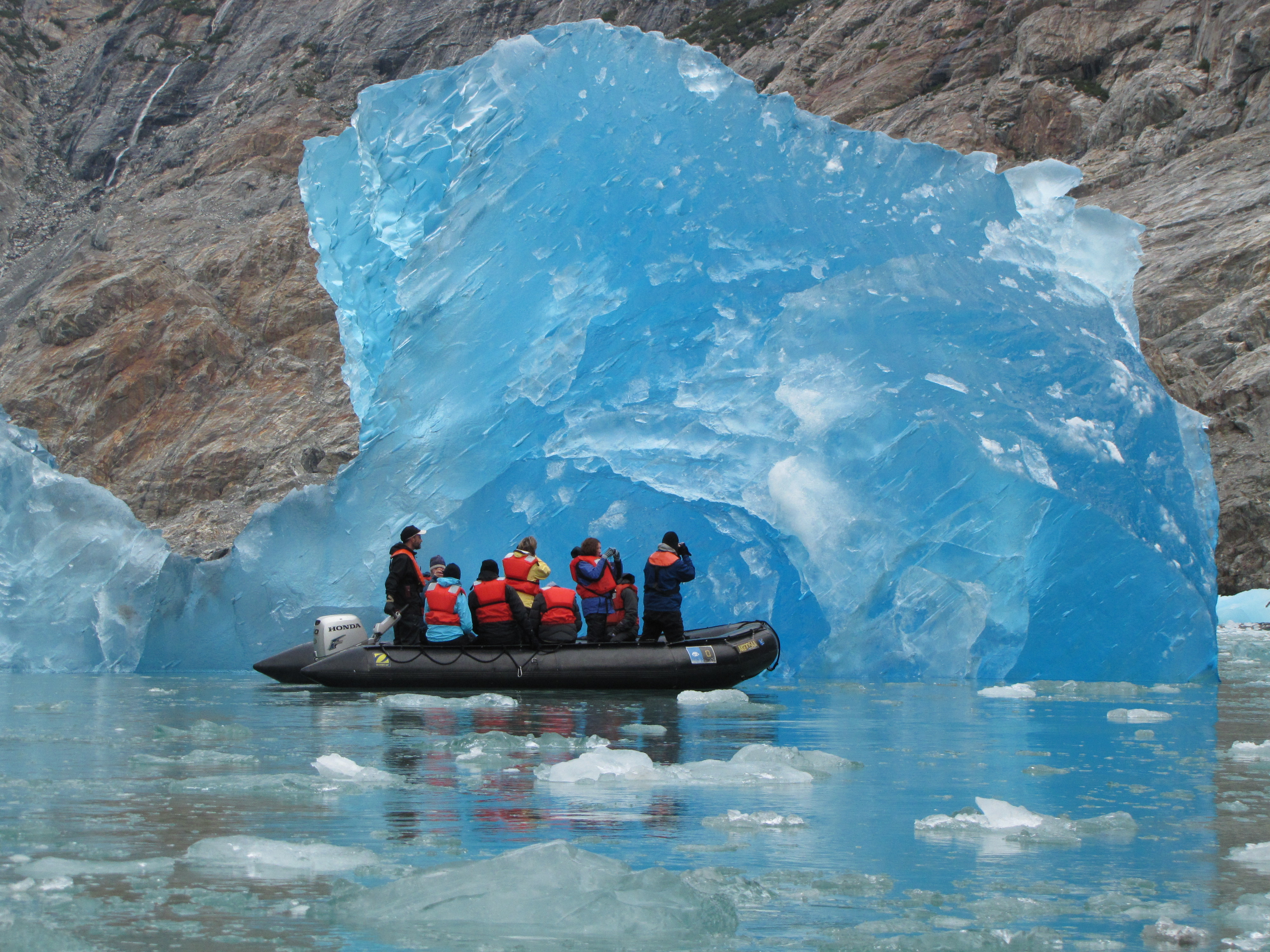
Blue iceberg observed by tourists along the coast of Alaska, 2010

A blue iceberg is visible after the ice from above the water melts, causing the smooth portion of ice from below the water to overturn. The rare blue ice is formed from the compression of pure snow, which then develops into glacial ice.

Icebergs may also appear blue due to light refraction and age. Older icebergs reveal vivid hues of green and blue, resulting from a high concentration of color, microorganisms, and compacted ice. An iceberg of “electric blue” colour in the waters off Sermilik fjord near Greenland in 2009 was named by locals the "blue diamond".

== Physics of light and color ==
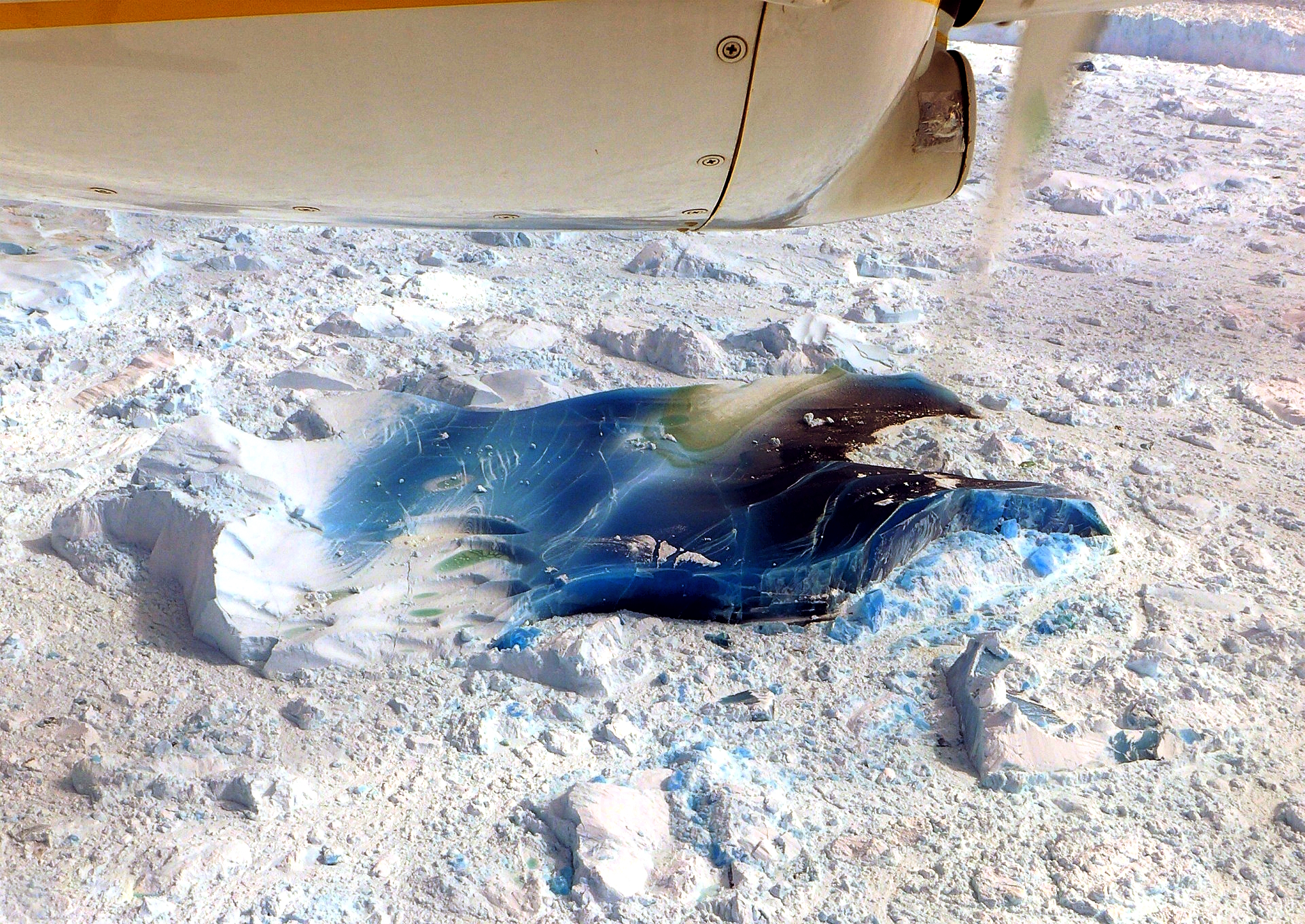
Blue iceberg seen in the Ilulissat Icefjord, 2015

=== White icebergs ===
Commonly seen white icebergs generally derive their color from the snow and frost remaining on the surface which results in the uniform reflection of incident light. Young glaciers that have not undergone years of compression, may also appear white. Due to the age of the iceberg, there remains a tremendous amount of air and reflective surfaces. The iceberg easily reflects the sun as white light.

=== Preferential light absorption and age ===
Blue icebergs develop from older, deep glaciers which have undergone tremendous pressure experienced for hundreds of years. The process releases and eliminates air that was originally caught in the ice by falling snow. Therefore, icebergs that have been formed from older glaciers have little internal air or reflective surfaces. When long wavelength light (i.e. red) from the sun hits the iceberg, it is absorbed rather than reflected. The light transmitted or refracted through the ice returns as blue or blue-green. Older glaciers also reflect incident light preferentially at the short wavelength end of the spectrum (i.e. blue) due to Rayleigh scattering, much in the same way that makes the sky blue.

=== Color spectrum and water ===
Light is absorbed and reflected in water. Visible white light is made up of a spectrum of colors from the rainbow, ranging from red to violet. As the light travels through the water, the waves of light from the red end of the spectrum dissipate (i.e. are absorbed), while those from the blue end, become more prominent.

Underwater divers have direct experience of these effects. Above the water, all the colors remain visible. As the diver swims deeper under water, the colors begin to disappear, starting with red. At an approximate depth of 30 feet (9.1 m), red is no longer visible to the naked eye. At 75 feet (23 m), yellow looks greenish-blue, because the water has absorbed the yellow light. Finally, all that remains visible to the naked eye, appears as a mutation of blue or green, while the water above the surface filters out the sunlight. As the diver swims deeper into the ocean, he finds that the blue colors start to disappear, to the point where the underwater world deep below the surface, becomes completely black, devoid of any color at all.

== RMS Titanic ==
Since 1912, reports made by witnesses of the RMS Titanic tragedy have stated that the ship hit a blue iceberg. Following the sinking and subsequent discovery of the Titanic, scientific research and forensic analysis have reconstructed the tragedy to ascertain the reliability of the statements made by the survivors. Reports released in the last decade of the 20th century have shown that a blue iceberg in the north Atlantic would have been easily detected. Alternative theories suggest that pack ice, rather than a blue iceberg, was responsible for sinking the ship.
