= Ilulissat =

City in Greenland

Ilulissat Jakobshavn
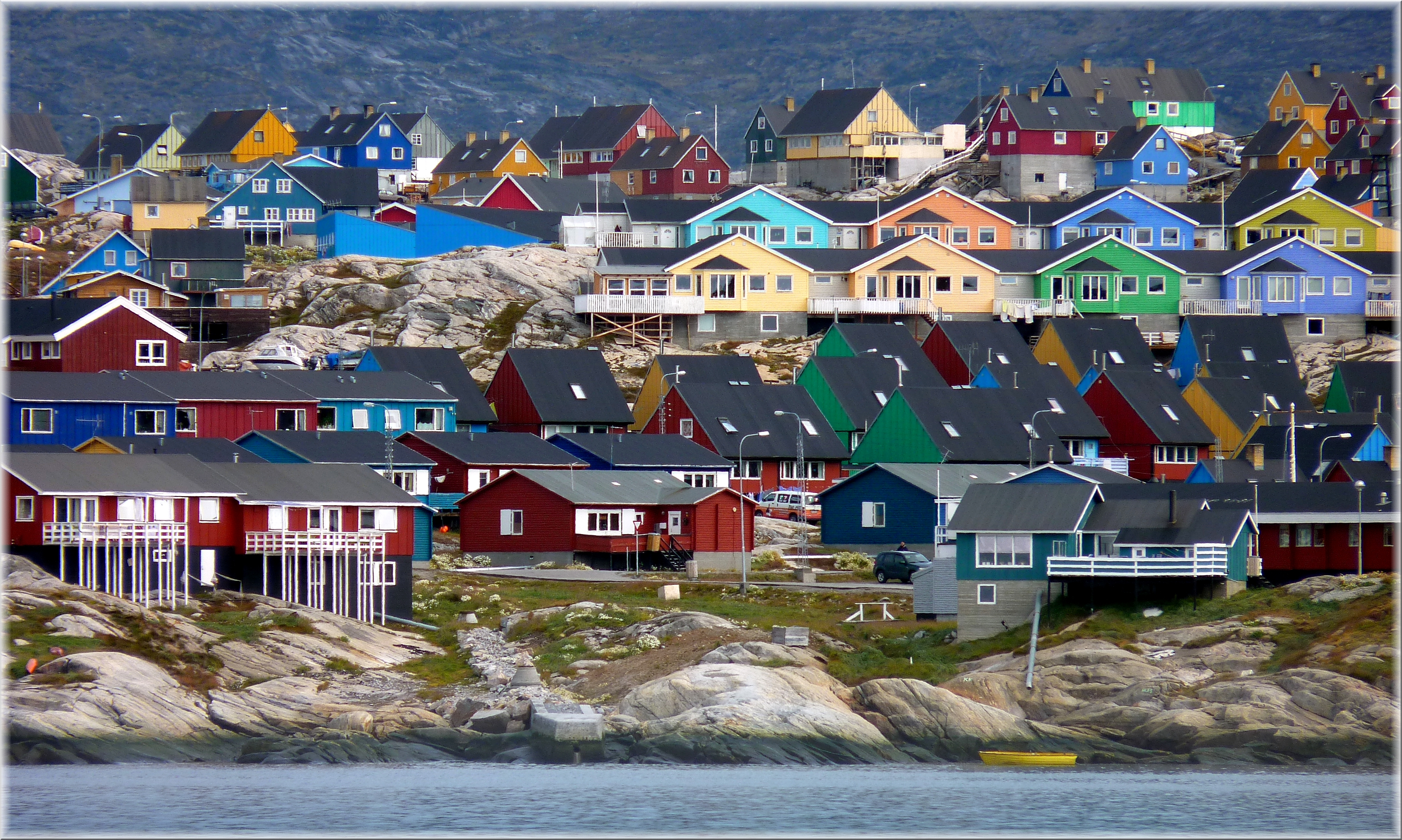
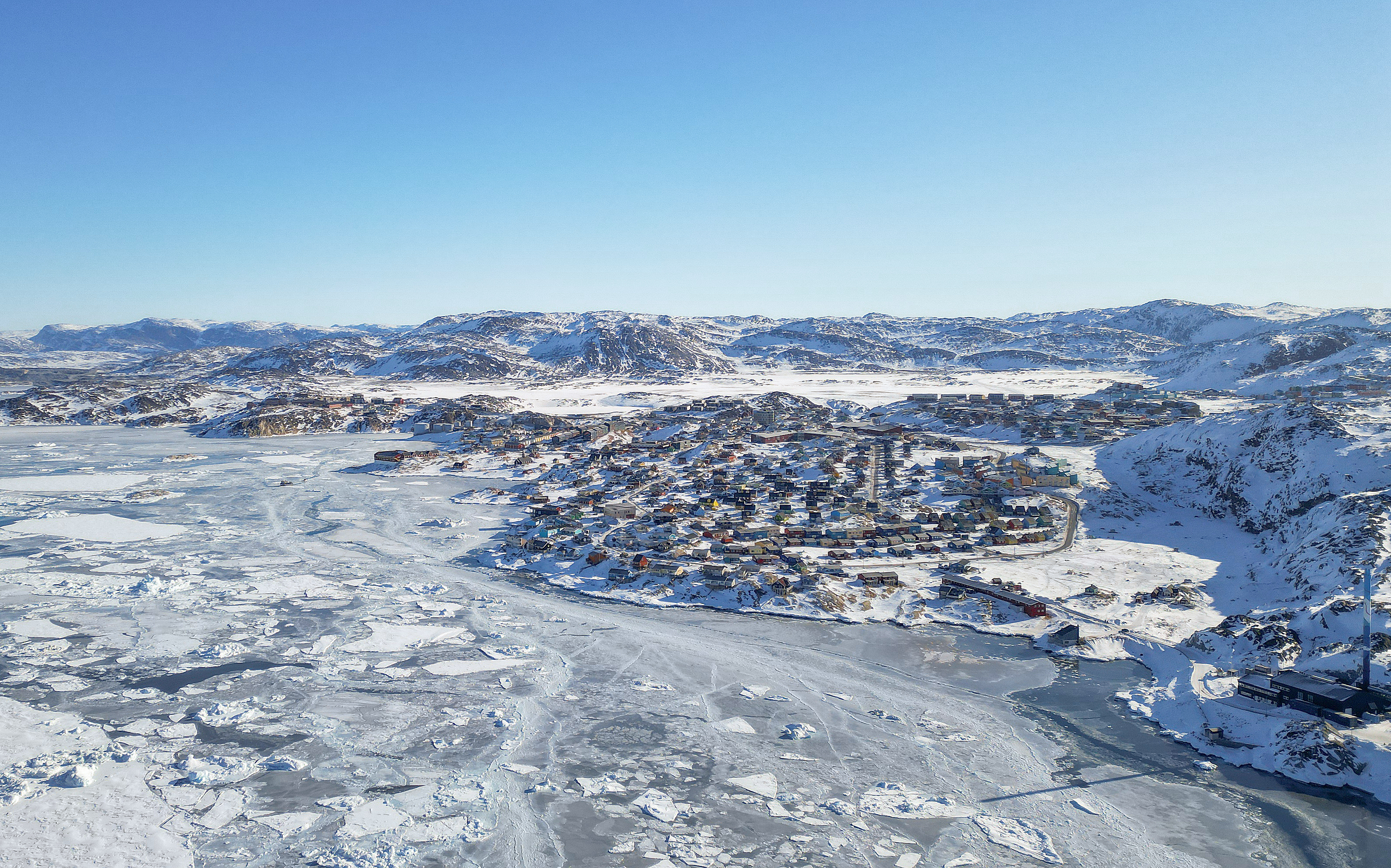
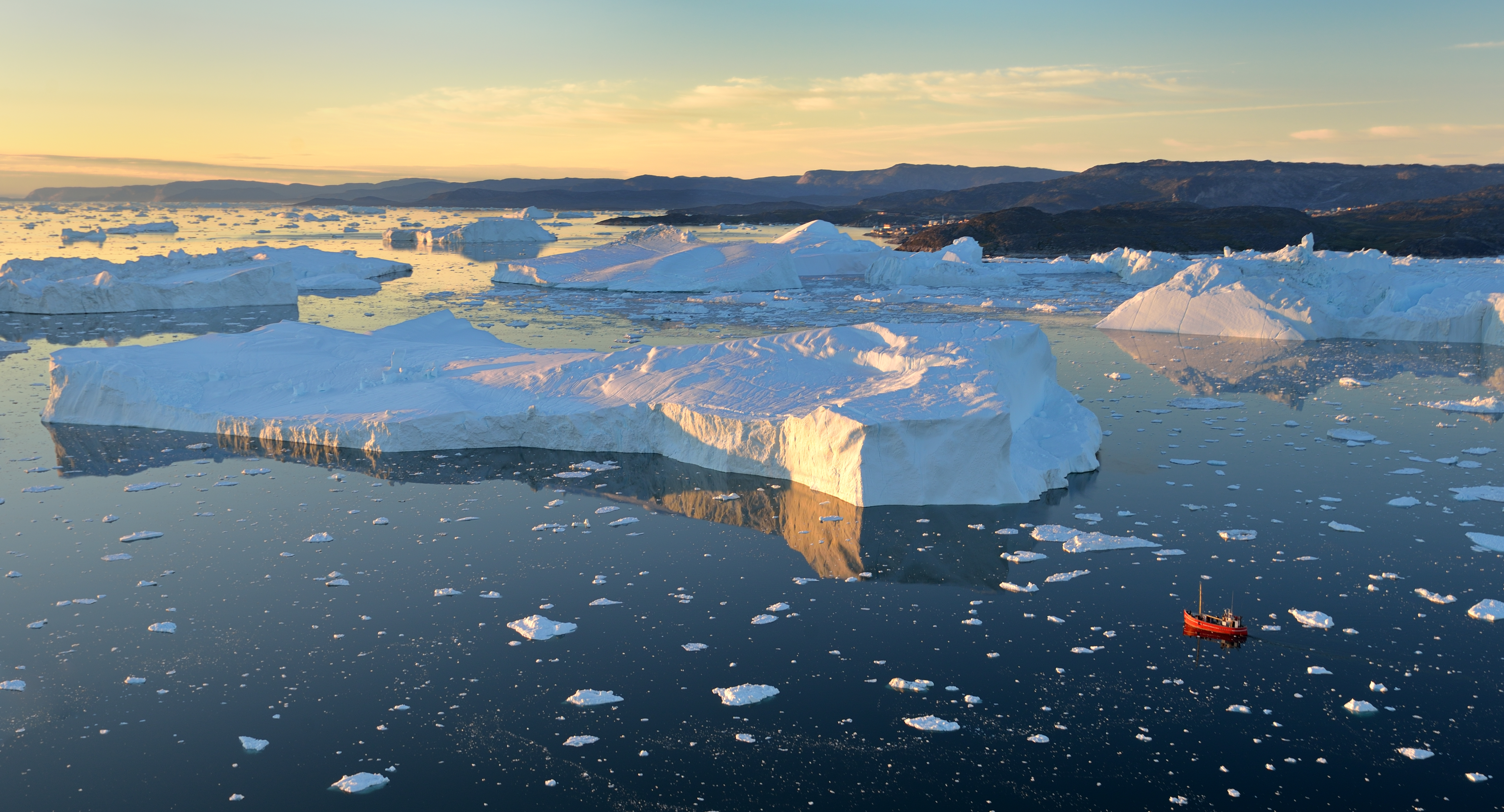
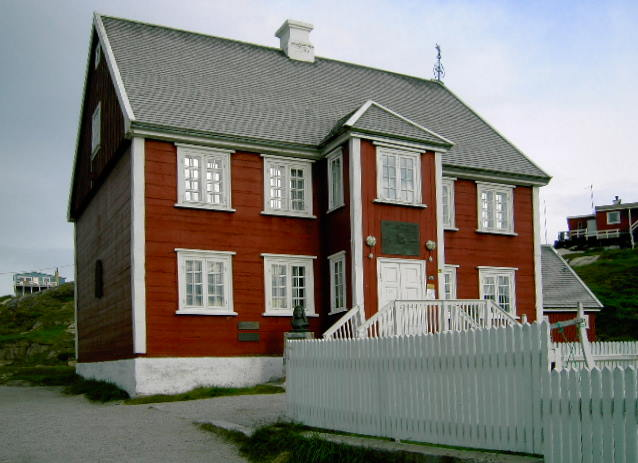
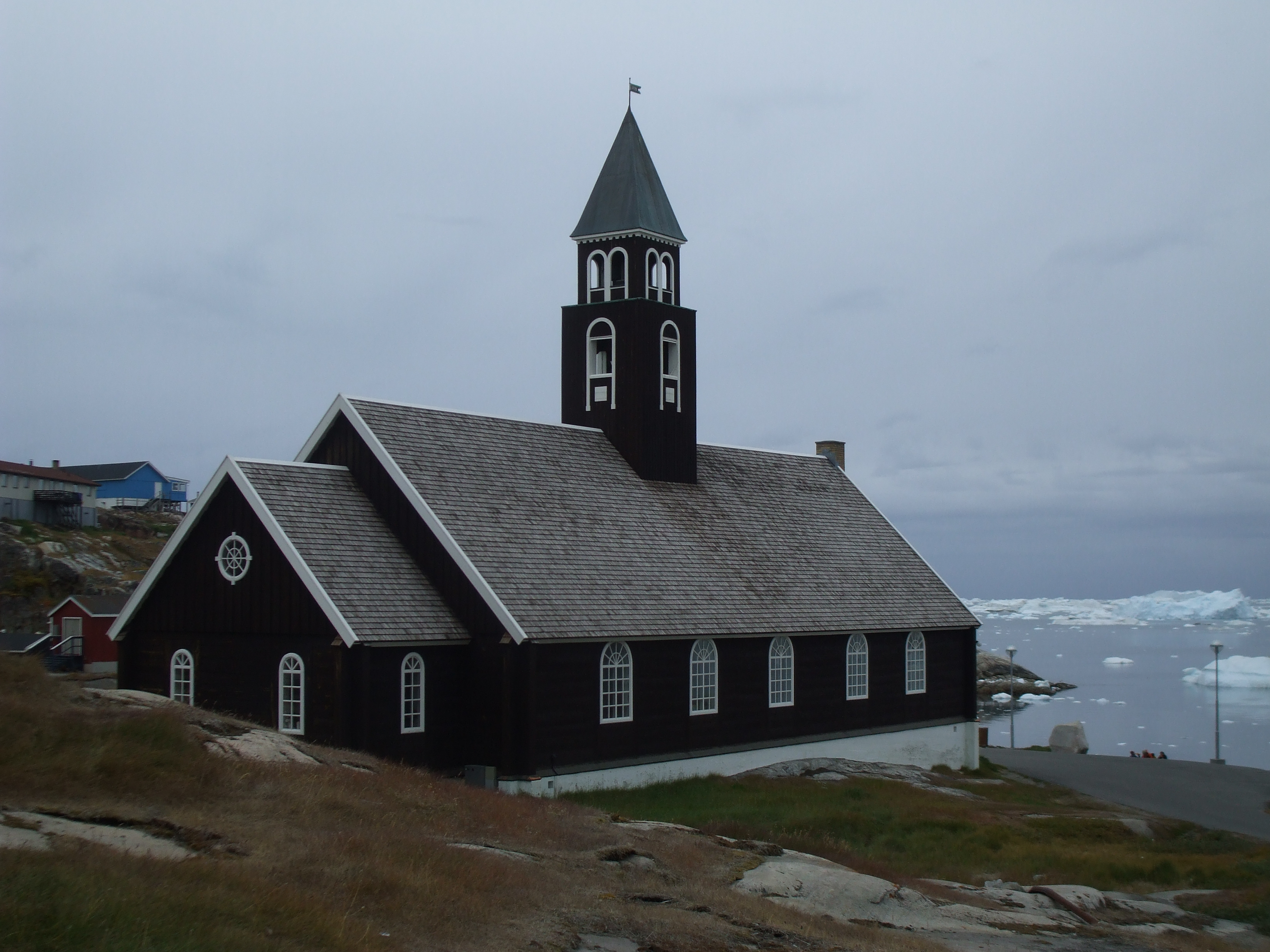
- From upper left: Illumiut neighbourhood, Aerial view, Ilulissat Icefjord, Knud Rasmussen's Museum, Zion's Church

- Flag Coat of arms

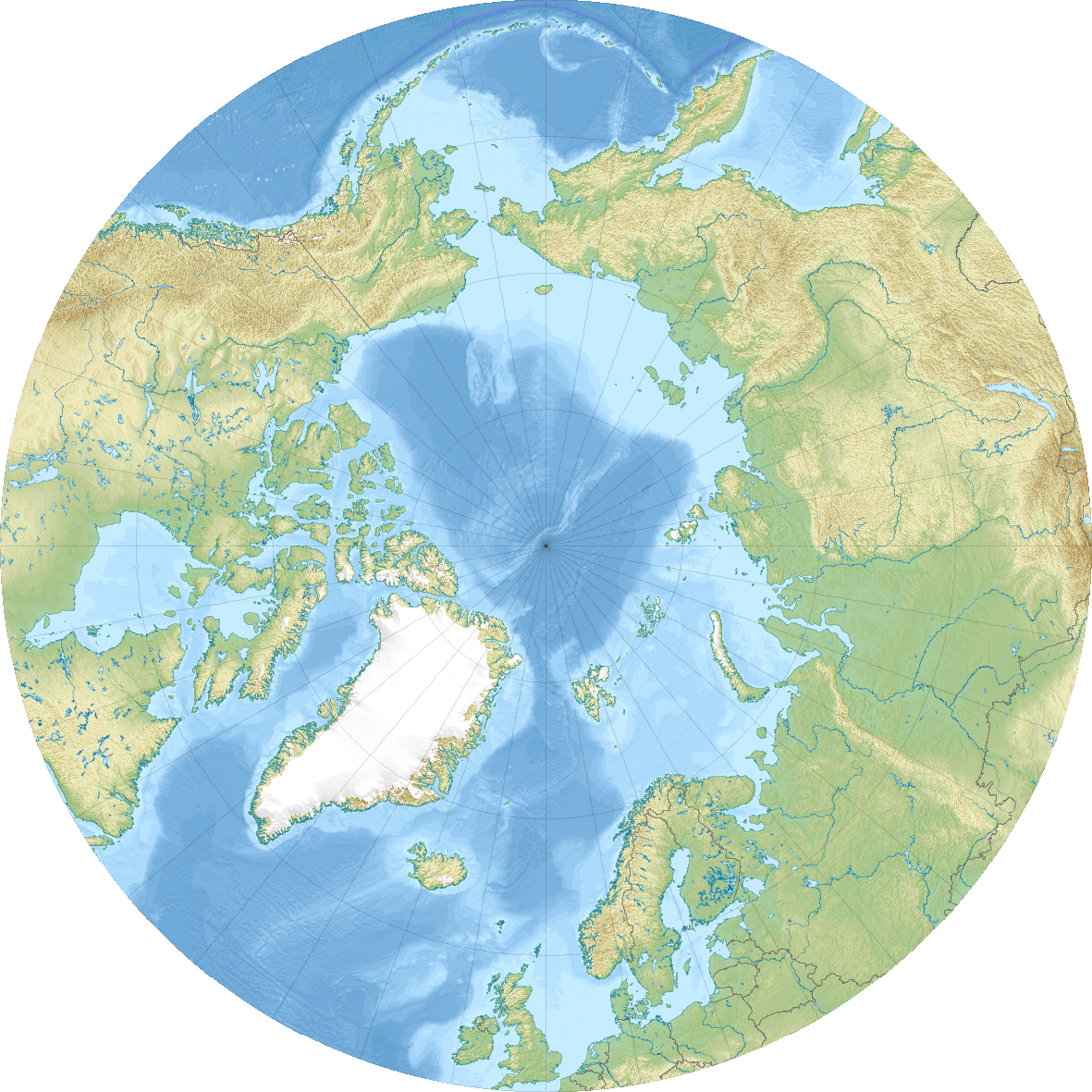
- Location within Greenland Ilulissat (North Atlantic) Ilulissat (Arctic)
- Coordinates: 69°13′11″N 51°05′55″W
- Sovereign state: Kingdom of Denmark
- Autonomous territory: Greenland
- Municipality: Avannaata
- First mention: 15th century
- City Status: 1741

Area
  - City: 11.25 km^{2} (4.34 sq mi)
  - Metro: 47.00 km^{2} (18.15 sq mi)
- Highest elevation: 2,010 m (6,590 ft)
- Lowest elevation: 1 m (3.3 ft)

Population (2025)
  - City: 5,149
  - Density: 457.7/km^{2} (1,185/sq mi)
  - Metro density: 103.5/km^{2} (268/sq mi)
  - Ethnicity: 90.98% Greenlandic; 9.02% Other
- Time zone: UTC−02:00 (Western Greenland Time)
  - Summer (DST): UTC−01:00 (Western Greenland Summer Time)
- Postal code: 3952
- Area code: (+299) 94

Ilulissat (lit. 'Icebergs'), also known as Jakobshavn or Jacobshavn, is the municipal seat and largest town of the Avannaata municipality in western Greenland, located approximately 350 km (220 mi) north of the Arctic Circle. With a population of 5,149 as of 2025, it is the third-largest city in Greenland, after Nuuk and Sisimiut. The city is home to almost as many sled-dogs as people.

The nearby Ilulissat Icefjord is a UNESCO World Heritage Site, and has made Ilulissat the most popular tourist destination in Greenland. Tourism is now the town's principal industry. The city neighbours the Ilulissat Icefjord, where there are enormous icebergs from the most productive glacier in the northern hemisphere.

== History ==
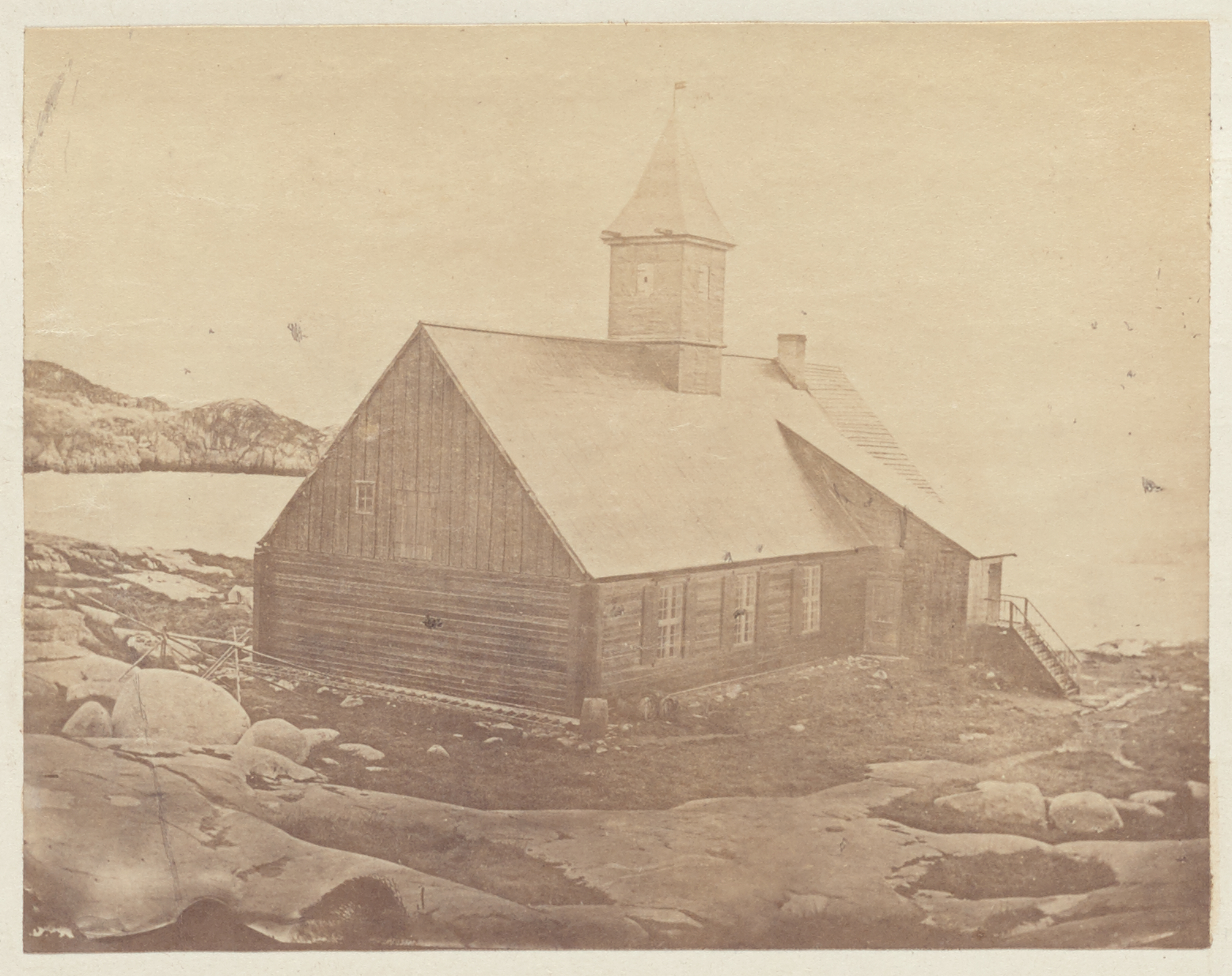
The Lutheran church, photographed in 1869

Archaeological finds at Semermiut, near Ilulissat, show that the area was inhabited by Inuit peoples from prehistoric times, with evidence of Saqqaq settlement around 1500 BC and Dorset occupation from about 300 AD. In the 17th and 18th centuries, Dutch whalers traded extensively with the local population and referred to the area as Maklykout, a name now thought to be a corruption of the Greenlandic magdliukait ("tidal wave").

The town was established as a trading post by Jacob Severin's company in 1741; it was named in his honor after the Battle of Jacobshavn, in which Danish forces defeated the Dutch whalers.

The Zion Church (Zions Kirke) was built in the late 18th century; it was the largest man-made structure in Greenland at the time. The final resident of nearby Sermermiut moved to Ilulissat in 1850.

=== Ilulissat Declaration ===
The town was the site of the Arctic Ocean Conference in May 2008. The joint meeting between Canada, Denmark, Norway, Russia, and the United States was held to discuss key issues relating to territorial claims in the Arctic (particularly Hans Island — eventually settled in 2022 — and Arktika 2007) and Arctic shrinkage produced by climate change.

The Ilulissat Declaration arose from the conference. It stated that the law of the sea provided for important rights and obligations concerning the delineation of the outer limits of the continental shelf, the protection of the marine environment (including ice-covered areas), freedom of navigation, marine scientific research, and other uses of the sea. It also said that it remained committed to this legal framework and to the orderly settlement of any possible overlapping claims.

With this existing legal framework providing a solid foundation for responsible management, there was no need to develop a new comprehensive international legal regime to govern the Arctic Ocean. The states involved would continue the developments within the Arctic Ocean and continue to implement appropriate measures to further said developments.

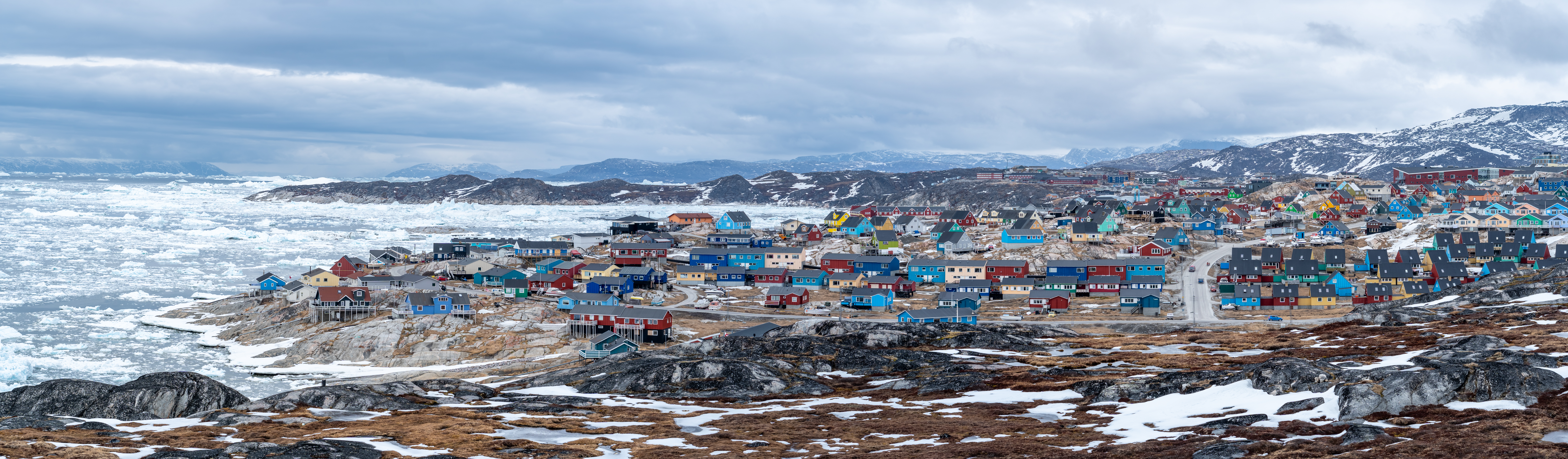
A panoramic view of Ilulissat in 2024

=== Hotel Ilulissat fire ===
On 7 March 2021 at 20.12 (local time), a major fire broke out in Hotel Ilulissat, which at the time was still under construction. The fire and smoke was seen throughout the city. Police asked everyone in the area to stay home and keep their windows closed, until the fire fighters put out the fire. The police in Nuuk are to start an investigation. Not long after the fire fighters arrived, a gas cylinder exploded. The explosion was heard throughout the city.

== Geography ==
Ilulissat lies on the eastern shore of Disko Bay, just north of the Ilulissat Icefjord (Greenlandic: Ilulissat Kangerlua), a UNESCO World Heritage Site since 2004.

=== Climate ===
Ilulissat has a tundra climate (ET) with long, cold winters and short, cool summers. Ilulissat is one of the driest settlements in Greenland, receiving only 271 millimetres (10.67 in) of precipitation. Ilulissat is also one of the sunniest settlements in Greenland, especially during summer. Interestingly, March is the coldest month in Ilulissat despite similar locations experiencing February as the coldest month of the year. March also holds the all-time record low temperature of −40.5 °C (−40.9 °F).

Climate data for Ilulissat (normals 1991–2020, extremes 1961–2020)
Month	Jan	Feb	Mar	Apr	May	Jun	Jul	Aug	Sep	Oct	Nov	Dec	Year
Record high °C (°F)	12.2 (54.0)	11.9 (53.4)	12.0 (53.6)	13.3 (55.9)	17.2 (63.0)	21.1 (70.0)	21.7 (71.1)	20.6 (69.1)	18.5 (65.3)	19.4 (66.9)	15.3 (59.5)	12.2 (54.0)	21.7 (71.1)
Mean daily maximum °C (°F)	−9.2 (15.4)	−11.3 (11.7)	−10.9 (12.4)	−4.0 (24.8)	3.1 (37.6)	9.0 (48.2)	11.5 (52.7)	9.6 (49.3)	5.3 (41.5)	−0.3 (31.5)	−4 (25)	−6.3 (20.7)	−0.6 (30.9)
Daily mean °C (°F)	−12.6 (9.3)	−14.8 (5.4)	−14.5 (5.9)	−7.3 (18.9)	0.3 (32.5)	5.8 (42.4)	8.3 (46.9)	6.6 (43.9)	2.6 (36.7)	−2.9 (26.8)	−7 (19)	−9.4 (15.1)	−3.7 (25.2)
Mean daily minimum °C (°F)	−16.2 (2.8)	−18.6 (−1.5)	−18.8 (−1.8)	−11.6 (11.1)	−2.9 (26.8)	2.7 (36.9)	4.9 (40.8)	3.1 (37.6)	−0.5 (31.1)	−6.0 (21.2)	−10.3 (13.5)	−12.7 (9.1)	−7.2 (19.0)
Record low °C (°F)	−34.5 (−30.1)	−36.4 (−33.5)	−40.5 (−40.9)	−29.5 (−21.1)	−22.2 (−8.0)	−5.9 (21.4)	−1.5 (29.3)	−3.4 (25.9)	−13.8 (7.2)	−18.2 (−0.8)	−27.5 (−17.5)	−34.0 (−29.2)	−40.5 (−40.9)
Average precipitation mm (inches)	13.3 (0.52)	15.6 (0.61)	13.3 (0.52)	17.8 (0.70)	18.1 (0.71)	23.7 (0.93)	32.3 (1.27)	30.7 (1.21)	41.1 (1.62)	25.1 (0.99)	22.0 (0.87)	17.6 (0.69)	270.6 (10.64)
Average precipitation days (≥ 1.0 mm)	4.3	4.0	4.0	5.0	4.2	4.8	5.3	5.4	7.4	5.3	5.6	5.0	60.3
Average relative humidity (%)	60.1	62.9	64.9	65.5	70.0	71.6	68.7	70.7	68.3	63.6	58.8	61.0	65.5
Mean monthly sunshine hours	0	28	93	180	279	300	279	217	120	62	30	0	1,588
Percentage possible sunshine	0.0	13.2	25.8	37.4	41.7	41.7	38.4	39.3	30.1	21.9	23.3	0.0	26.1
Source 1: Danish Meteorological Institute (normals temperature 1991-2020, sun/precipitation 1961-1984)
Source 2: World Climate Guide

== Population ==
With 4,670 inhabitants in 2020, Ilulissat is the largest town in the Avannaata municipality. The population increased over 8% relative to 1990 levels but has remained steady since around 2003.

== Tourist attractions ==
- Ilulissat Art Museum

== Transport ==
Ilulissat domestic airport destinations

Air

Ilulissat Airport is located 2.8 km (1.7 mi) to the northeast of the town center, built in 1983. It was expanded with a longer and wider runway in 2026, which enabled flights to Copenhagen. Previously Keflavik, Iceland (with Icelandair) was the only international destination. It also provides connections to towns in northwestern and midwestern Greenland with Air Greenland.

Sea

The Arctic Umiaq ferry links Ilulissat with Sisimiut, Nuuk, and other towns and settlements on the western and southwestern coast of Greenland.

== Sport ==
The town is home to Nagdlunguaq-48 who play in the Greenlandic Men's Football Championship, Greenland's top soccer competition. Nagdlunguaq-48, who play all their league games in Nuuk, have won the championship ten times (as of 2016).

== Film ==
The fourth series of the Danish TV series Borgen (2022) plays partially in the city of Ilulissat and was filmed on location. It was also the location for the filming of Smilla's Sense of Snow (1997).

== Notable people ==
- Knud Rasmussen (1879–1933), noted polar explorer and anthropologist, referred to as the "father of Eskimology"; born in Ilulissat. He was the first man to cross the Northwest Passage via dog sled. He remains well known in Greenland, Denmark and among Canadian Inuit.
- Jørgen Brønlund (1877–1907), also a polar explorer, born in Ilulissat. He grew up with Rasmussen and accompanied him, along with Harald Moltke and Ludvig Mylius-Erichsen, on the Danish Literary Expedition (1902–1904) to examine Inuit culture. In 1906 he joined Mylius-Erichsen and Peter Høegh Hagen on the Danmark-ekspeditionen to map the northernmost regions of Greenland. Jørgen Brønlund Fjord in Peary Land is named after him.
- Kristine Raahauge (1949–2022), municipal politician, activist, eskimologist and writer
- Jens Rosing (1925–2008), artist; designed the coat of arms of Greenland and numerous Greenlandic postage stamps; illustrated children's books; watercolours; born in Ilulissat
- Ricky Enø Jørgensen, racing cyclist

== Twin towns – sister cities ==
Ilulissat is twinned or cooperating with several towns and cities, including:

- Fredericia, Denmark
- Fuglafjørður, Faroe Islands
- Hafnarfjörður, Iceland

== Gallery ==
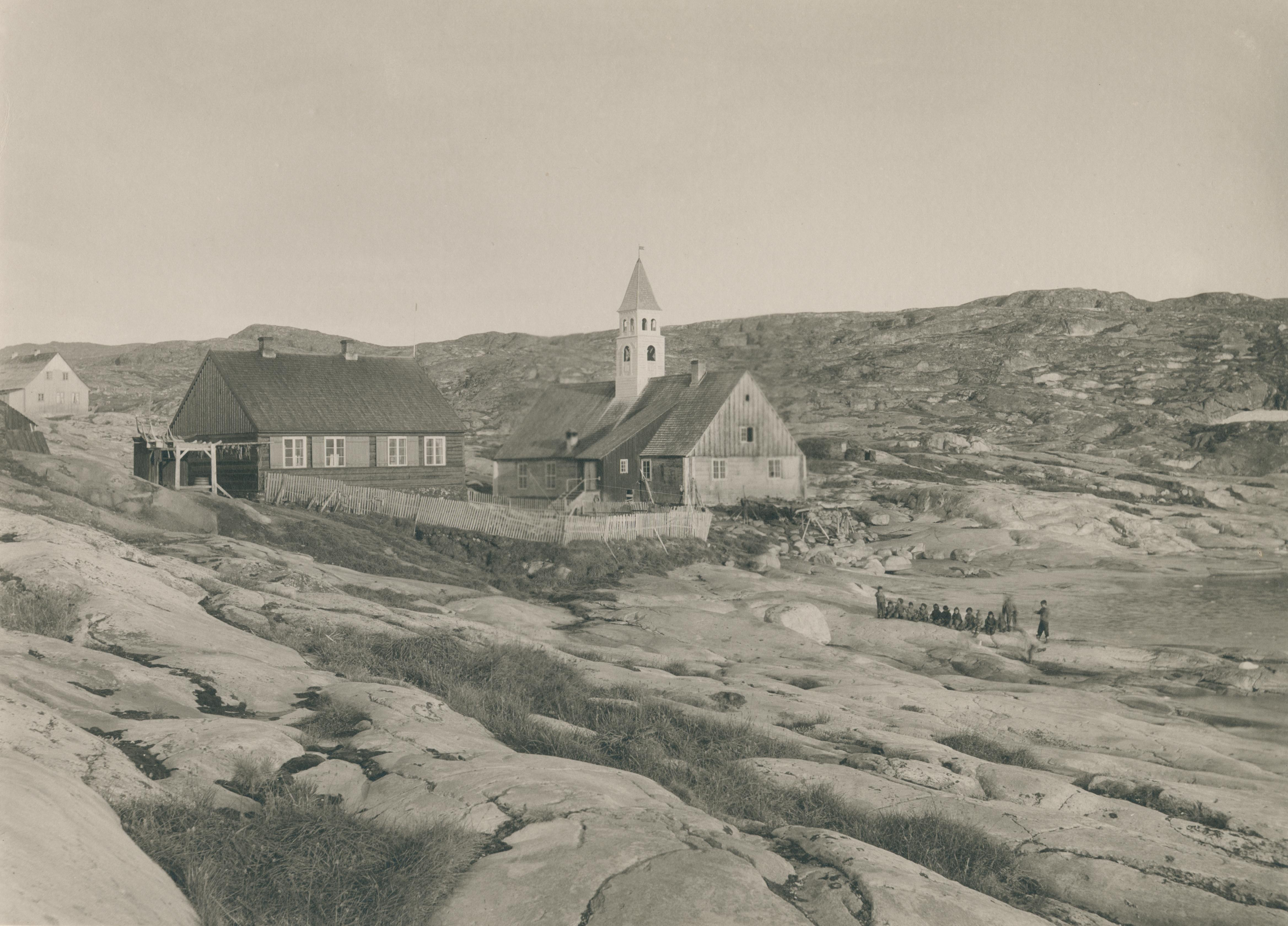
Church and doctor's residence of the town Jacobshavn (1900)

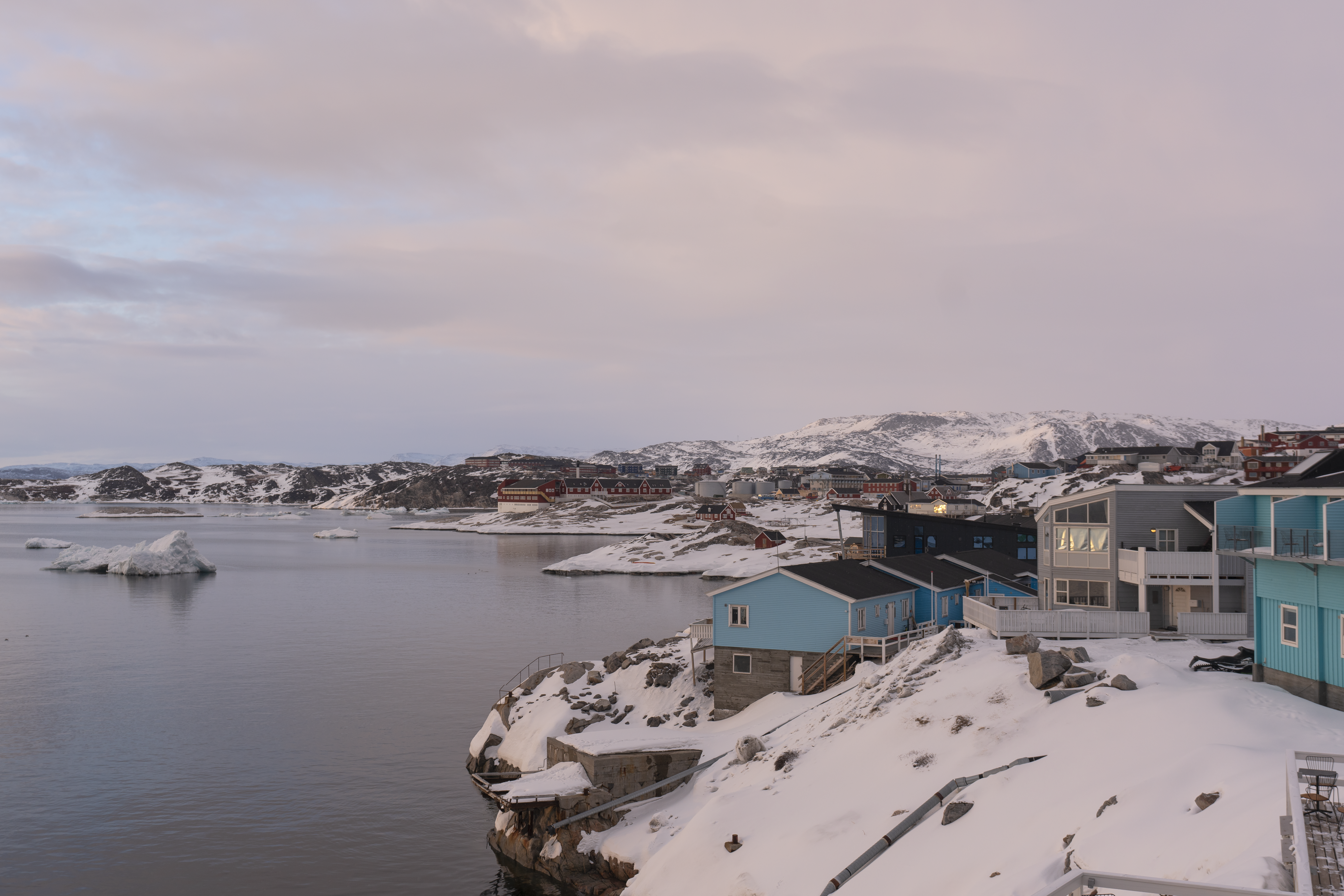
Ilulissat harbor

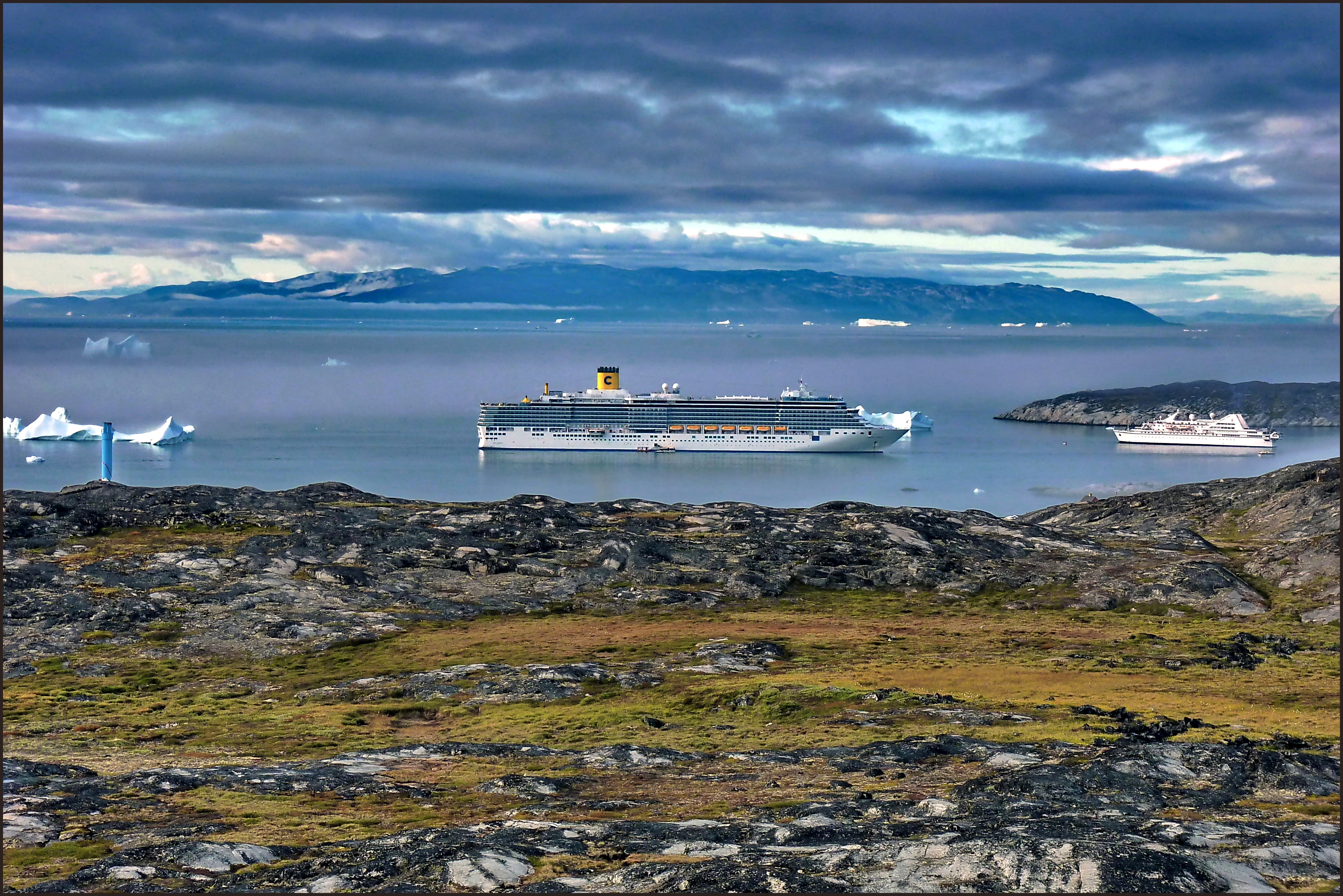
Cruise ships in the fjord front of Ilulissat

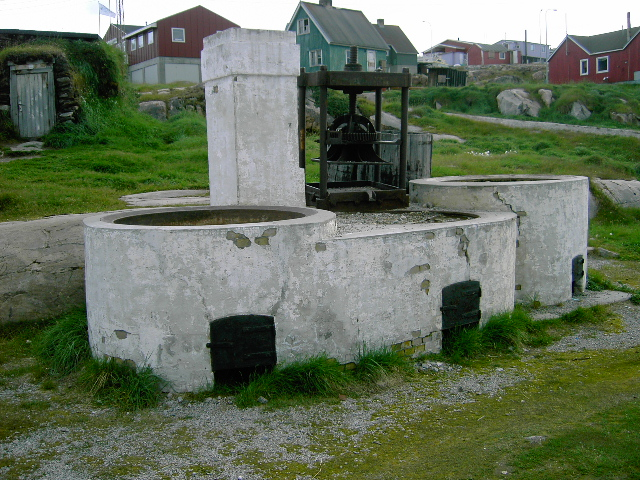
"Trankessel" for boiling blubber in Ilulissat, Greenland

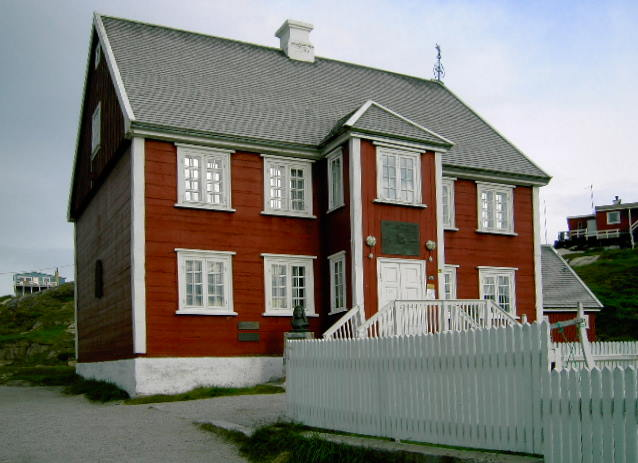
Knud Rasmussen's birthplace in Ilulissat, Greenland; Knud Rasmussen's Museum

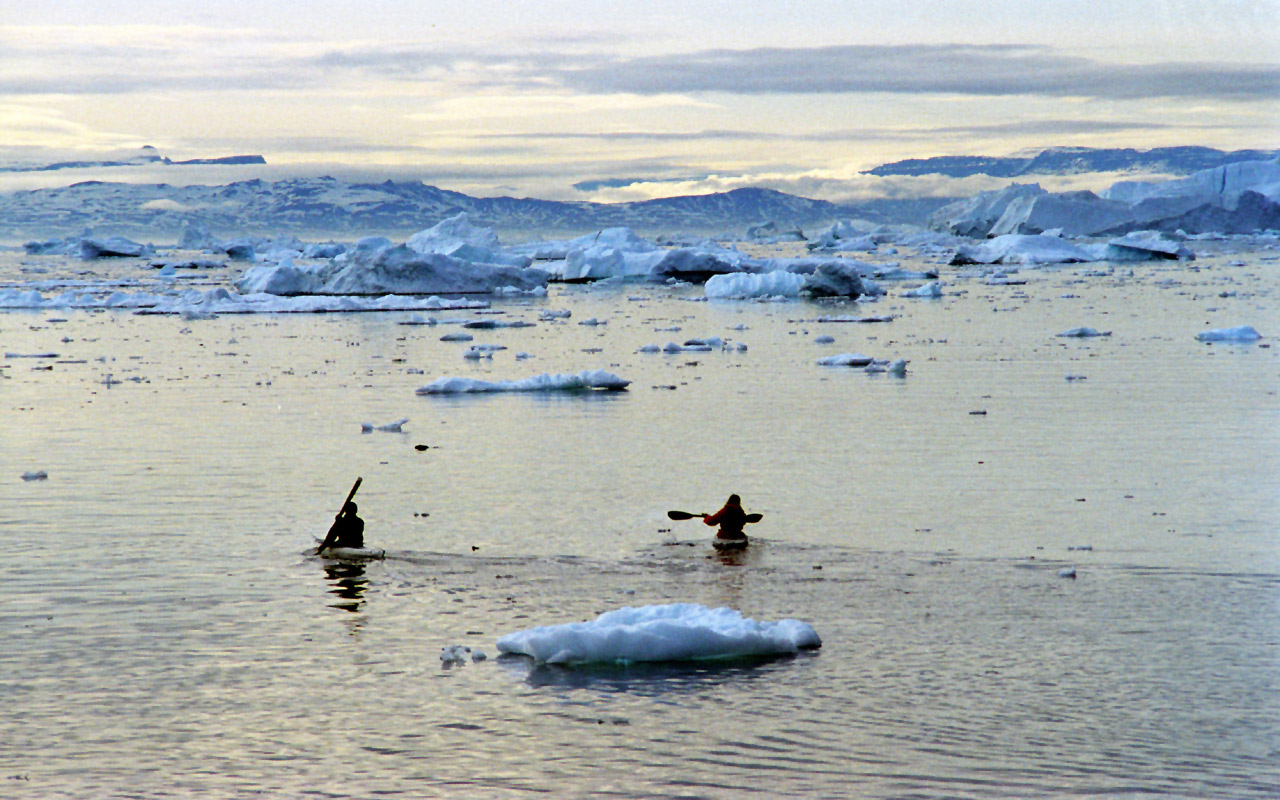
Kayaking in Ilulissat

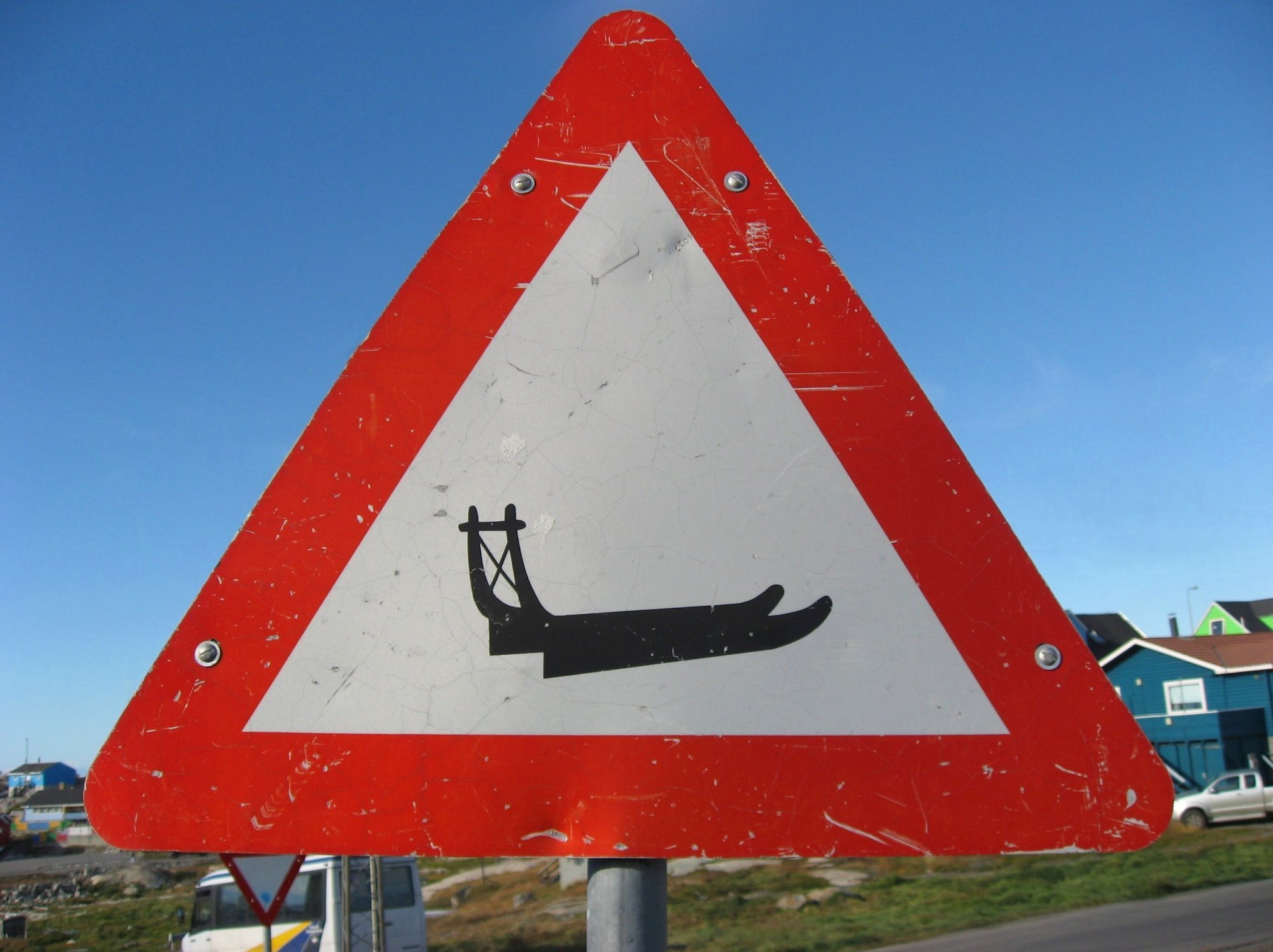
Dog sled sign in Ilulissat

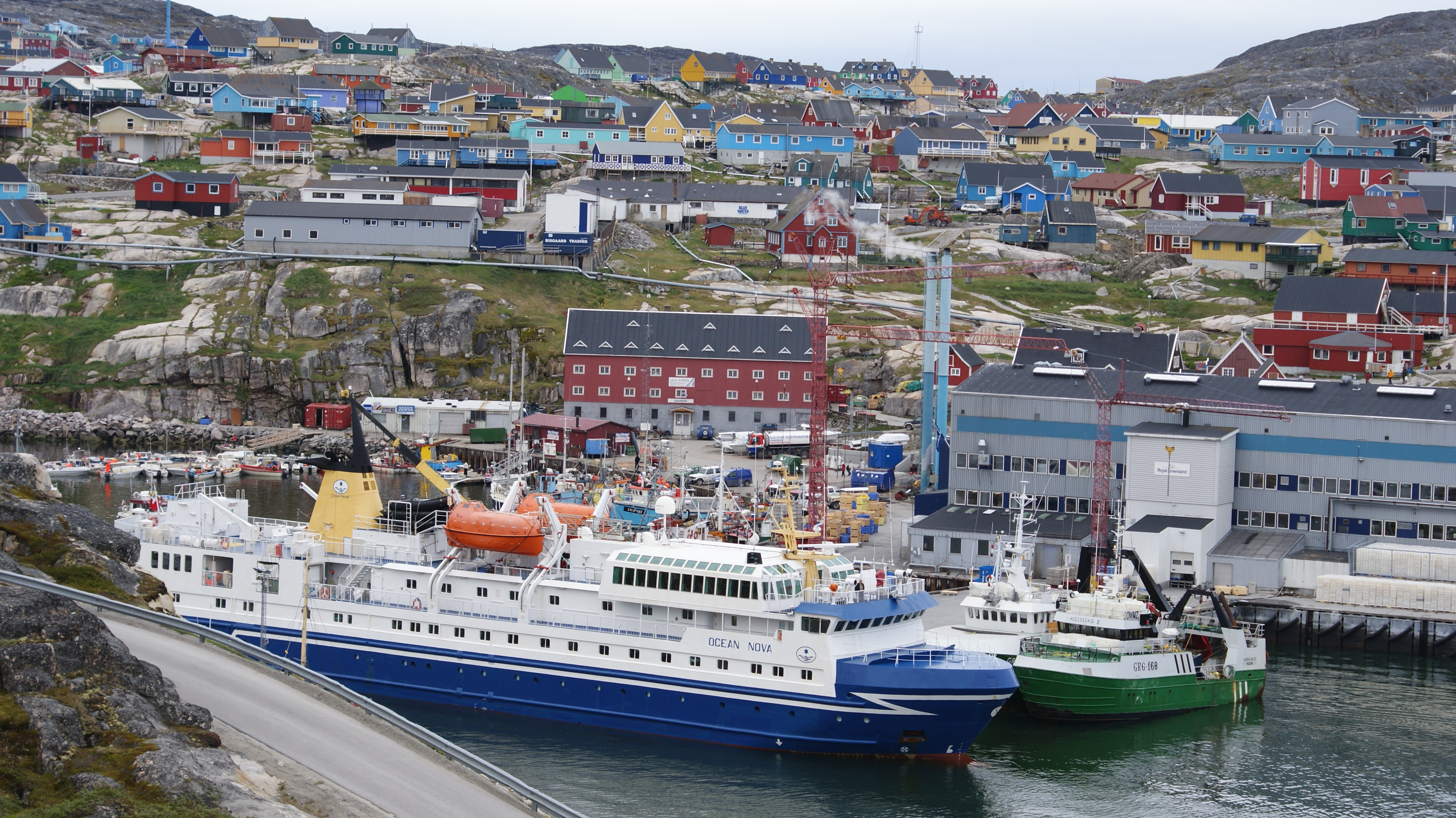
Cruise ship at Ilulissat port

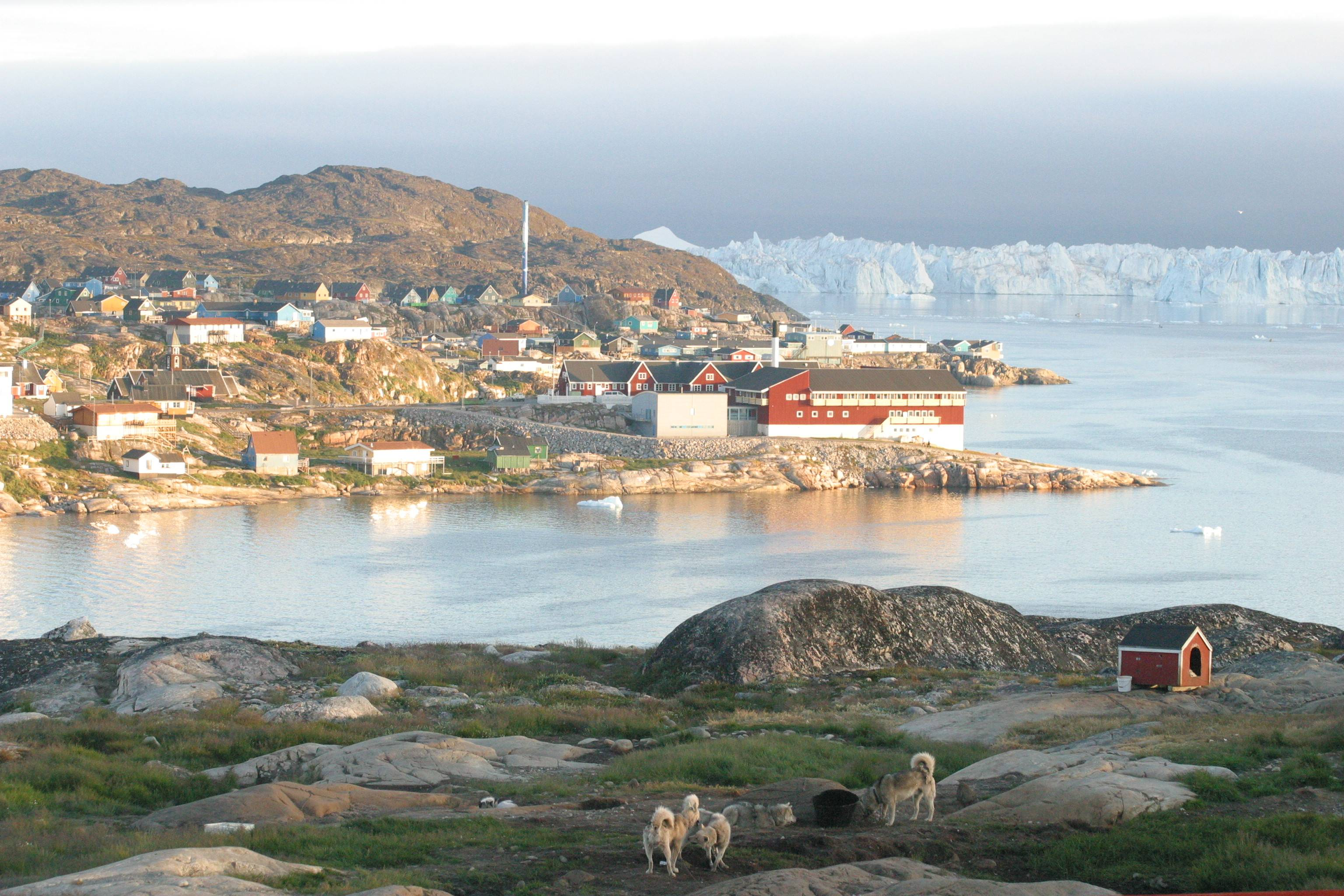
Ilulissat, old part of the city with icebergs from the Ilulissat Icefjord in the background

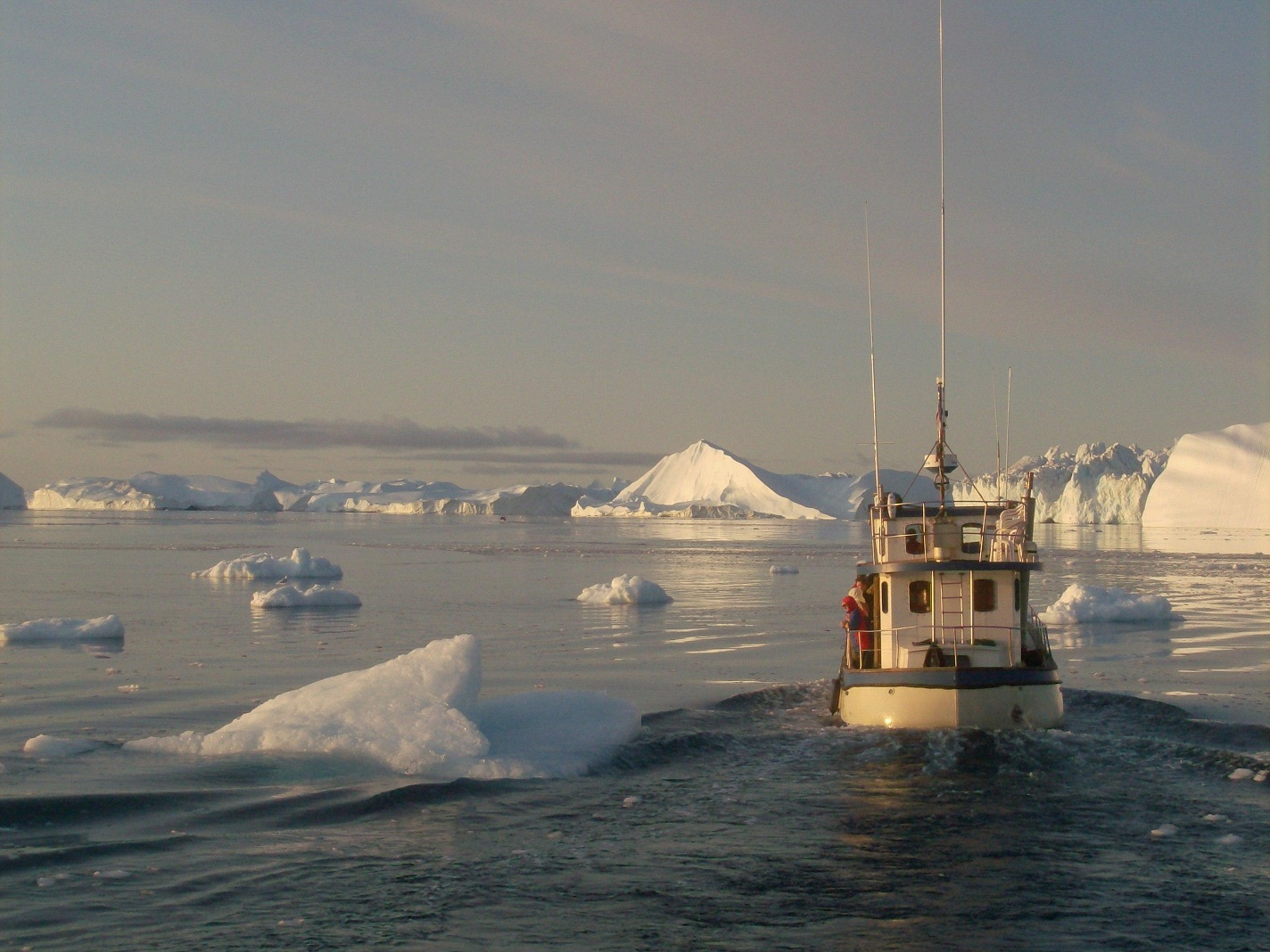
Sailing in Ilulissat Icefjord

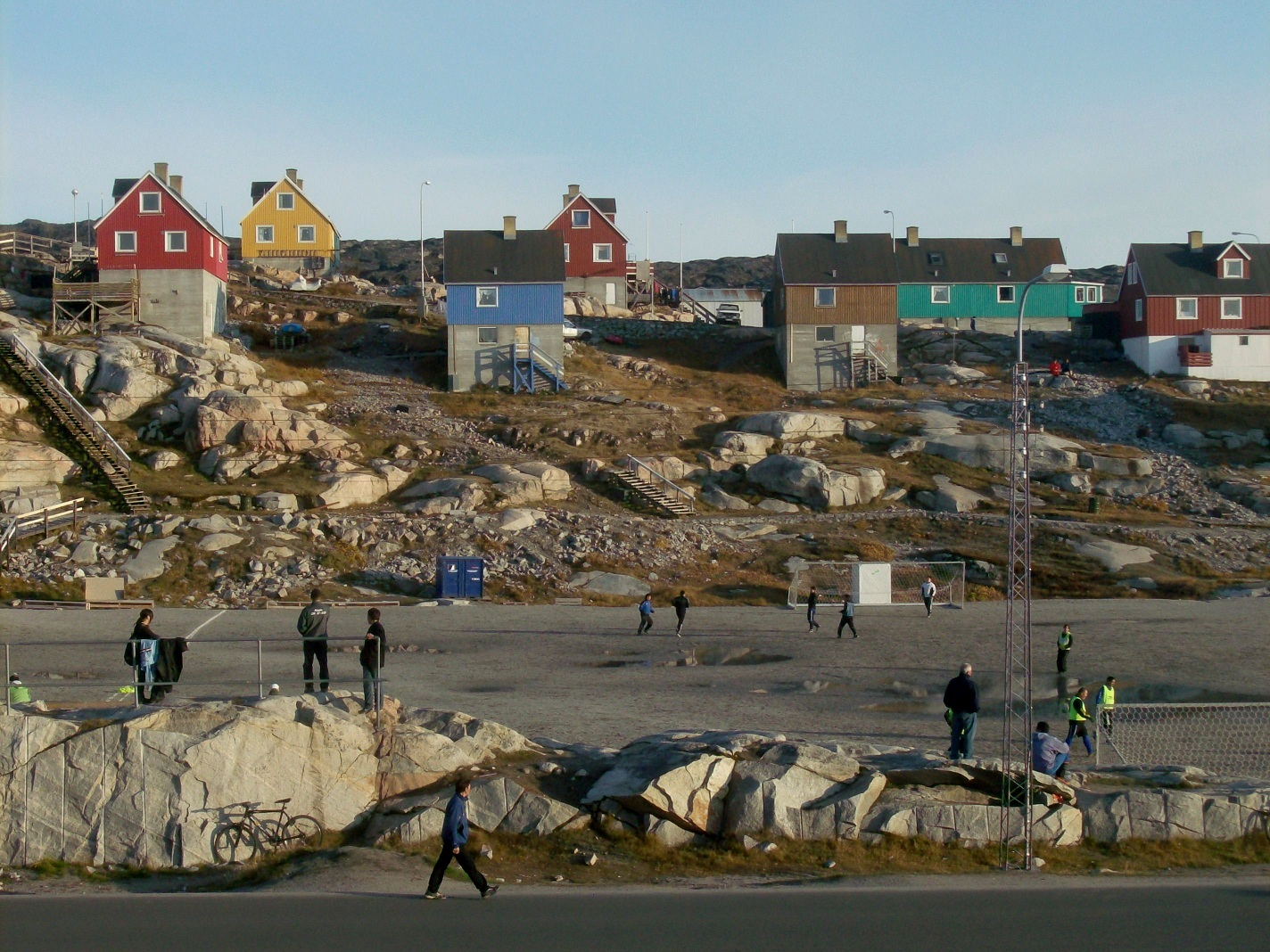
The football field

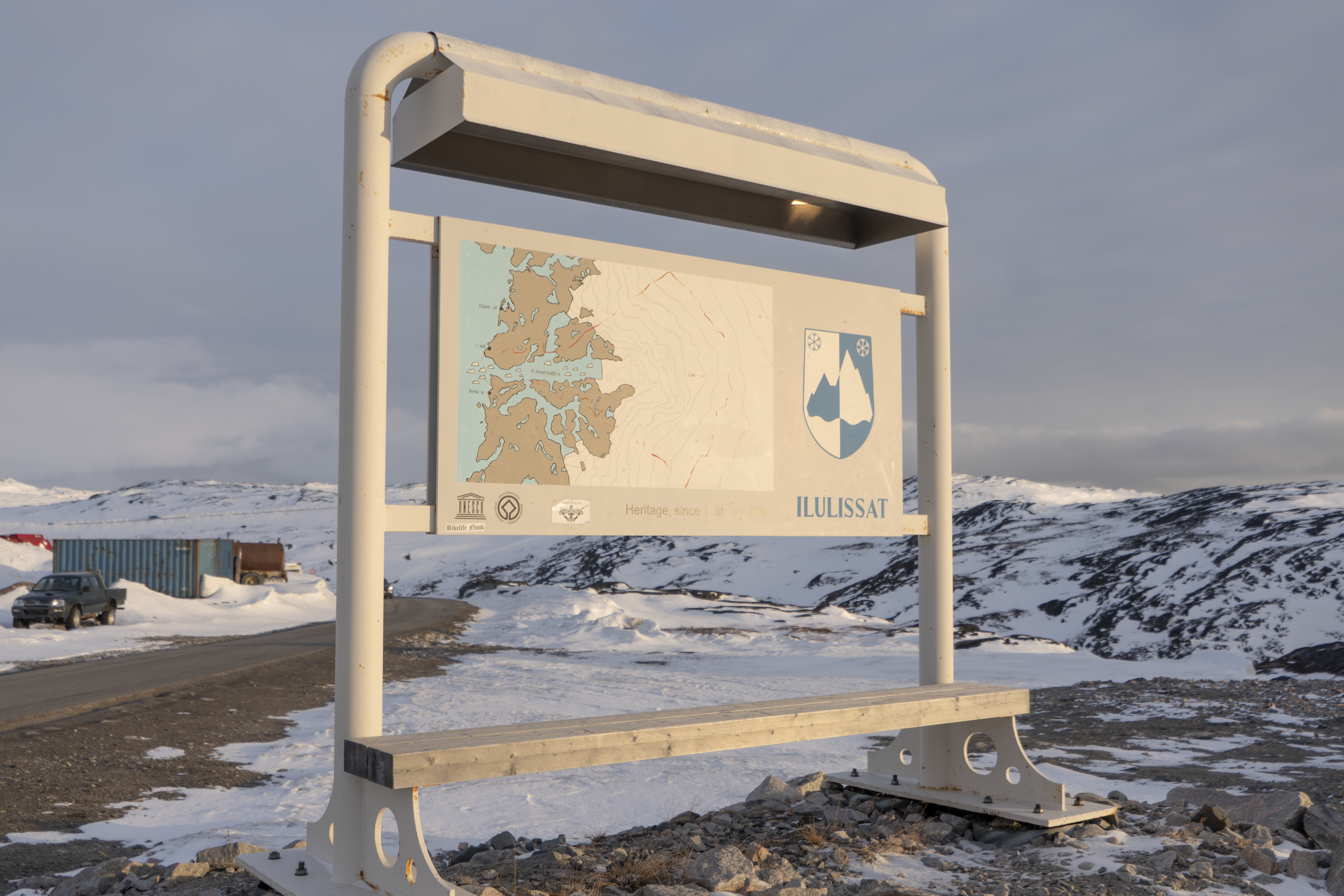
Ilulissat welcome sign

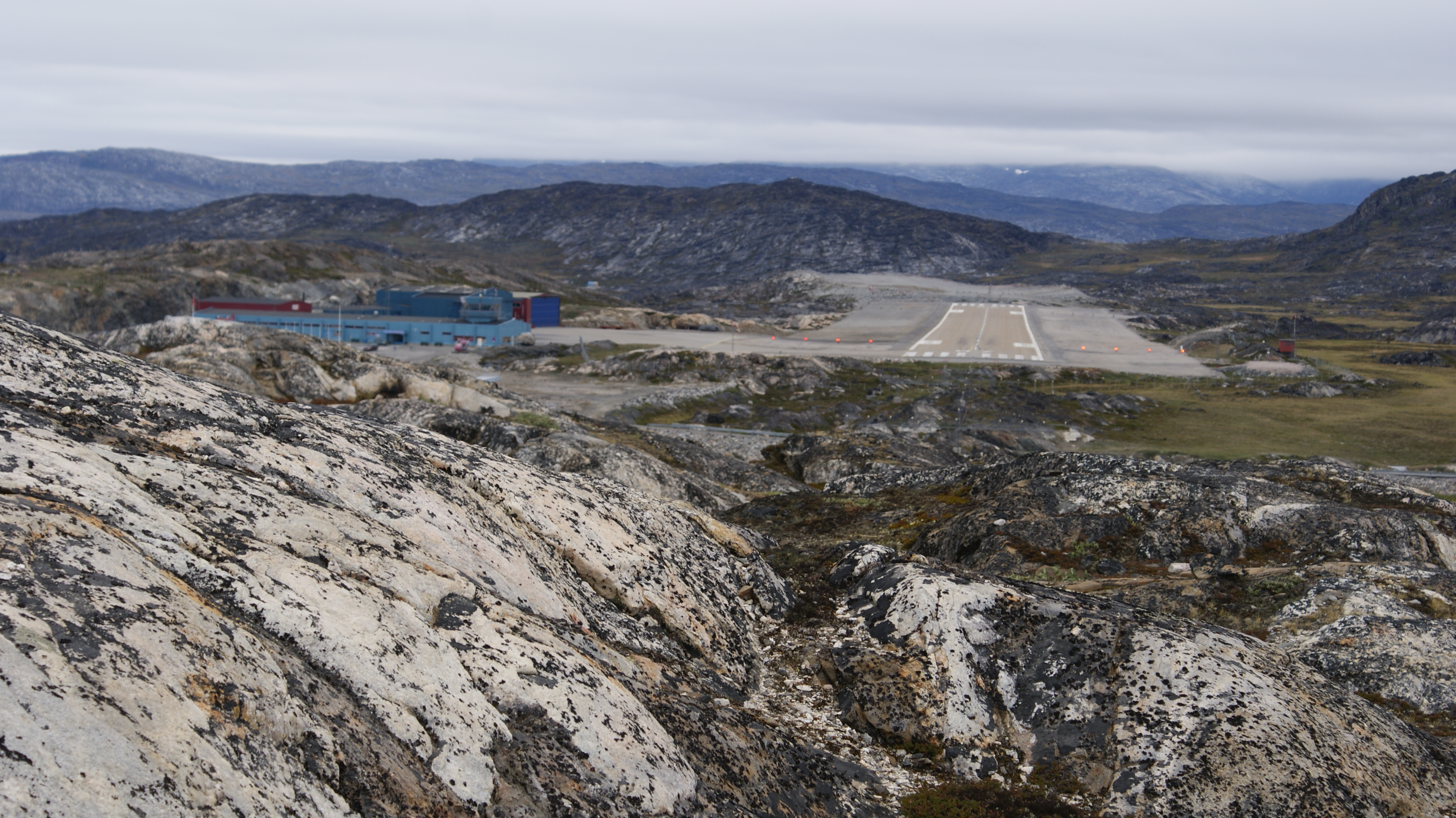
Ilulissat Airport from the south

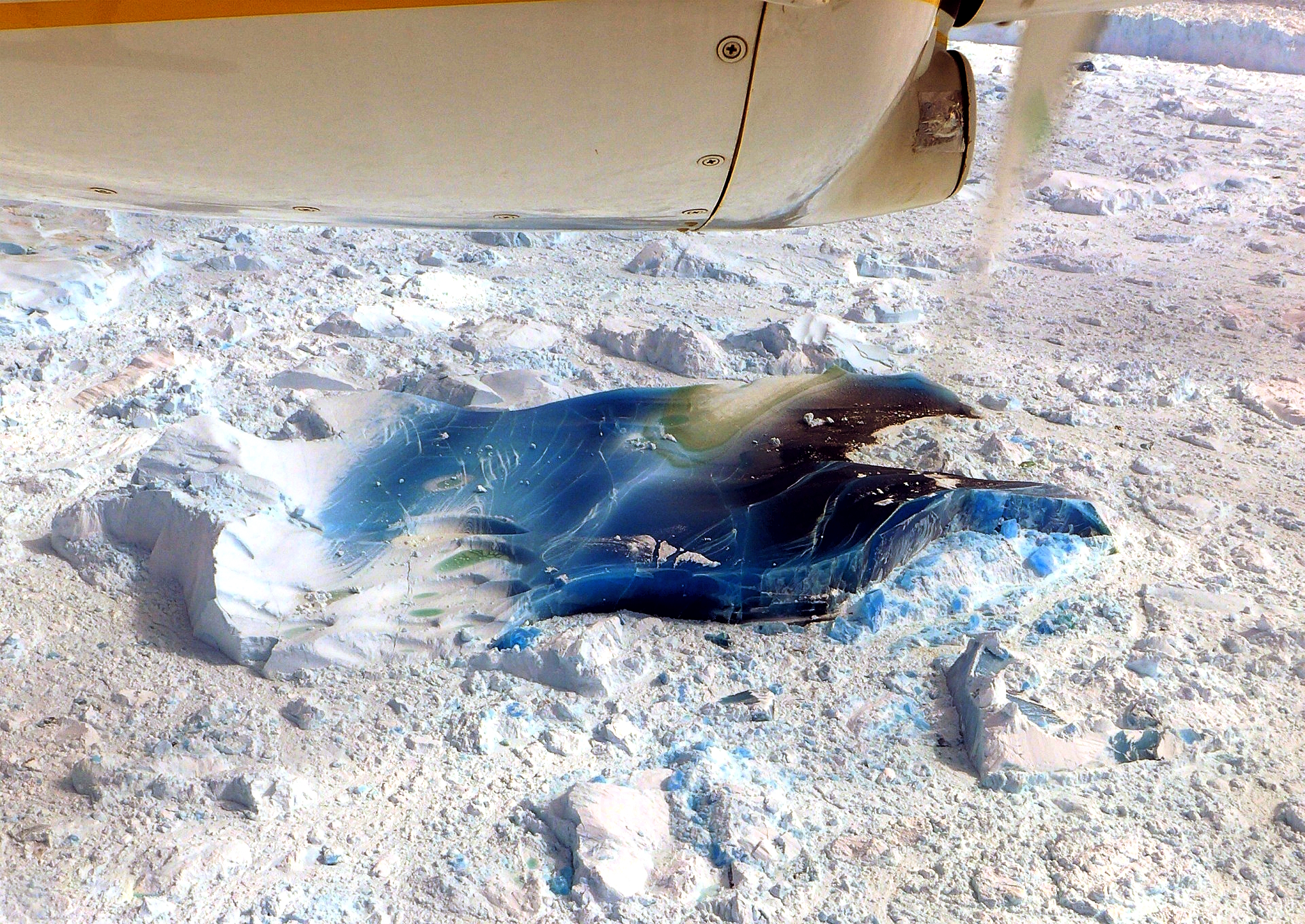
Blue iceberg in the Ilulissat Icefjord

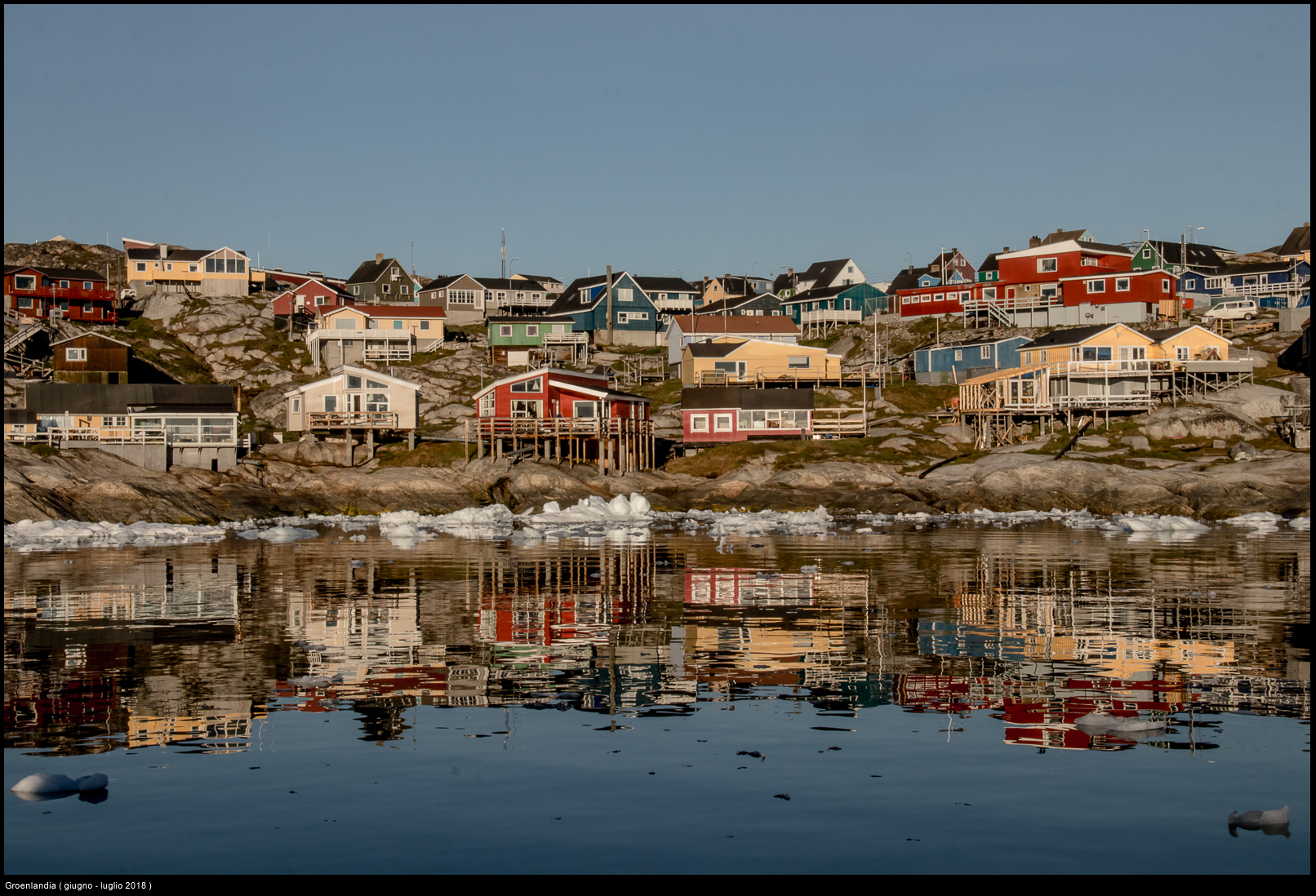
View of Ilulissat city from the sea

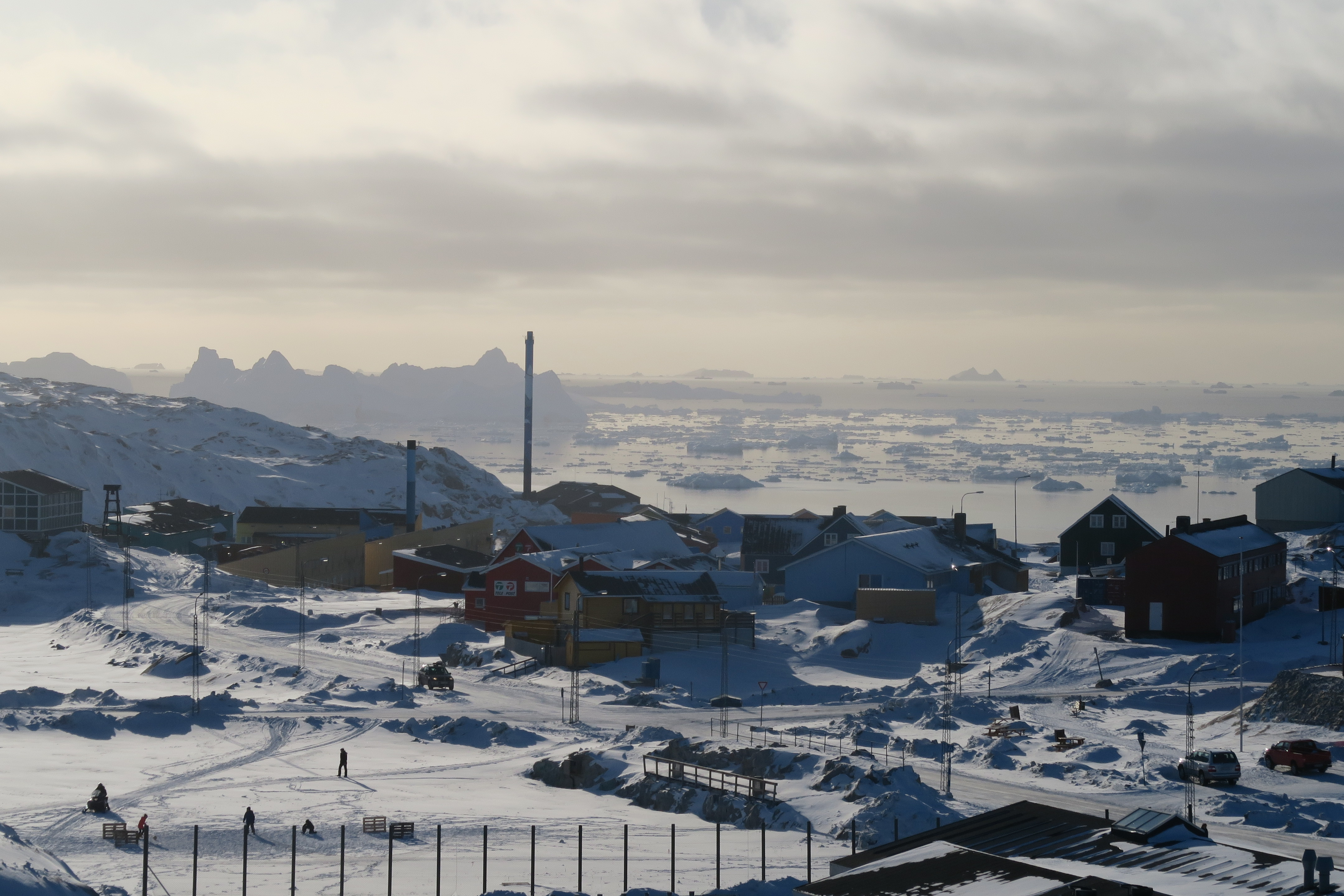
Ilulissat under snow

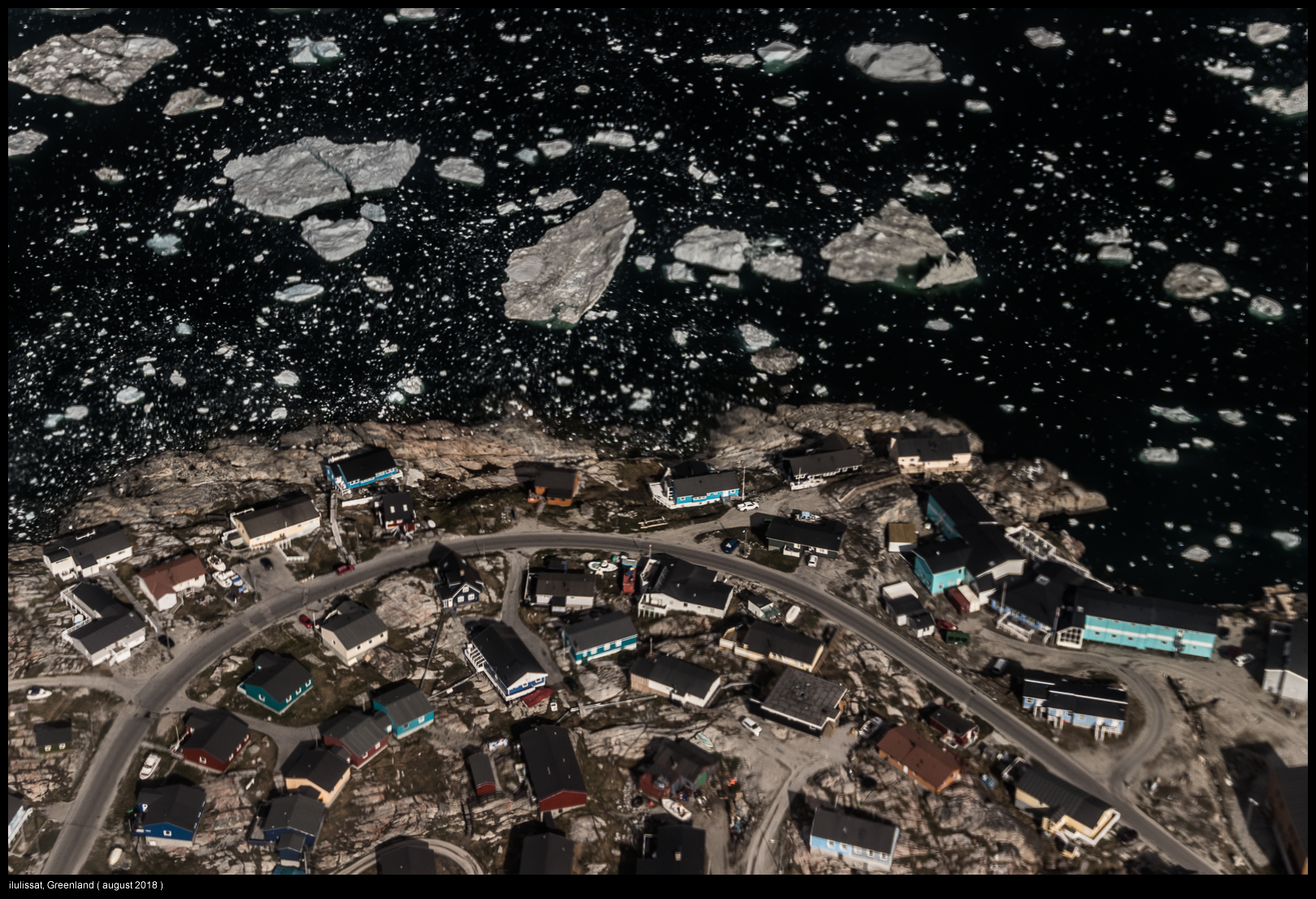
Ilulissat from a plane

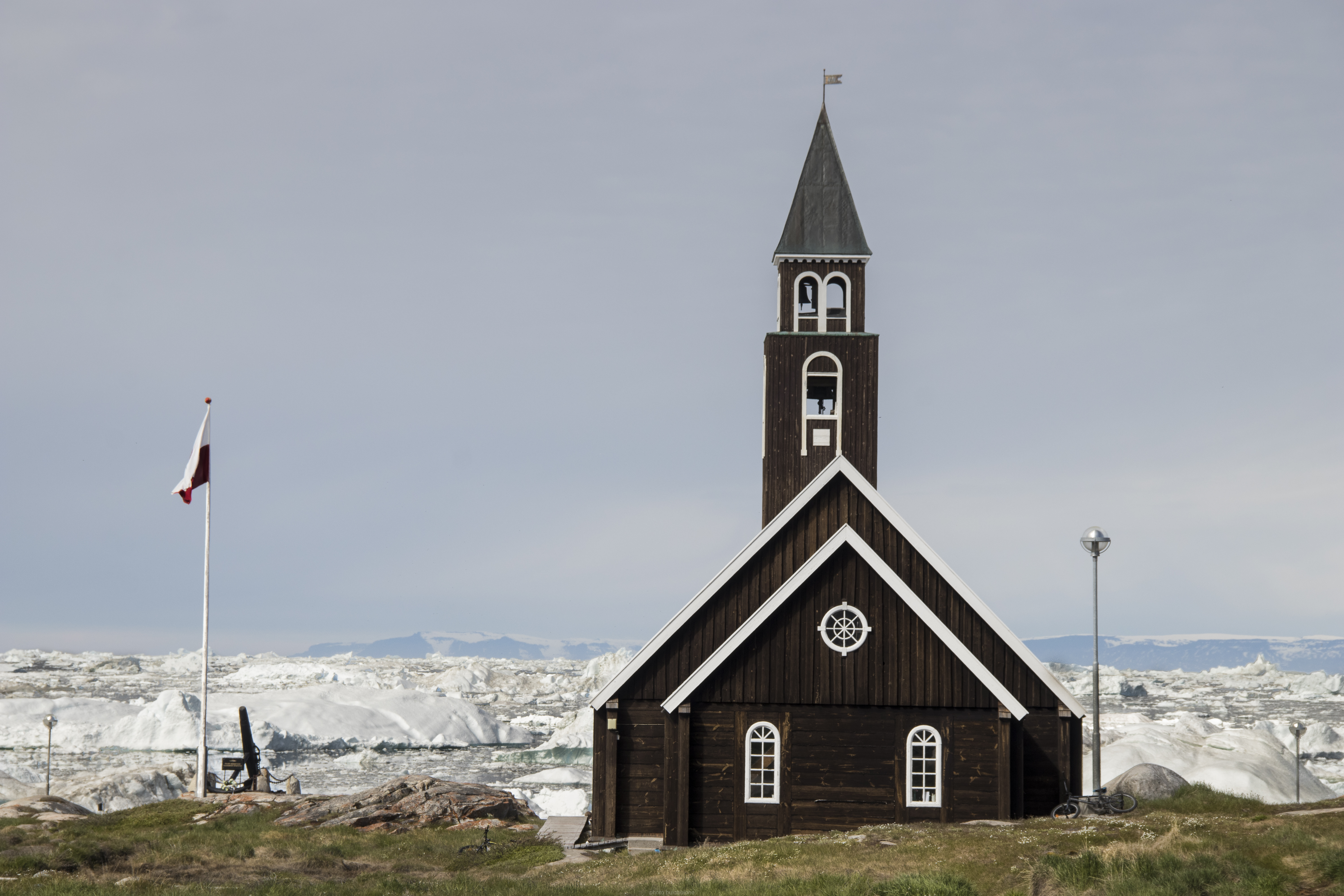
Ilulissat Church
