= Knud Rasmussen's Museum =

Historic home and museum in Ilulissat, Greenland

Coordinates: 69.2192°N 51.1043°W

- Knud Rasmussens Hus
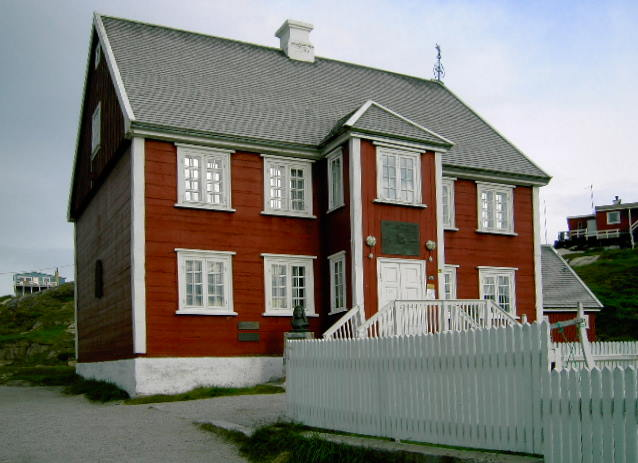
- Established: 1939
- Location: Ilulissat, Greenland
- Website: https://knudrasmus.dk/

Ilulissat Museum is a museum dedicated to the famous Danish explorer Knud Rasmussen. It is located in the town of Ilulissat, Greenland.

== History ==
The house was built in 1917 and designed by Helge Bojsen-Møller. Since 1939, the house has served as a museum dedicated to Rasmussen. In 2011, the house experienced a fire, yet the house and furniture were saved.
