= Sermermiut =

Abandoned settlement in Greenland

Coordinates: 69.202°N 51.126°W

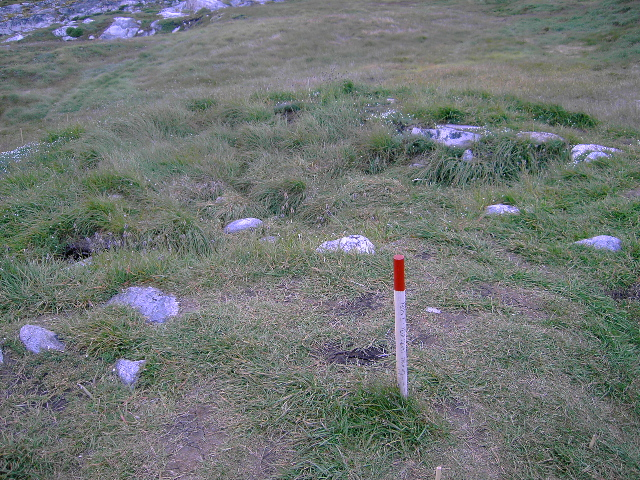
Archaeological remains of the Saqqaq culture in Sermermiut

Sermermiut was an Inuit settlement in the Disko Bay, Greenland. The location is now part of the Ilulissat Icefjord World Heritage Site.

== History ==
The pre-colonial history of Sermermiut was pieced together by a series of archaeological excavations during the twentieth century. The area became an area of archaeological interest at the start of the century, although the results were not well documented. A 1953 dig identified that Sermermiut had been used by Saqqaq, Early Dorset and Thule cultures. Another dig in 1983 dated the start of the Early Dorset settlement at around 600–200 BCE.

Sermermiut was abandoned in 1850 when the last resident moved to nearby Jacobshavn (Ilulissat).
