= Ilulissat Icefjord =

Fjord in Greenland, Kingdom of Denmark

UNESCO World Heritage Site
- Icebergs in the Ilulissat Icefjord

- Location within Greenland
- Location: Avannaata, Greenland
- Criteria: Natural: (vii), (viii)
- Reference: 1149
- Inscription: 2004 (28th Session)
- Area: 402,400 ha (994,000 acres)
- Coordinates: 69°9′N 49°33′W

Ilulissat Icefjord (Greenlandic: Ilulissat Kangerlua) is a fjord in western Greenland. Located 250 km north of the Arctic Circle, the Ilulissat Icefjord runs west 40 km (25 mi) from the Greenland ice sheet to Disko Bay just south of the town of Ilulissat. Ilulissat Icefjord was declared a UNESCO World Heritage Site in 2004 because of its natural beauty and the importance of the fast-moving Jacobshavn Glacier in developing the current scientific understanding of anthropogenic climate change.

Map of Ilulissat Icefjord

== Geography ==
The fjord contains the Jacobshavn Isbræ (Greenlandic: Sermeq Kujalleq), the most productive glacier in the Northern Hemisphere. The glacier flows at a rate of 20–35 m (66–115 ft) per day, resulting in around 20 billion tonnes of icebergs calved off and passing out of the fjord every year. The ice from the fjord extends to about 250,000 years in age, making it a feature of attention for studying past climatology.

Icebergs breaking from the glacier are often so large —up to a kilometer (3,300 ft) in height— that they are too tall to float down the fjord and lie stuck on the bottom of its shallower areas, sometimes for years, until they are broken up by the force of the glacier and icebergs further up the fjord. On breaking up, the icebergs emerge into the open sea and initially travel north with ocean currents before turning south and running into the Atlantic Ocean. Larger icebergs typically do not melt until they reach 40-45 degrees north —farther south than the United Kingdom and level with New York City.

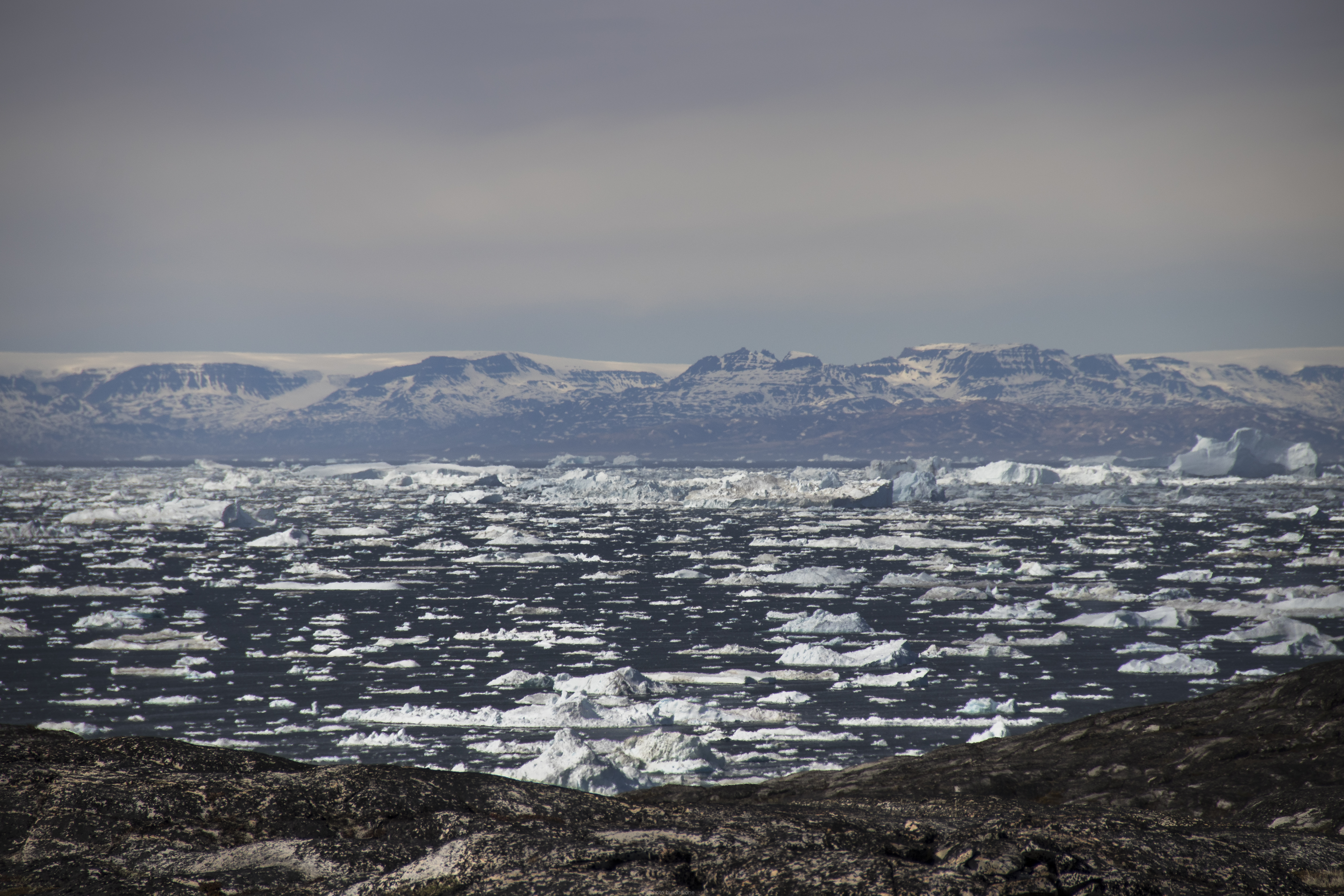
Ilulissat Icefjord

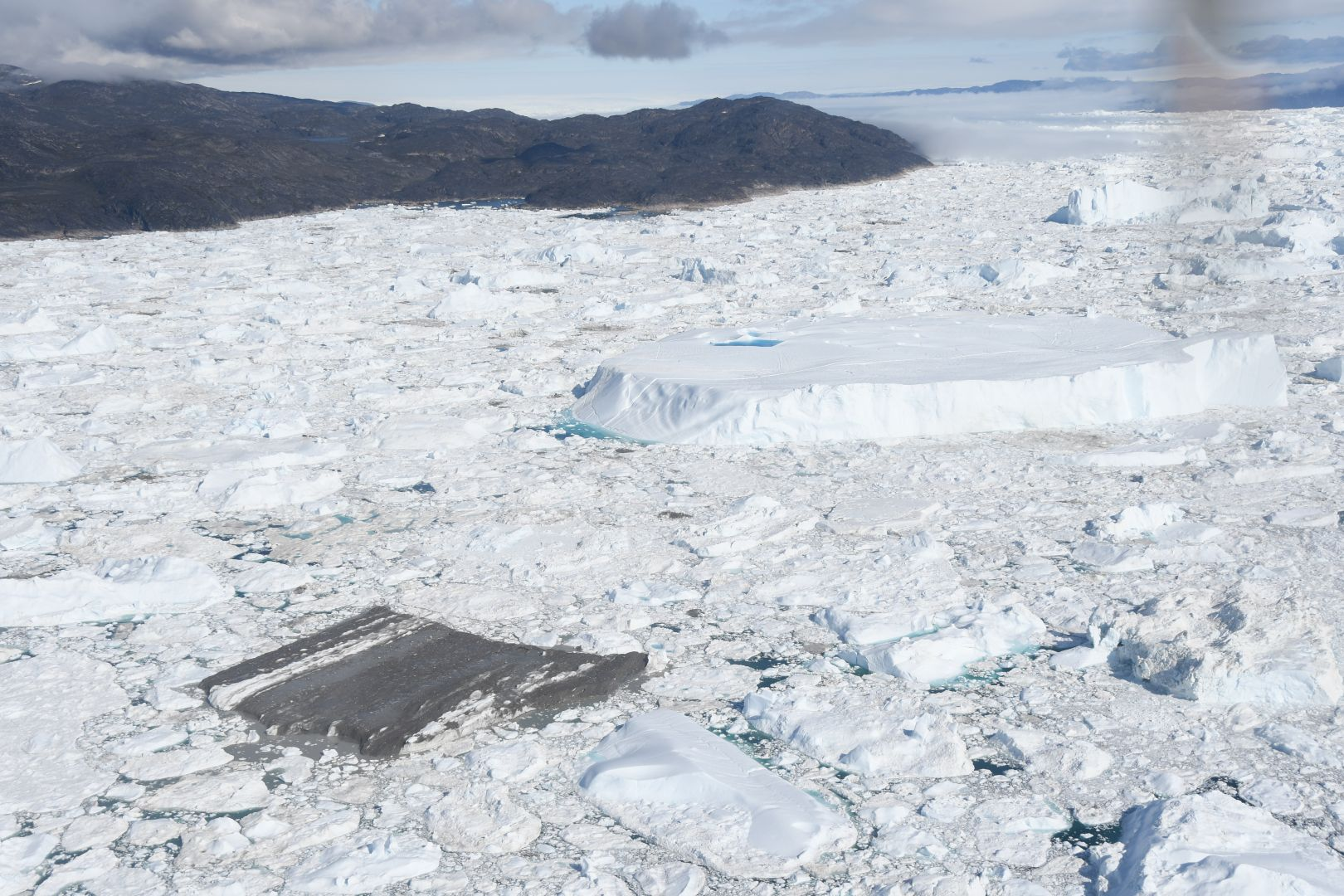
Ice fjord of Ilulissat; bottom left a toppled iceberg, and in the middle an iceberg with a (blue) meltwater lake

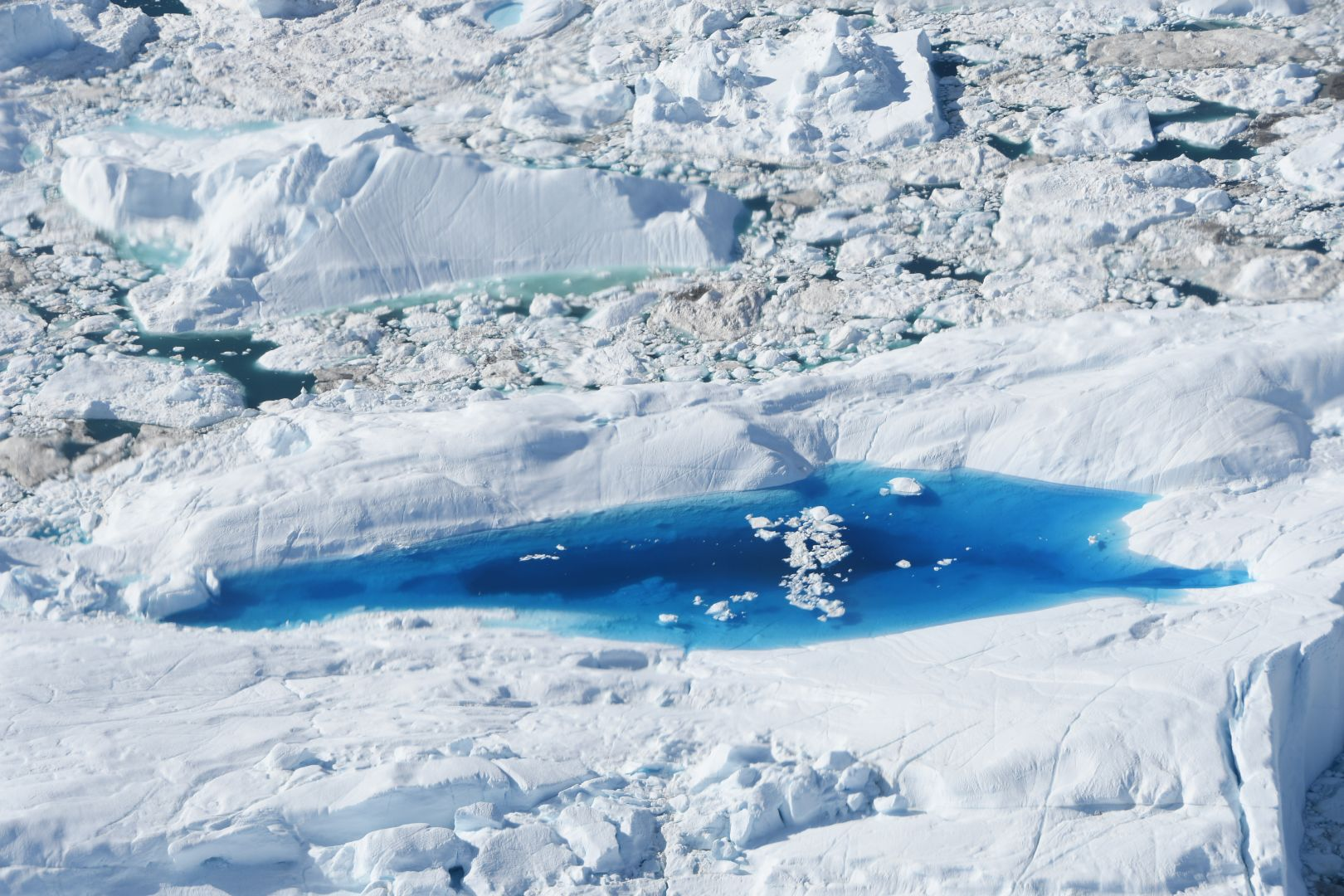
Meltwater lake on top of an iceberg

== Settlements and human activities ==
The area has been settled since at least almost 4,000 years ago, proven by the Sermermiut site containing remnants from three Inuit cultures, including Saqqaq, Early Dorset and Thule cultures.

Modern settlements throughout the fjord include Ilulissat, Ilimanaq, and Qasigiannguit, by which residents utilizes the fjord for fishing and hunting such as the Greenland halibut and ringed seals, albeit in a only limited time in a year, primarily in winter, when ice activities are at the lowest. Fishing activities are normally done with dogsleds given that the fjord is frozen all year-round, although more frequent ice clearances from climate change gives way for boat usages for fishing. Residents prefer game from the fjord given its larger sizes than the ones outside the fjord such as nearby Disko Bay, possibly due to the lack of apex predators such as the Greenland shark and polar bears, in addition to low fishing intensity.

Tourism picked up since 1980s and increased significantly after being recognized as a World Heritage Site, with Ilulissat gained a significant amount of visitors. By the 2020s, several infrastructure developments are planned to cater for tourism, including an international airport, and ports to provide a more direct access to Ilulissat.

== See also ==
- List of fjords of Greenland

== Bibliography ==
- Ilulissat Icefjord. Book edited by Ole Bennike, Naja Mikkelsen, Greg McCollum, Henrik Klinge Pedersen and Anker Weidick, Geological Survey of Denmark and Greenland, 28 September 2004, ISBN 87-7871-136-3
