= Porsild =

Porsild is a Danish surname, and may refer to:

- Anntonia Porsild, Thai-Danish model, actress and beauty pageant titleholder
- Morten Pedersen Porsild (1872–1956), Danish botanist
- Erling Porsild, Danish-Canadian botanist
