= Paul Gelting =

Danish ecologist, botanist and lichenologist

Paul Emil Elliot Gelting (30 March 1905 – 18 February 1964) was a Danish ecologist, botanist and lichenologist. He was associate professor at the University of Copenhagen and particularly active in Greenland.

Gelting participated in the Three-year Expedition to East Greenland 1931-34 led by Lauge Koch and the expedition 1938–39 to Northeast Greenland led by Eigil Knuth. From 1946 to 1954, he headed the Arctic Station Qeqertarsuaq, which had been founded by Morten Pedersen Porsild.

Gelting is honoured in the name of the fungal genus Geltingia.

== Selected scientific bibliography ==
- Gelting, P. (1934) Studies on the vascular plants of East Greenland between Franz Josef Fjord and Dove Bay (73°20'-76°20' N). Meddelelser om Grønland 101: 1–340.
- Gelting, P. (1937) Studies on the food of the East Greenland ptarmigan especially in its relation to vegetation and snow-cover. Meddelelser om Grønland 116 (1): 1–196.
- Gelting, P. (1937) On Lithoderma fatiscens Areschoug and L. fatiscens Kuckuk. Especially in its relation to vegetation and snow-cover. Meddelelser om Grønland 116 (3): 1–196.
- Gelting, P. (1939) Karplanternes vertikale Udbredelse i Nordøstgrønland i Forhold til Isfremstød og Epirogenese (The vertical distribution of plants in Northeast Greenland in relation to glacier advance and land uplift). Nordiska (19. skandinaviska) naturforskarmötet i Helsingfors den 11-15 augusti 1936: 3 pp.
- Gelting, P. (1941) Über pleistozäne Pflanzenrefugien in Grønland (On Pleistocene refugia for plants in Greenland). Mitteilungen der Naturforschenden Gesellschaft Schaffhausen 17: 74–96.
- Gelting, P. (1956) Parmelia subaurifera Nyl. and P. fraudans (Nyl.) Nyl. in Greenland. Friesia 35: 240–246.
