= Arctic Velvet =

- Type: Ultra Premium
- Manufacturer: ThoCon AG
- Origin: Switzerland
- Introduced: 2009
- Alcohol by volume: 40.0%
- Proof (US): 80
- Variants: Vodka, Gin, Whisky, Aquavit Aqua vitae
- Related products: List of vodkas, List of cocktails

Arctic Velvet is a range of products from the company ThoCon AG based in Cham, Switzerland. The product range consists of Whisky, Gin, Vodka and Aquavit Aqua vitae. These products' specialty is that they are produced with water from Greenland. All the products are distilled five times or more.

The artesian well is based in Qeqertarsuaq in the western part of Greenland and is approximately 2000 years old. It originates from a volcanic stone and its water has a PH-value of 9.38. It is naturally alkaline, which makes it very smooth and has a value of under 1 degree on the German scale of water hardness [dH].

The government has signed a contract in 2006 allowing Greenland Spring Water (the water supplier of Arctic Velvet) to export mineral water from Qeqertarsuaq. They investigated three years to assess the commercial possibilities of selling Greenlandic water products internationally. Since August 2008 the contract with the government to export water from Greenland is in place. The economy of Greenland expects to create new jobs in Qeqertarsuaq.
