= Tahoe (disambiguation) =

Tahoe commonly refers to Lake Tahoe, a large freshwater lake on the California–Nevada border in the United States, a popular tourist destination.

Tahoe may also refer to:

== Places ==
- Tahoe City, California, US, formerly called Tahoe
- Lake Tahoe (Victoria Island), lake on Victoria Island, Canada

== Computing ==
- The Power 6/32 minicomputer by Computer Consoles Inc.
- TCP Tahoe, a variant of Transmission Control Protocol
- 4.3BSD-Tahoe, a release of Berkeley Software Distribution Unix
- Tahoe-LAFS (Tahoe Least-Authority File Store), a distributed filesystem
- Tahoe, an initiative that led to Microsoft SharePoint
- macOS Tahoe, an operating system developed by Apple Inc.

== Arts and entertainment ==
- "Lake Tahoe", a song on the 2011 album 50 Words for Snow by Kate Bush
- Lake Tahoe (film), a 2008 Mexican drama directed by Fernando Eimbcke
- Tahoe (album), an album by Fred Warmsley, under the alias Dedekind Cut

== Transport ==
- The Tahoe, a 2-6-0 locomotive on the Virginia and Truckee Railroad
- Chevrolet Tahoe, a sport utility vehicle
- SS Tahoe, a steamship that operated on Lake Tahoe
- USS Tahoe (CM-2), a former US Navy minelayer

== See also ==
- Taho, a Philippine snack food made of fresh soft/silken tofu
  - Tofu (Indonesian: Taho), a soy milk curd
- Sunnyside–Tahoe City, California, US
- "Fast Times in Tahoe", a song by New Zealand band Elemeno P
