= Blæsedalen =

Valley in Qeqertalik, Greenland

Coordinates: 69.35°N 53.50°W

Blæsedalen (Greenlandic: Itinneq Kangilleq) is a large glacial valley on Disko Island, Western Greenland. The north-south U-formed valley features include icing ridges and a braided river system; Røde Elv (red river) has red sediment, which colours its water. The valley is situated north of Qeqertarsuaq and stretches northward approximately 30 kilometres (19 mi) to Kangerluk. The valley is fed by outlet-glaciers from Lyngemarkens Iskappe.
