= Erling Porsild =

Danish-Canadian botanist (1901-1977)

Alf Erling Porsild
- Born: January 17, 1901; Copenhagen, Denmark
- Died: November 14, 1977 (aged 76); Vienna, Austria
- Known for: Flora of the Arctic, coining the word pingo
- Awards: Massey Medal for 1966
- Scientific career
- Fields: Botany
- Workplaces: National Museum of Canada

Alf Erling Porsild (1901–1977) was a Danish-Canadian botanist.

== Biography ==
He was born in Copenhagen as a son of the botanist M.P. Porsild. He grew up on the Arctic Station in Qeqertarsuaq, West Greenland, where he acted as assistant to his father.

Between 1936 and 1945, he was curator at the National Museum of Canada, Ottawa, and from 1945 to 1967 he was head of the department of botany there. He authored over 100 scientific articles on the flora of the Canadian Arctic Archipelago and of the Rocky Mountains, as well as numerous popular papers and books, including important flora of Canada's Arctic and northern regions.

He made over 25,000 plant collections in the Canadian archipelago, mostly around Tahoe and Washburn lake on Victoria island, resulting in over 100,000 specimens which are deposited in the National Herbarium of Canada (CAN) at the Canadian Museum of Nature, Ottawa, and in other herbaria around the world.

Porsild was hired to take part in the Canadian Reindeer Project to bring reindeer-herding to the indigenous populations of northern Canada in the hopes of building a sustainable industry.

He borrowed the term pingo from the Inuit and made it a scientific and vernacular term (first used in 1938). Porsild Pingo in Tuktoyaktuk is named in his honor, as well as Mount Porsild in the Yukon Territory. Porsild's starwort (Stellaria porsildii), a plant native to mountains in Arizona and New Mexico, is also named in his honor.

=== Legacy ===
The Canadian Botanical Association awards annually the 'Alf Erling Porsild Award', in recognition of the best paper published in the field of systematics and phytogeography that year by a graduate student in a Canadian university or a Canadian student in a foreign university.

Porsild was awarded the Massey Medal by the Royal Canadian Geographical Society in 1966. He was awarded the George Lawson Medal by the Canadian Botanical Association in 1971.

He was portrayed by Colm Feore in Peter Lynch's 1998 documentary film The Herd.

== Selected works ==
- Porsild, A.E. (1920) Sur le poids et les dimensions des graines arctiques. Revue Générale de Botanique 32: 97–120.
- Porsild, A.E. (1926) Contributions to the Flora of West-Greenland at 70°-71°45´ N. lat. Meddelelser om Grønland vol. 58 (2)
- Porsild, Erling (1936) The Reindeer Industry and the Canadian Eskimo. The Geographical Journal, 88.1: 1–17.
- Porsild, A.E. (1938) Earth mounds in unglaciated arctic northwestern America. The Geographical Review 28: 46–58.
- Porsild, A.E. (1941) A relic flora on sand dunes from the Champlain Sea in the Ottawa Valley. The Canadian Field-Naturalist 55: 66–72. Full text
- Porsild, A.E. (1943) Materials for a flora of the continental Northwest Territories of Canada. Sargentia 4: 1–79.
- Porsild, A.E. (1945) Mammals of the Mackenzie Delta. Canadian Field-Naturalist 59: 4–22.
- Porsild, A.E. (1950) Vascular plants of Nueltin Lake, Northwest Territories. National Museum of Canada Bulletin 118: 72–83.
- Porsild, A.E. (1951) Botany of Southeastern Yukon adjacent to the Canol Road. Bulletin / National Museum of Canada vol. 121 (also Biological series / National Museum of Canada vol. 41), 400 pp.
- Porsild, A.E. (1951) Plant life in the Arctic. Canadian Geographical Journal 42: 120–145.
- Porsild, A.E. (1951) A biological exploration of Banks and Victoria Islands. National Museum of Canada Bulletin 123: 133–138 (reprinted from Arctic Circular, 1950).
- Porsild, A.E. (1953) Edible plants of the Arctic. Illustrated by Dagny Tande Lid. The Arctic 6: 15–34. Full text
- Porsild, A.E. (1955) The vascular plants of the Western Canadian Arctic archipelago. Bulletin / National Museum of Canada vol. 135 (also Biological series / National Museum of Canada vol. 45), 226 pp.
- Porsild, A.E. (1957) Illustrated Flora of the Canadian Arctic Archipelago. Illustrated by Dagny Tande Lid. Bulletin / National Museum of Canada vol. 146. 209 pp.
- Porsild, A.E. 1958. Geographical distribution of some elements in the flora of Canada. Geographical Bulletin 11: 57–77.
- Porsild, A.E. 1963. Stellaria longipes Goldie and its allies in North America. National Museum of Canada Bulletin 186: 1–35.
- Porsild, A.E. 1964. Illustrated flora of the Canadian Arctic Archipelago (2nd edition, revised). National Museum of Canada Bulletin 146: 1–218.
- Porsild, A. E. 1965. Some new or critical vascular plants of Alaska and Yukon. Canadian Field-Naturalist 79: 79–90.
- Porsild, A. E. 1966. Contributions to the flora of southwestern Yukon Territory. National Museum of Canada Bulletin 216: 1–86.
- Porsild, A.E., C.R. Harington & G.A. Mulligan (1967) Lupinus arcticus Wats. grown from seeds of Pleistocene age. Science 158 (3797): 113–114.
- Porsild, A.E. and W.J. Cody. (1968) Checklist of the vascular plants of continental Northwest Territories, Canada. Canada Department of Agriculture, Ottawa. 102 pp.
- Cody, W.J. and A.E. Porsild. (1968) Additions to the flora of continental Northwest Territories, Canada. Canadian Field-Naturalist 82: 263–275.
- Porsild, A. E. 1974. Materials for a flora of central Yukon Territory. National Museums of Canada, National Museum of Natural Sciences, Publications in Botany, No. 4. 77 pp.
- Porsild, A.E. (1974) Rocky Mountain wild flowers. Illustrated by Dagny Tande Lid. Ottawa, National Museum of Natural Sciences, 454 pp.
- Porsild A.E. & Cody, William J. (1980) Vascular plants of continental Northwest Territories, Canada. Ottawa, National Museum of Natural Sciences, 667 pp.
