= Qeqertarsuatsiaq Island =

Island in Greenland

Qeqertarsuatsiaq
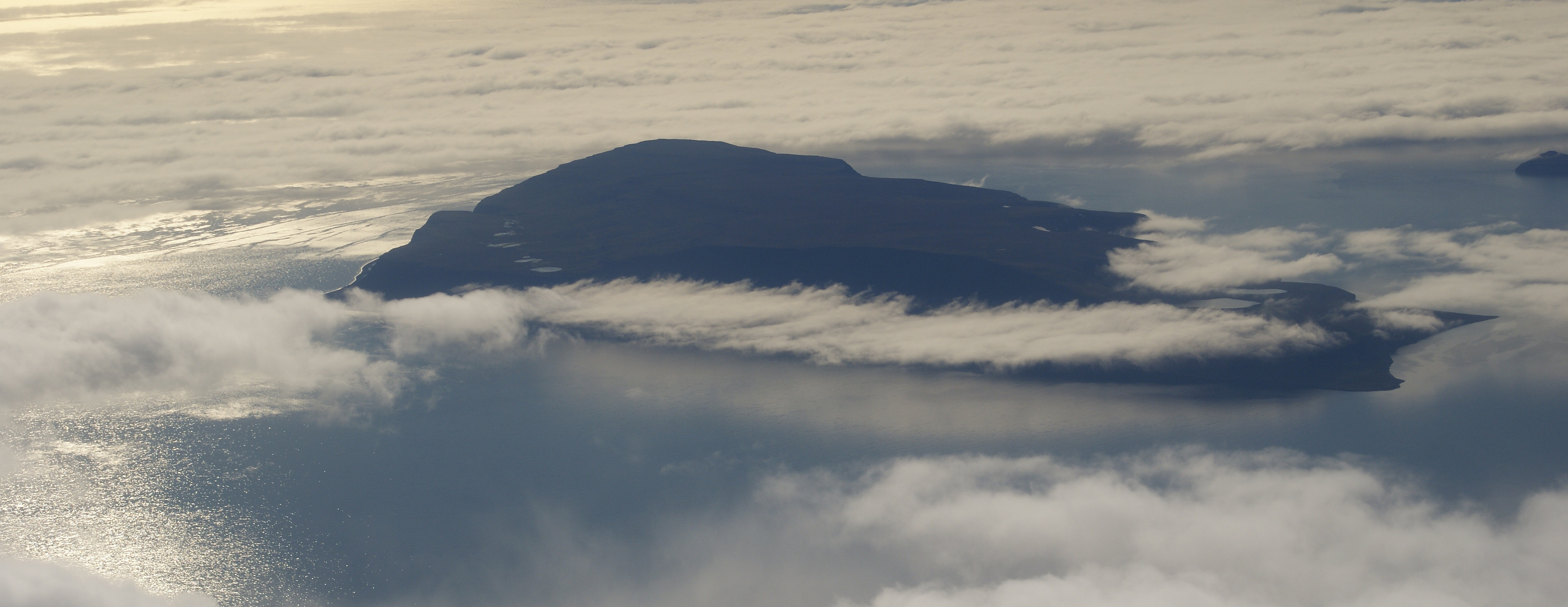
- Aerial view of Qeqertarsuatsiaq Island

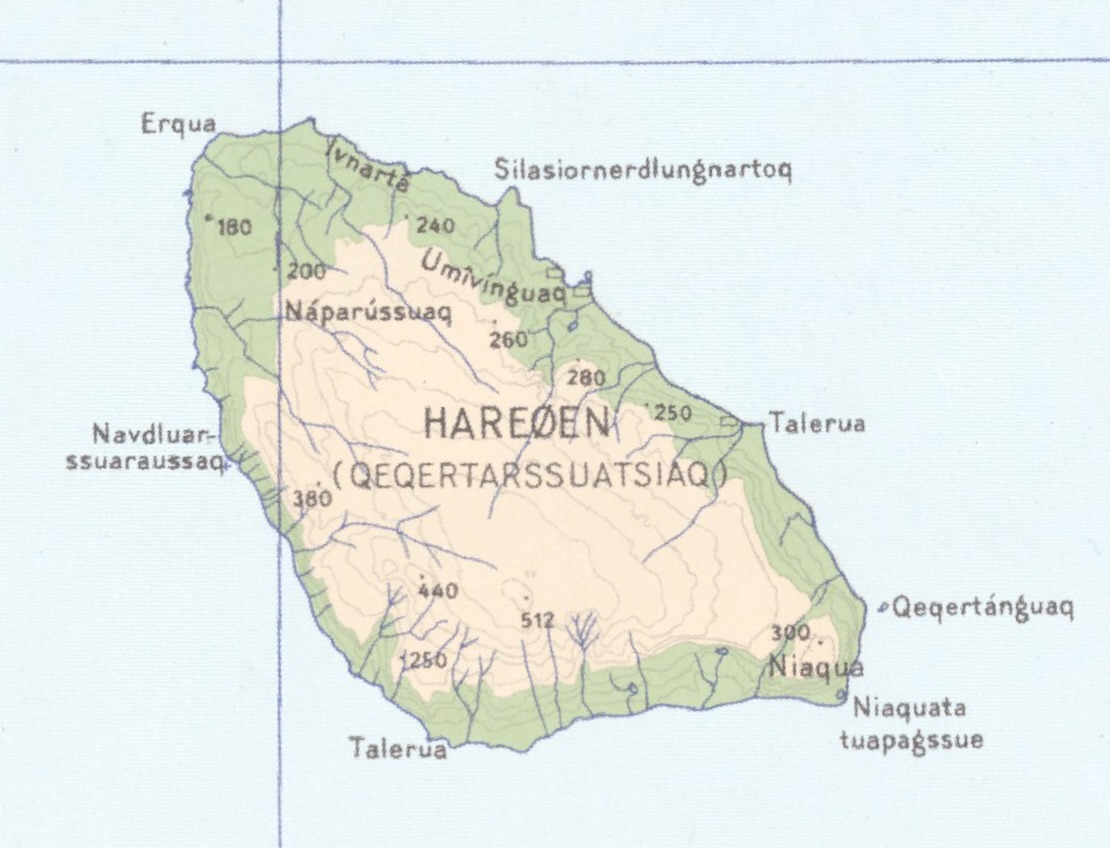
- Topografical map of Qeqertarsuatsiaq

- Location within Greenland

Geography
- Location: Baffin Bay
- Coordinates: 70°25′00″N 54°53′00″W
- Area: 109.3 km^{2} (42.2 sq mi)

Administration
- Greenland
- Municipality: Avannaata

Demographics
- Population: 0

Qeqertarsuatsiaq Island (old spelling: Qeqertarssuatsiaq, Danish: Hareøen) is an isolated and uninhabited island in the Avannaata municipality, in Baffin Bay off the western shore of Greenland. The island is currently uninhabited, but a small number of ruins and graves are evidence of previous inhabitants.

== Flora ==
J. Taylor visited the island during his voyages from 1856-61 and notes a number of species. Nathorst too have visited the island and made observations on the flora on August 10 1883. A more complete account of the vascular plant flora of the island was done by Morten Pedersen Porsild, who was manager of Arctic Station the time, when he explored the island in 1910 and his son. The flora at that time consisted of 112 taxa of vascular plants.

== Geography ==
Qeqertarsuatsiaaq Island is separated from the much larger Disko Island (Greenlandic: Qeqertarsuaq) in the southeast by the Maligaat sound, and from Nuussuaq Peninsula in the northeast by the Sullorsuaq Strait.
