= Frants Henningsen =

Danish painter, illustrator, and professor

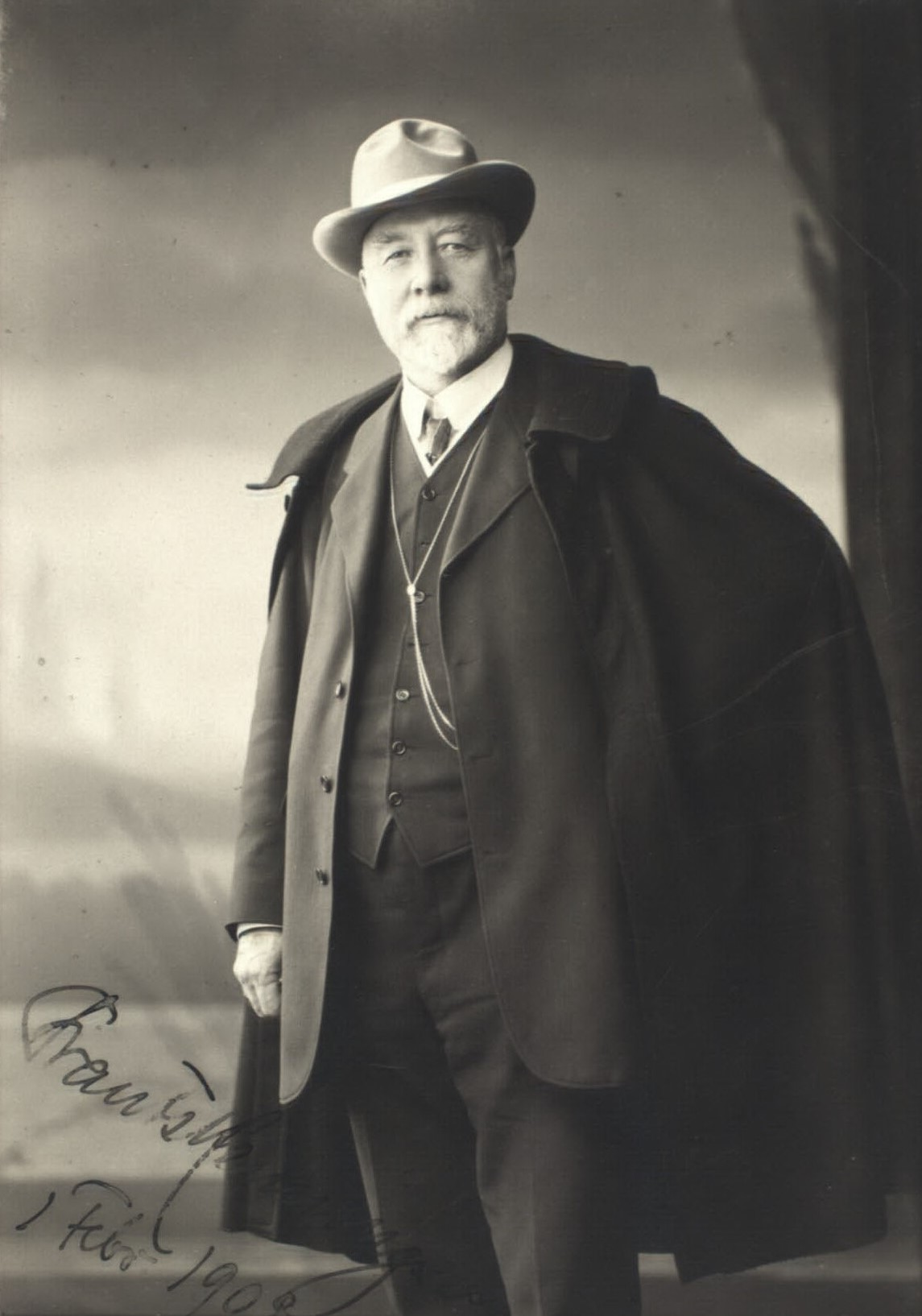
Frants Henningsen in February 1908, as photographed by Peter Elfelt.

Frants Peter Diderik Henningsen (22 June 1850, Copenhagen – 20 March 1908, Copenhagen) was a Danish painter, illustrator and professor. His paintings depict unfortunate occurrences in the lives of middle-class people living in Copenhagen during difficult times. His connections with Denmark's more traditional, realist school encouraged criticism from many of his more reactionary contemporaries, especially Karl Madsen who objected to his appointment as a professor at the Academy in 1887. Erik Henningsen, also an artist, was his younger brother.

== Biography ==
After graduating from Borgerdyd School in Christianshavn, Henningsen attended C.V. Nielsen's drawing school and then attended the Danish Academy where he successfully completed his studies in 1875. From 1877 to 1878, he studied at Léon Bonnat's school in Paris. In 1878, he travelled to Spain together with Peder Severin Krøyer, Frans Schwartz and Julius Lange.

== Artistic style ==
The first painting he exhibited was a portrait of the actress Julie Sødring in 1874, after which he exhibited virtually every year at the Charlottenborg Spring Exhibition held at the Charlottenborg Palace. Despite his studies under Bonnat, he remained a rather traditional, though diligent and careful artist, portraying everything from portraits, genre works, and landscapes to animal paintings and illustrations. His painting of En Begravelse (A Funeral) (1883) shows how he had mastered the use of colour from the Spanish school, for example Diego Velázquez. His dark tones and a deep, dull black are not unlike Édouard Manet and the early works of Krøyer. His interest in compassion rather than beautification can be seen in his masterpiece of an abandoned mother in Forladt. Dog ej af Venner i Nøden (Deserted. But not by Friends in Need).

== Selected works ==
- På fodtur (1877)
- Tørvepige (1878)
- Strandparti, Hornbæk (1883)
- En begravelse (1883)
- Sommerdag ved Hornbæk strand (1884)
- Aftenstemning, sæden køres ind (1886)
- Forladt, dog ej af venner i nøden (1888)
- Vandrebogen efterses (1890)
- Hos pantelåneren (1893)
- Ved sygelejet (1896)
- En helt fra 1864 (1901)
- Portræt af skuespilleren Olaf Poulsen

== Gallery ==
A Funeral (1883)

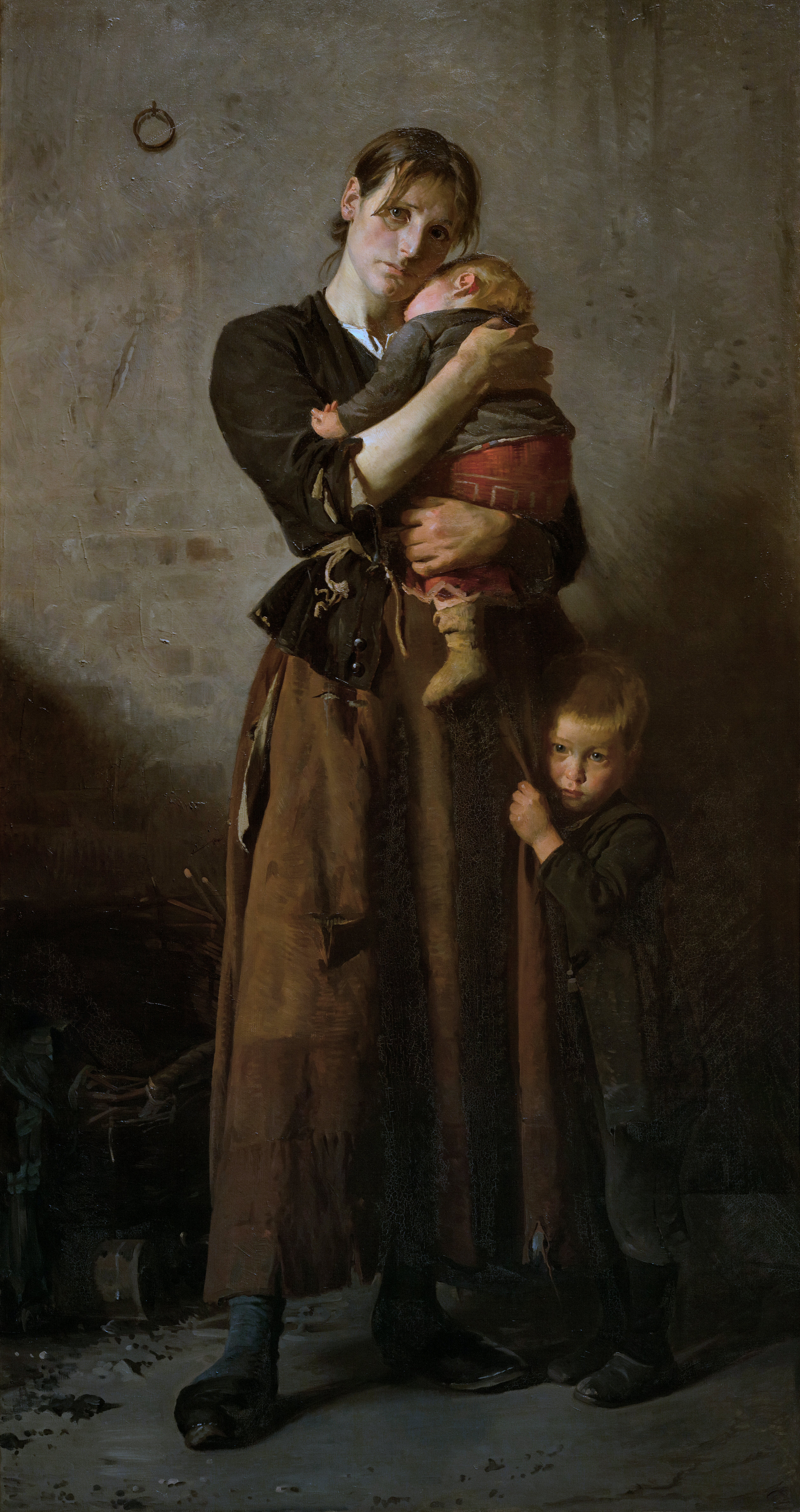
Abandoned (1888)

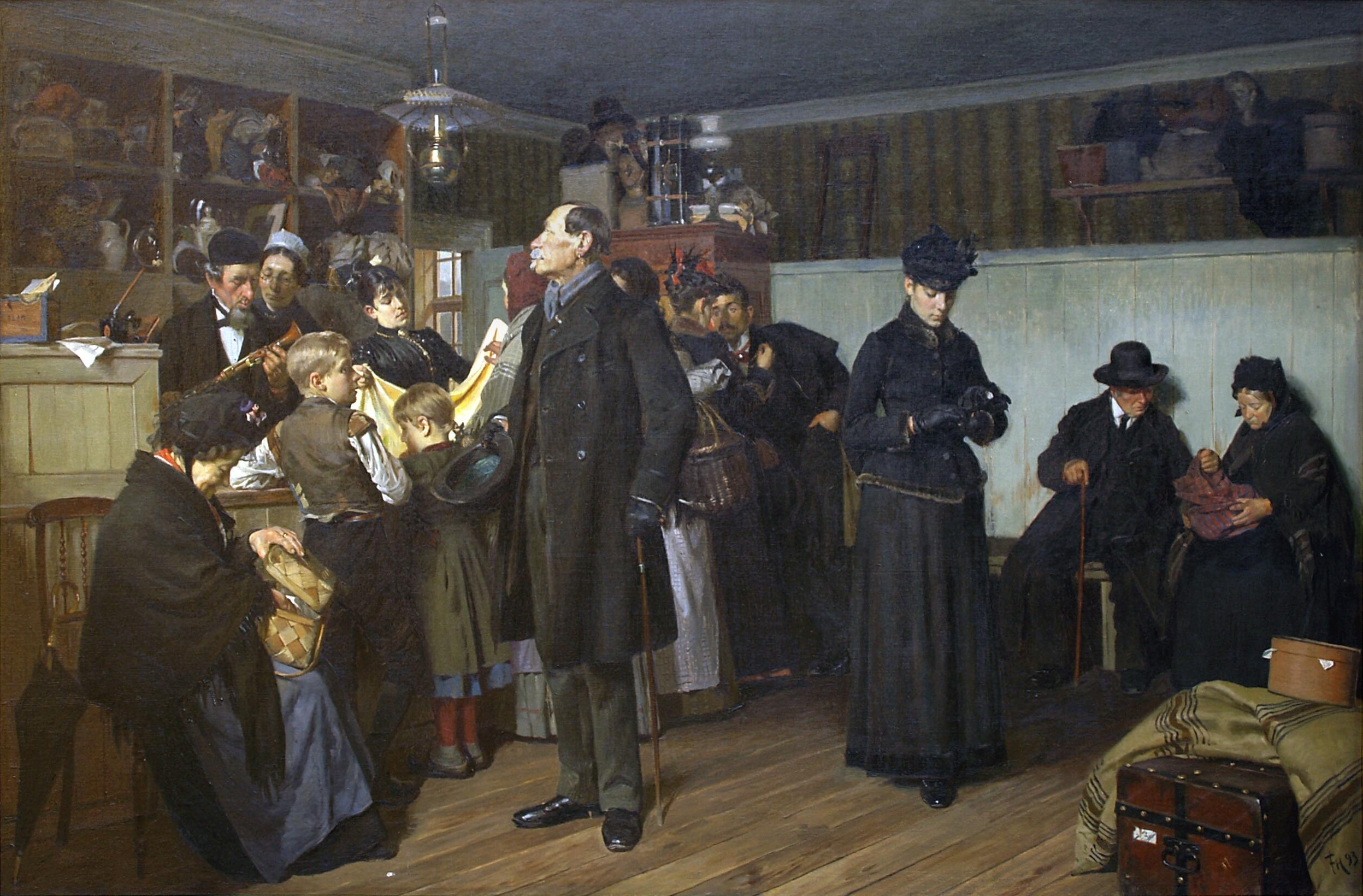
At the pawnbroker (1893)

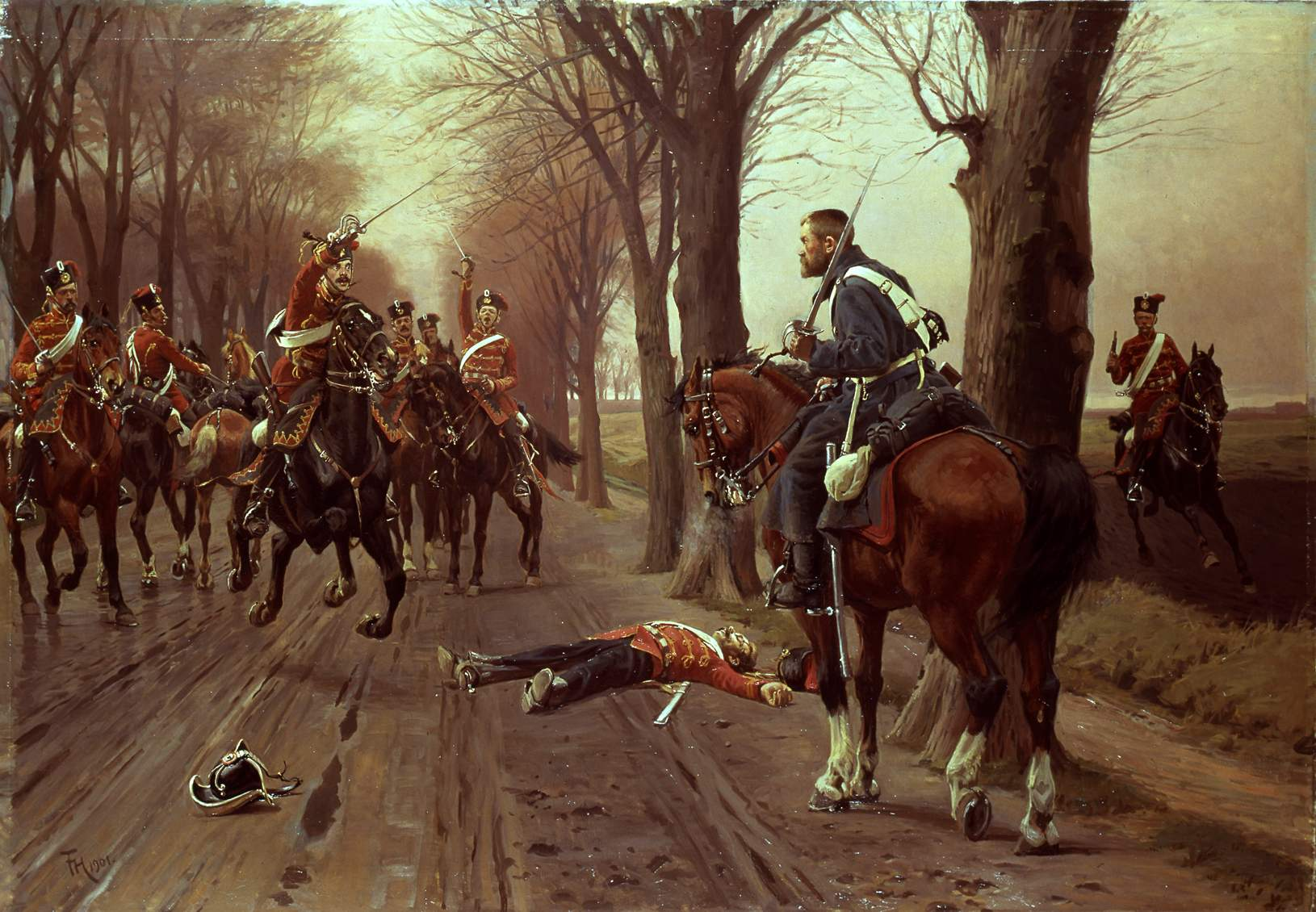
A Hero from 1864 (1901)

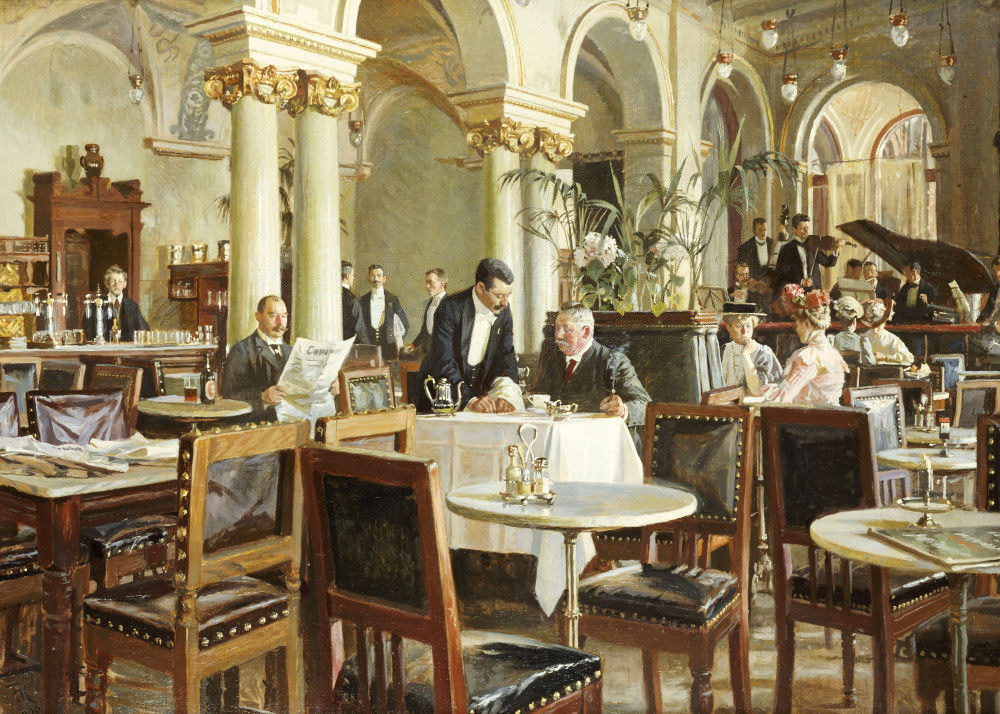
A Café in Copenhagen (1906)

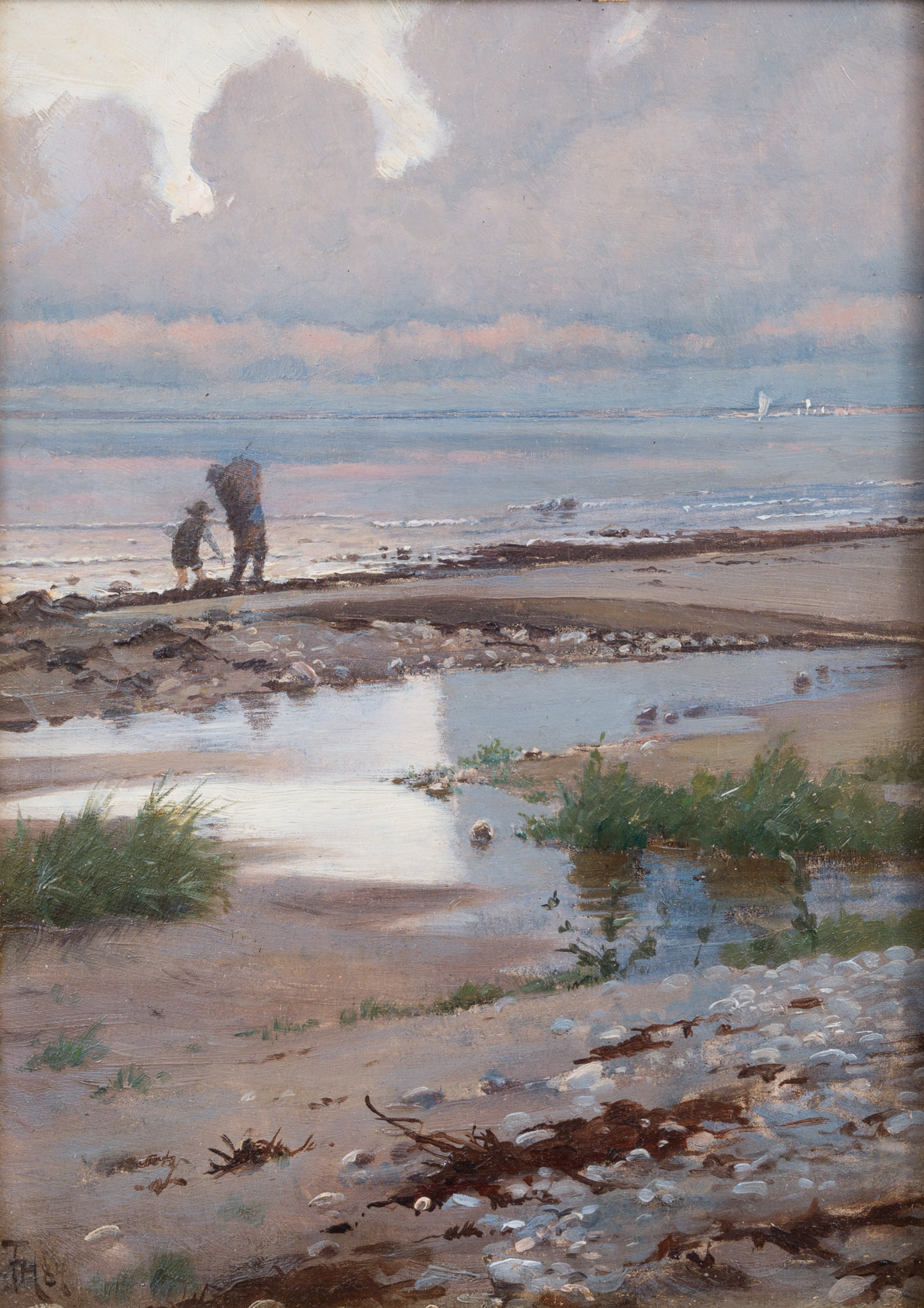
A Summer's Day on Hornbæk Beach, 1884

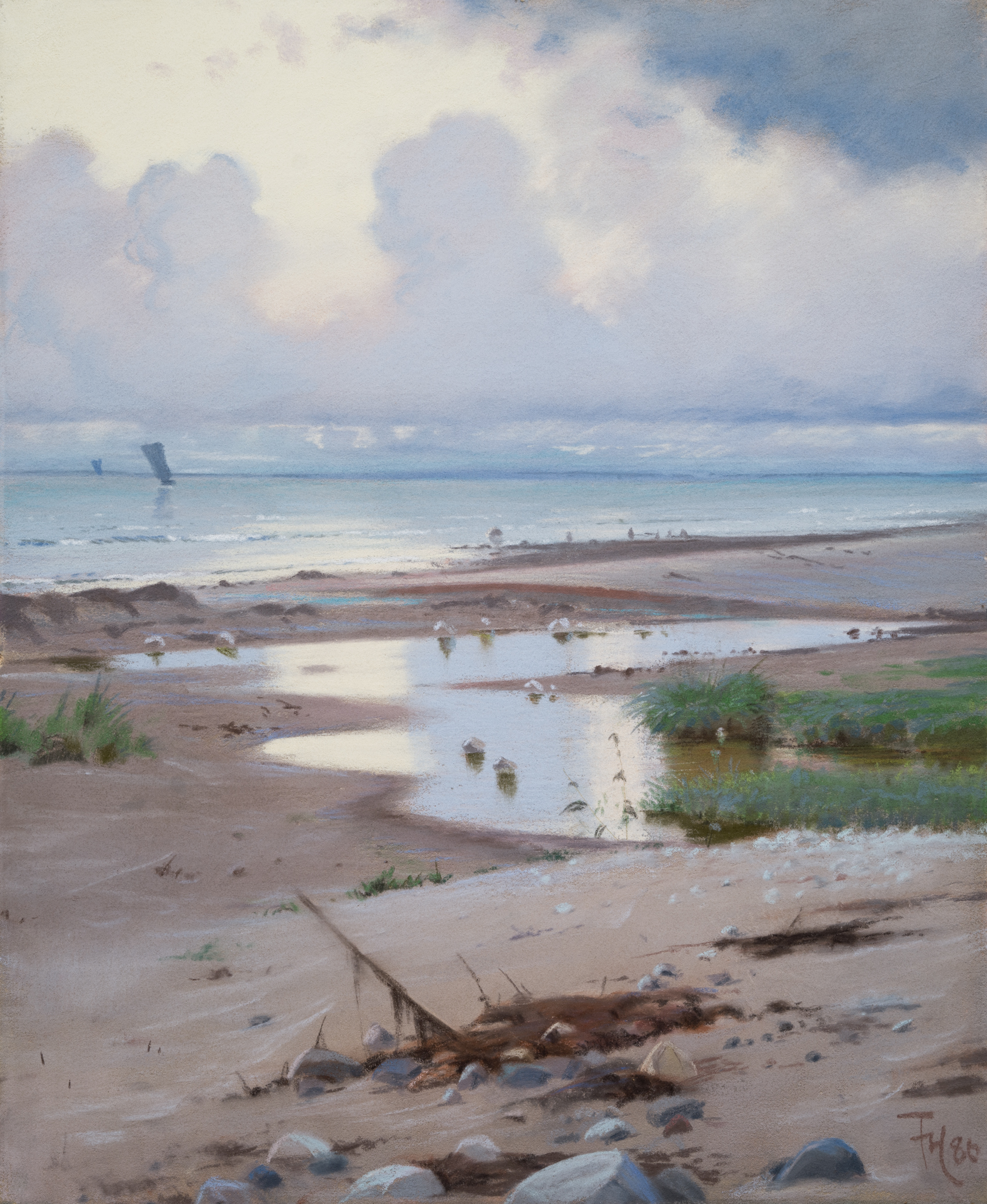
A Summer's Day on Hornbæk Beach, 1886
