= Scandinavian Scientist Conference =

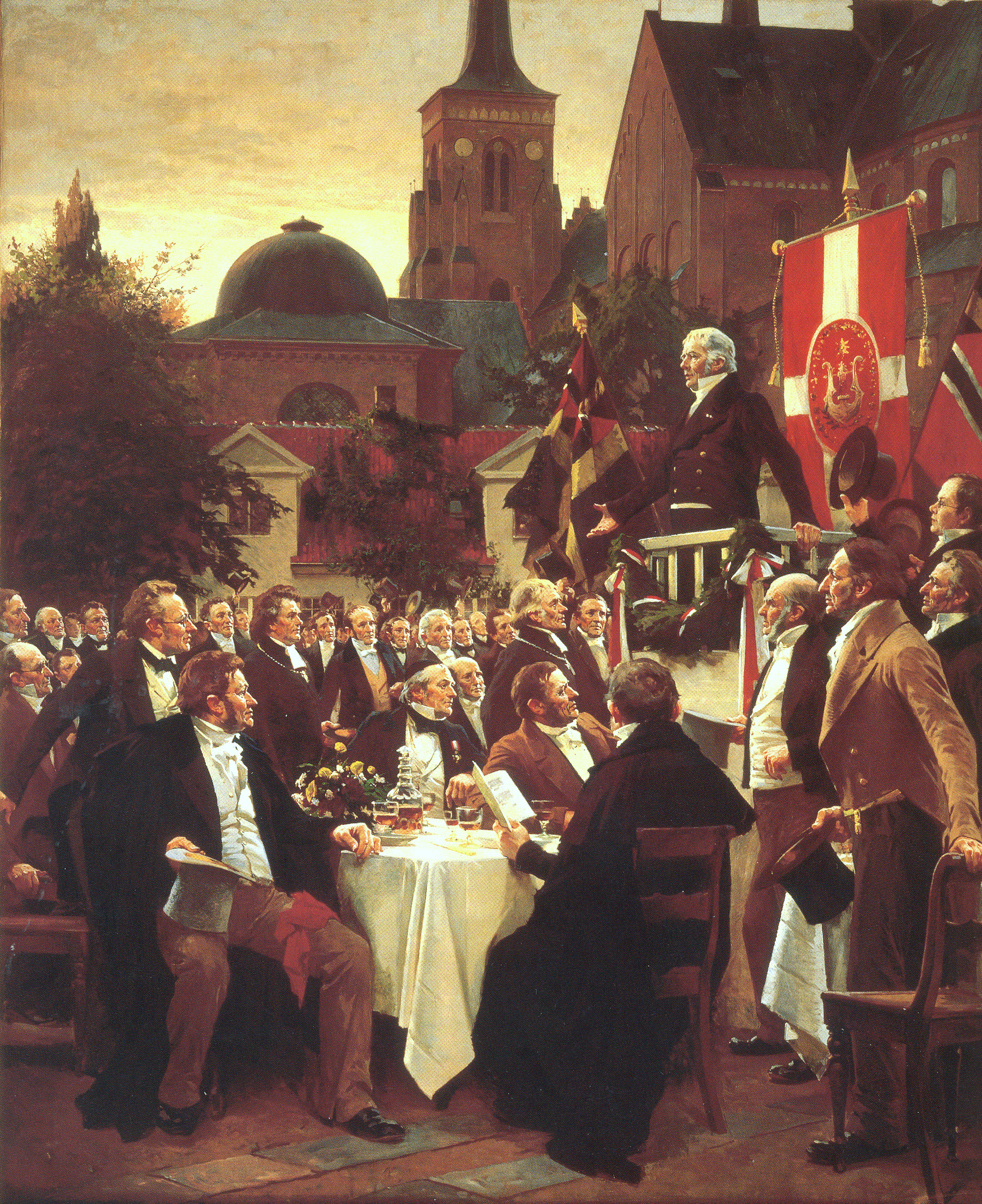
The banquet at the 1847 meeting, held in Roskilde. The president of the meeting Hans Christian Ørsted is speaking. Christopher Hansteen, who presided the 1844 meeting in Oslo, is standing right in front of the speaker. Half-way standing to the left is Japetus Steenstrup. Wall painting by Erik Henningsen in the aula of the University of Copenhagen.

The Scandinavian Scientist Conferences (Nordiske Naturforskermøde/Nordiska Naturforskarmöte or Naturforskerselskabet/Naturforskarsällskapet, English:Scandinavian Association of Naturalists) was a series of meetings 1839–1936 for scientists and physicists from Denmark, Norway and Sweden, later also Finland and Iceland, in the era Scandinavism.

== History ==
The scientific community in Scandinavia were small and scattered, but collectively they had by the 1830s attained the critical mass for meeting at conferences. The inspiration came from Germany, where the scientists since 1822 had held conferences to improve communication in the fragmented geopolitical landscape. The creation of the British Association for the Advancement of Science (1831) drew on the same source of inspiration. From the start, the Scandinavian Scientist Conferences became an outlet for important scientific results. However, towards the end of the 19th century, uni-disciplinary conferences and scientific journals became competitors to the Scandinavian conference as vehicle for scientific communication. As the presentations given at the Scandinavian conferences increasingly were summaries of results already published elsewhere, the meetings lost their importance.The early meetings were held every second year, then every third year, and then at increasingly irregular intervals. In the 20th century, only four Scandinavian Scientist Conferences were held, the last in Helsinki 1936.

No.	Year	Venue	No. of participants	Title of printed proceedings	Notable participants
1	1839	Gothenburg; Sweden	92	Förhandlingar vid det af skandinaviska naturforskare och läkare hållna möte i Götheborg år 1839. Götheborg, 1840; 188 pp.	
2	1840	Copenhagen; Denmark	303	Forhandlinger ved de skandinaviske naturforskeres andet möde, der holdtes i Kjöbenhavn fra den 3die til den 9de juli 1840. Kjöbenhavn, J. Jørgensen & Co, 1841; 424 pp.	
3	1842	Stockholm; Sweden	436		
4	1844	Oslo; Norway	176	Forhandlinger ved de skandinaviske naturforskeres fjerde möde i Christiania den 11–18 juli 1844. Christiania, 1847; 434 pp.	Hans Christian Ørsted
5	1847	Copenhagen; Denmark	472	Forhandlinger ved de skandinaviske naturforskeres femte møde, der holdtes i Kiøbenhavn fra den 12te til den 17de juli 1847. Kiøbenhavn, Gyldendalske Boghandel, 1849; 989 pp.	Anders Retzius; Hans Christian Ørsted; Elias Fries; Japetus Steenstrup
6	1851	Stockholm; Sweden	362		
7	1856	Oslo; Norway	246	Forhandlinger ved de skandinaviske naturforskeres syvende möde i Christiania den 12–18 juli 1856. Christiania, Werner, 1857; 658 + 34 pp.	Japetus Steenstrup
8	1860	Copenhagen; Denmark	451	Forhandlinger ved de skandinaviske naturforskeres ottende møde, i Kiøbenhavn fra den 8de til den 14de juli 1860. Kiøbenhavn, Den Gyldendalske Boghandel, 1861; 908 pp.	
9	1863	Stockholm; Sweden	713		
10	1868	Oslo; Norway	368		Eugen Warming; S.M. Jørgensen
11	1873	Copenhagen; Denmark	418	Forhandlinger ved de skandinaviske naturforskeres 11te møde i Kjøbenhavn fra den 3die til den 9de juli 1873. Kjøbenhavn, Schultz, 1874; 725 pp.	Eugen Warming; Jacob Georg Agardh
12	1880	Stockholm; Sweden	734	Förhandlingar vid de Skandinaviska Naturforskarnes Tolfte Möte i Stockholm från den 7:e till den 14:de Juli 1880. Stockholm, 1883.	Eugen Warming
13	1886	Oslo; Norway	450	Forhandlinger ved de skandinaviske naturforskeres trettende möde i Christiania 7.–12. juli 1886. Christiania, Grøndahl, 1887; 194 pp.	
14	1892	Copenhagen; Denmark	563	Beretningen om Forhandlingerne ved de skandinaviske naturforskeres 14. møde i Kjøbenhavn den 4–9. juli 1892. Kjøbenhavn, Ursins eftf., 1892; 683 pp.	Eugen Warming
15	1898	Stockholm; Sweden	585	Förhandlingar vid det 15de Skandinaviska naturforskaremötet i Stockholm den 7–12 juli 1898. Stockholm, Skandinaviska naturforskaremöten, 1899; 415 pp.	Eugen Warming
16	1916	Oslo; Norway	503	Forhandlinger ved de Skandinaviske naturforskeres 16. møte i Kristiania den 10.–15. juli 1916. Kristiania, 1918	J.N.F. Wille (chair); Eugen Warming; Niels Bjerrum; Lennart von Post; Kaj Birket-Smith; Johannes Brøndsted; Johannes Fibiger; Knud Jessen; Wilhelm Johannsen; Carl Wesenberg-Lund; Astrid Cleve; G.E. Du Rietz; Hanna Resvoll-Holmsen; Thekla Resvoll; Svante Arrhenius; Otto Nordenskiöld
17	1923	Gothenburg; Sweden		Förhandlingar vid det 17de Skandinaviska naturforskaremötet i Göteborg den 9–14 juli 1923. Göteborg, Wettergren & Kerber, 1925; 339 pp.	
18	1929	Copenhagen; Denmark		Beretning om det 18. Skandinaviske Naturforskermøde i København 26.–31. August 1929". Frederiksberg Bogtrykkeri, København; 551 s.	Lars Onsager; Harald Sverdrup
19	1936	Helsinki; Finland		Pohjoismainen (19. skandinaavinen) luonnontutkijain kokous, Helsingissä elokuun 11–15 pnä 1936 = Nordiska (19. skandinaviska) naturforskarmötet i Helsingfors den 11–15 augusti 1936. Helsinki, Skandinaviska naturforskaremöten, 1936; 570 pp.	Niels Bohr; Anton F. Bruun; Jens Clausen; Magnus Degerbøl; Knut Fægri; Paul Gelting; Thorvald Sørensen; Ragnar Spärck
