= Washburn Lake (Victoria Island) =

Lake on Victoria Island

- Location within Nunavut Location within Canada
- Coordinates: 70°04′18.01″N 107°17′59.4″W
- Type: lake
- Primary inflows: Lake Tahoe
- Primary outflows: Paliryuak (Surrey) River
- Basin countries: Canada
- Max. length: 48 kilometres (30 mi)
- Max. width: 11 kilometres (6.8 mi)
- Surface area: 113 square miles (290 km^{2})
- Surface elevation: 91 metres (299 ft)

Washburn Lake is a lake on Victoria Island. It is roughly 48 kilometres (30 mi) long and 11 kilometres (6.8 mi) wide, and has a surface elevation of about 91 metres (299 ft) above sea level. The lake has a surface area of about 292 square kilometres (113 sq mi). Slightly to the west lies Lake Tahoe.

It is drained from the Paliryuak (Surrey) River into Wellington Bay.

== History ==
The lake receives its name from Albert Lincoln "Link" Washburn, the American geologist and geomorphologist who did major geological work on Victoria Island. The adjacent lake, "Tahoe Lake" is named after his wife Tahoe Talbot Washburn, who was deeply involved in Arctic exploration with her husband.

The first confirmed visit to the lake was on August 18, 1946, botanist M. E. Oldenburg collected a specimen of Cassiope tetragona. This visit was one year before the lake was named on March 13, 1947.

Botanist, A. Erling Porsild, working with the National Museum of Canada, conducted botanical collecting across Victoria Island. On August 4, 1949, Porsild visited both Tahoe Lake and Washburn Lake and collected plants there. His 1949 expedition visited a huge number of places across Victoria Island, generally spending no more than two days at each location. The collections were incredibly important and they reportedly doubled the number of plant species then known from Victoria Island, bringing the known flora to 201 species at the time.

== Geography ==
Washburn's 1947 work was especially interested in the glacial history of Victoria Island. His geological synthesis concluded that essentially all of Victoria Island had been glaciated during the Pleistocene. He had found evidence such as, smoothed bedrock, glacial striations, eskers, ground moraines, and other glacial deposits around Lake Washburn.

Tahoe Lake(left) and Washburn lake(right)
