= Erik Henningsen =

Danish painter & illustrator (1855–1930)

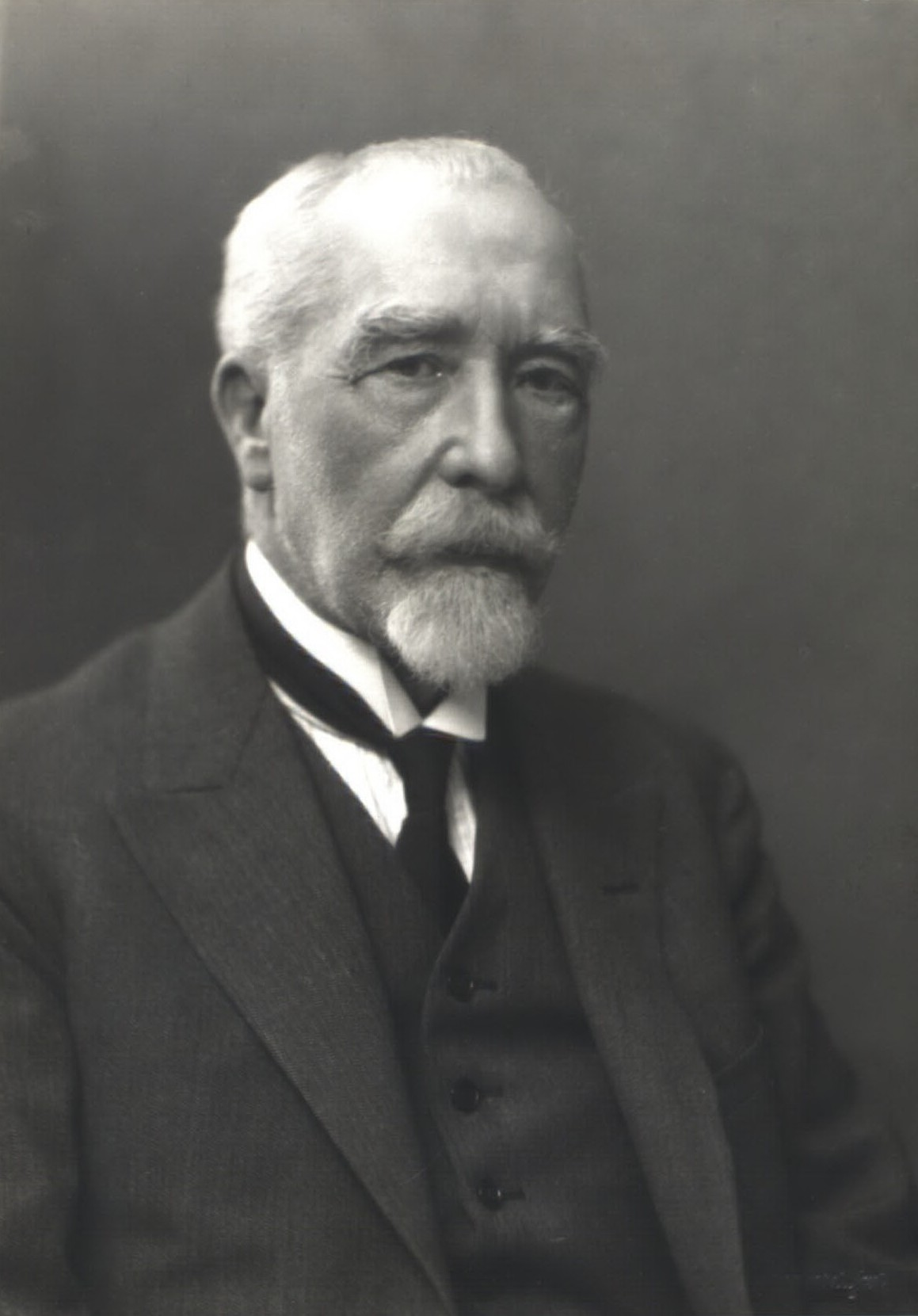
- Henningsen photographed by Peter Elfelt
- Born: 29 August 1855; Hjørring, Denmark
- Died: 28 November 1930 (aged 75); Copenhagen
- Education: Royal Danish Academy of Fine Arts
- Known for: Painting
- Movement: Realism

Erik Ludvig Henningsen (29 August 1855 – 28 November 1930) was a Danish painter and illustrator. He is best known for his Social Realist paintings of poor and exposed groups in the 1880s and 1890s. He was the younger brother of Frants Henningsen who was also a painter.

== Biography ==
Erik Henningsen was born on 29 August 1855 in Copenhagen to Frants Ludvig Henningsen (1820–1869), a grocer, and Hilda Charlotte Christine née Schou (1824–1880). He showed an early artistic talent and was articled to decorative painter A. Hellesen. He also took drawing lessons privately with Christian Nielsen and was admitted to the Royal Danish Academy of Fine Arts in 1873. He graduated in 1877 and won several awards and distinctions, including the academy's Annual Medal in 1887 and 1890, the Ancher Prize in 1889, and in 1892 a travel scholarship of DKK 100.

His travels took him to Germany, Italy, France and the Netherlands.

== Artistic career ==
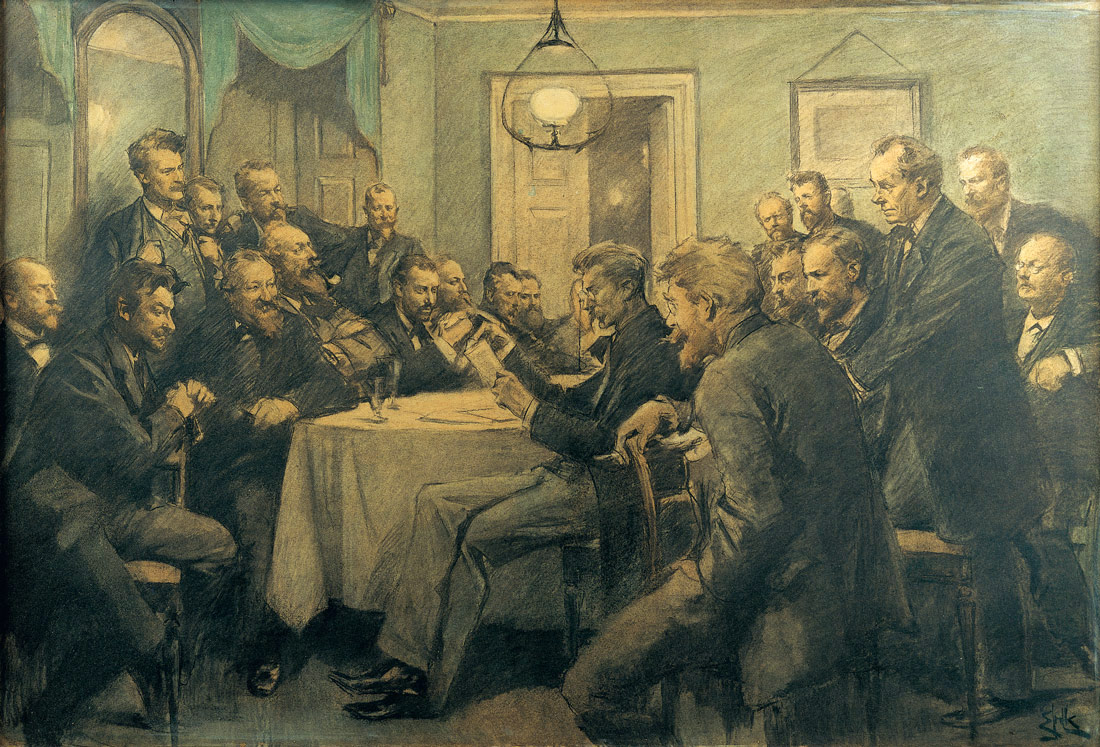
A meeting at Bogstaveligheden on 1 March 1882, drawing by Henningsen from 1910

Henningsen became part of the group Bogstaveligheden, a forum for the Realists' humanitarian ideals about creating a better society through illumination and debate.

In his paintings from the 1880s and 1890s, Henningsen was preoccupied with the rights and living conditions of groups such as the unemployed, women, workers, children and the elderly. Examples are Summum jus, summa injuria. The infanticide (1886, The Hirschsprung Collection and Evicted (1892, Danish National Gallery).

He also depicted the lighter aspects of human life, as in his paintings of street life in Copenhagen.

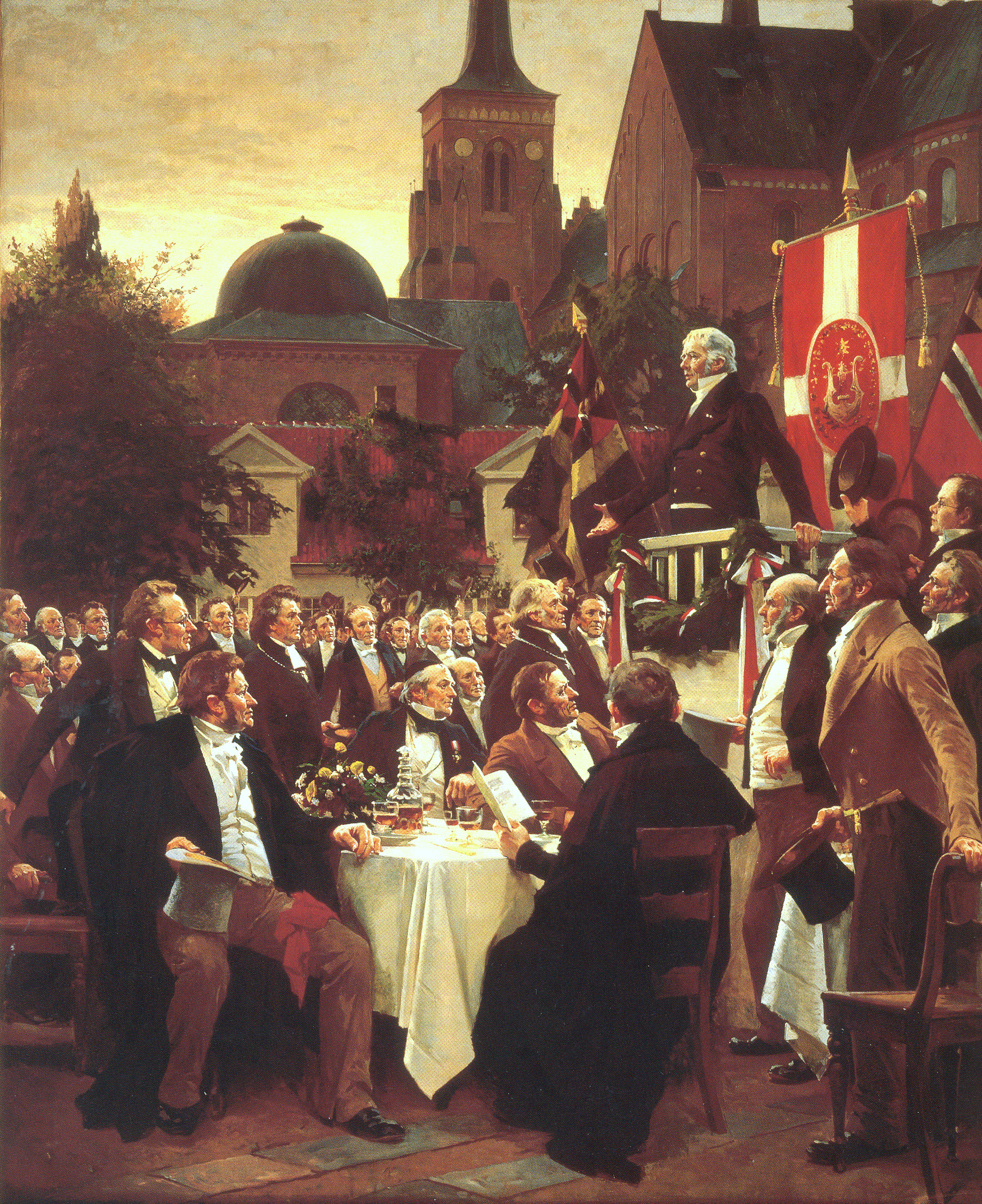
Henningsen's mural in the aula of the University of Copenhagen: Hans Christian Ørsted, the president of the meeting, is speaking. Other people seen in the picture are Christopher Hansteen standing in front of him, and Japetus Steenstrup standing to the left

Towards the turn of the century Henningsen mainly painted historical scenes. An example is his mural in the banquet hall of the University of Copenhagen's main building on Vor Frue Plads in Copenhagen. It depicts the banquet at the Scandinavian Scientist Conference held in Roskilde in 1847. It completed a series of murals depicting the history of the university of which the earlier painting had been created by Vilhelm Marstrand, Carl Bloch and Vilhelm Rosenstand.

During the two first decades of the 20th century he mainly painted genre works from the lives of the bourgeoisie.

== Illustrations and decorative works ==
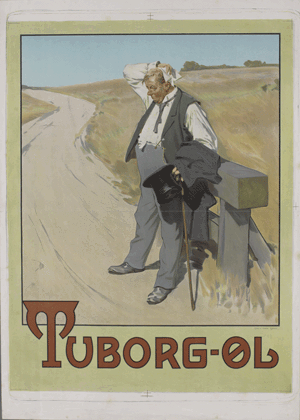
Tuborg poster. The Thirsty Man, 1900

Henningsen also worked as an illustrator, both for the weekly magazine Ude og Hjemme and books such as Pietro Krohns Peters Jul (1914).

In 1900, the Tuborg Breweries announced a competition for a "decorative advertisement poster" to mark its 25 years jubilee. The first prize, which was rewarded with a sum of DKK 10,000, was taken by Jens Ferdinand Willumsen, but it was ultimately Henningsen's entry, known as The Thirsty Man, which was put into production by the brewery. It has since obtained iconic status and become one of the most immediately recognizable posters in Denmark.

== Selected works ==
- Morning in Adressekontorets Gaard (1881)
- A snowy day at Gammeltorv (1886)
- Summum jus, summa injuria. The infanticide (1886, The Hirschsprung Collection)
- Break at Efterslægten School (1887)
- Parade of the Infantry (1888, Danish National Gallery)
- A constitutional celebration in the country (1891)
- Woman at the Grøndalshuset (1892)
- Evicted (1892, Danish National Gallery)
- A wounded worker (1895, Danish National Gallery)
- A lecture in the Dagmar Hall, Askov Folk High School (1903, Ribe Art Museum)

== Gallery ==
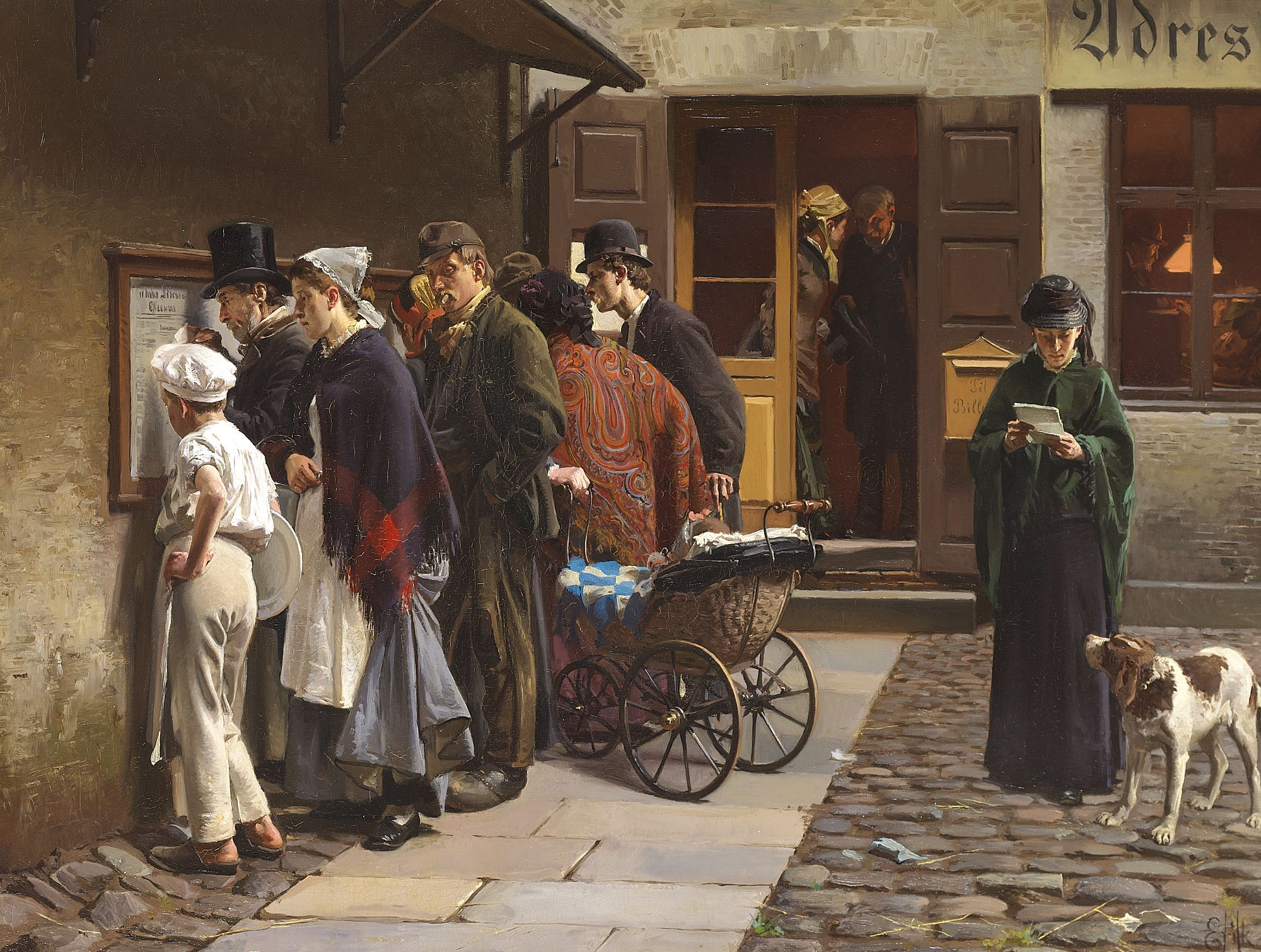
Morning in the courtyard of the Adressecontoir, Copenhagen (1881)

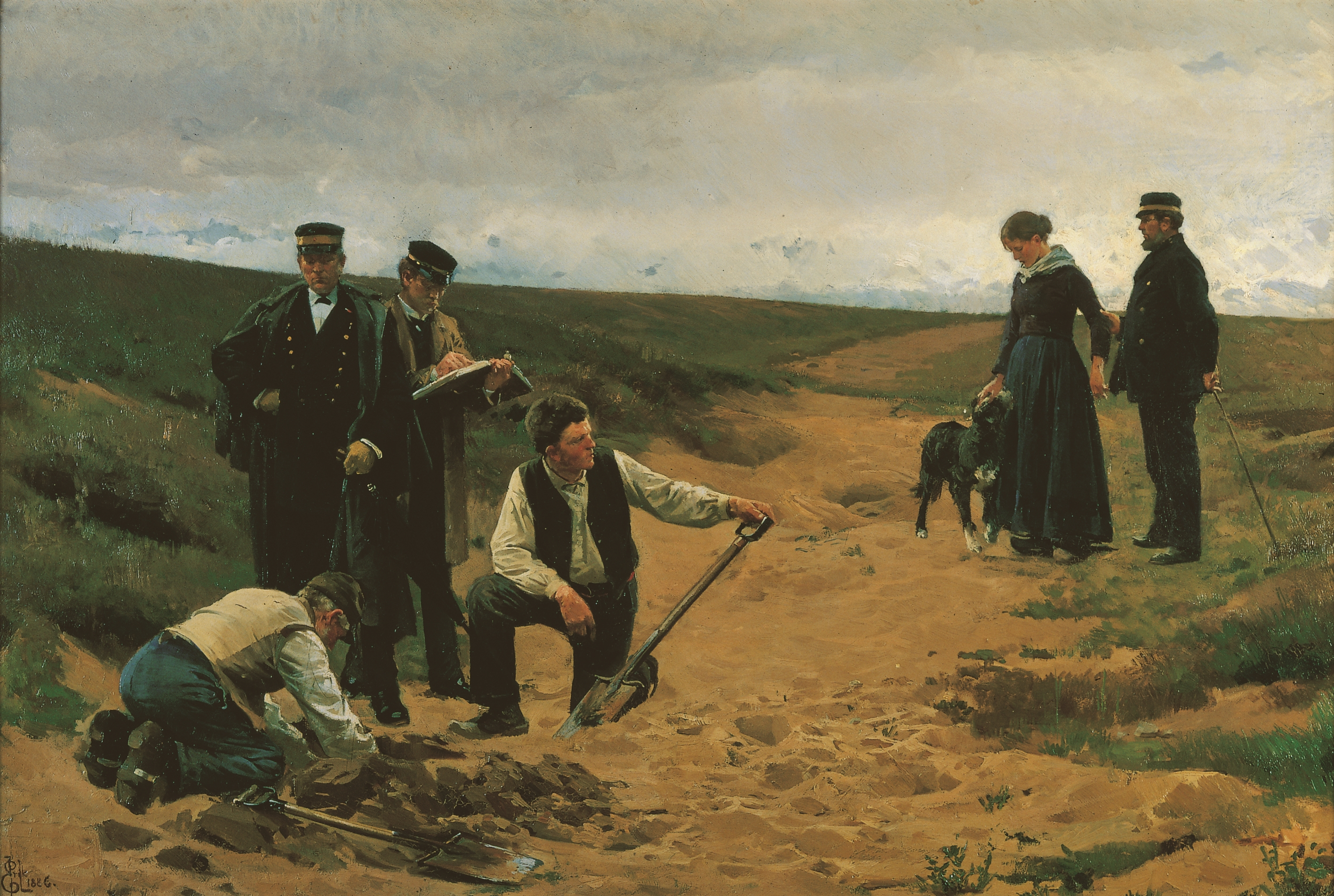
Summum jus, summa injuria. The infanticide (1886)

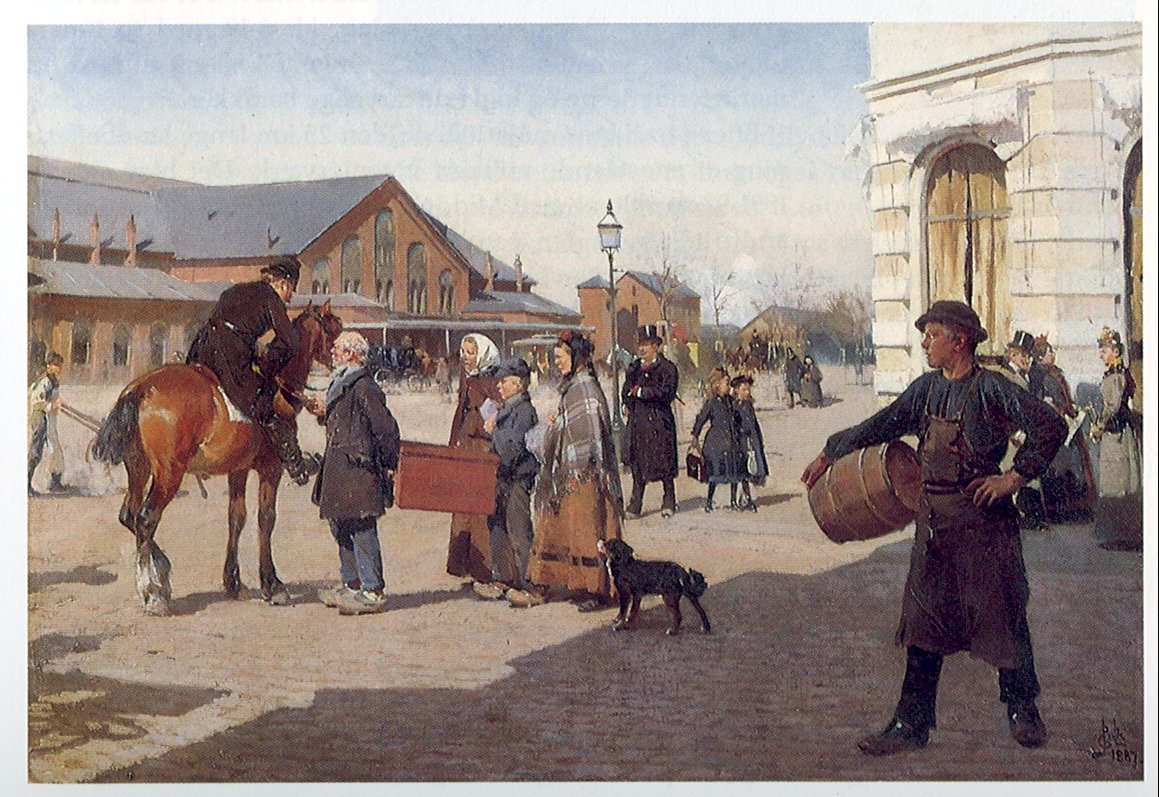
Farmers in the capital (1887)

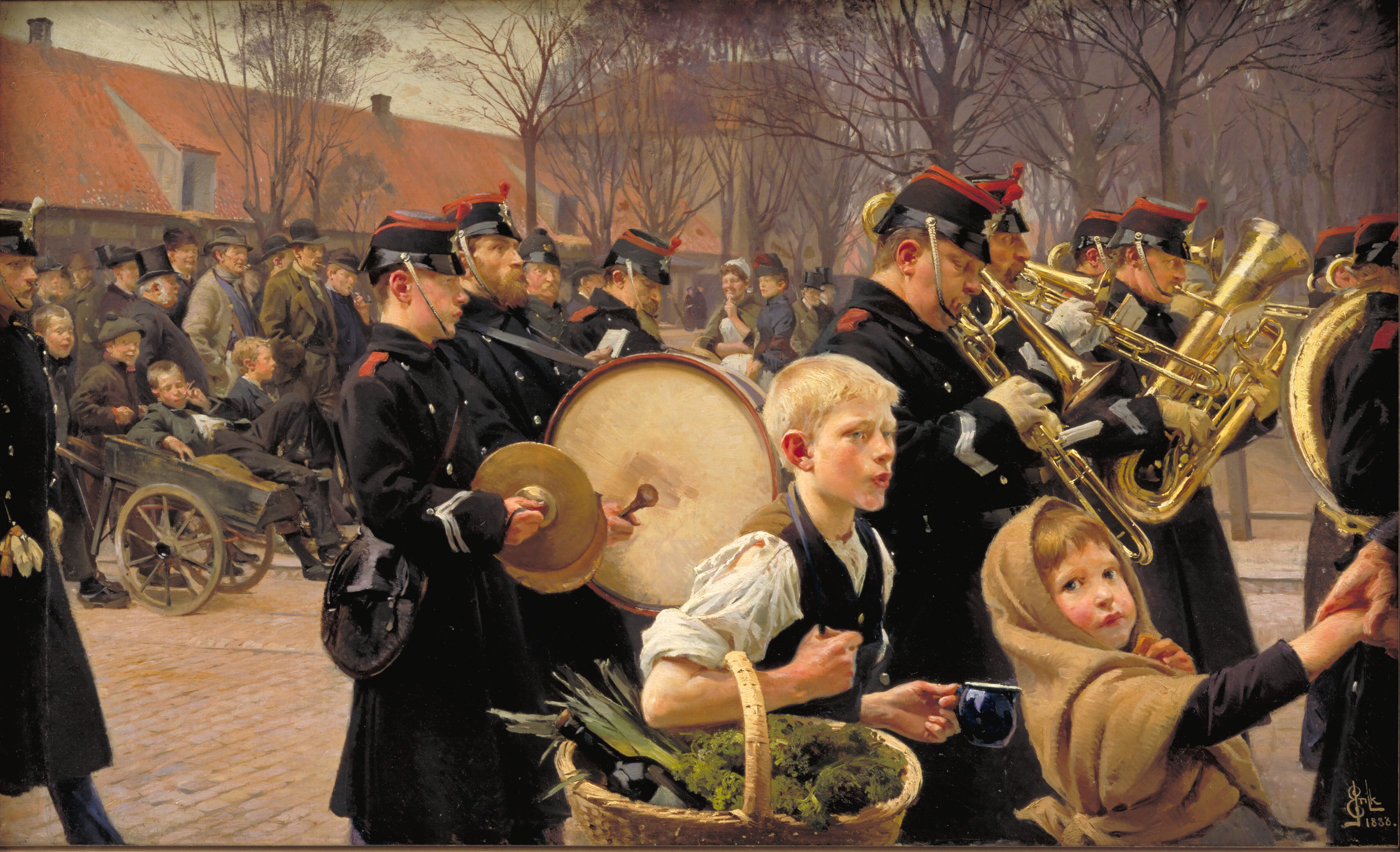
Parade of the Infantry (1888)

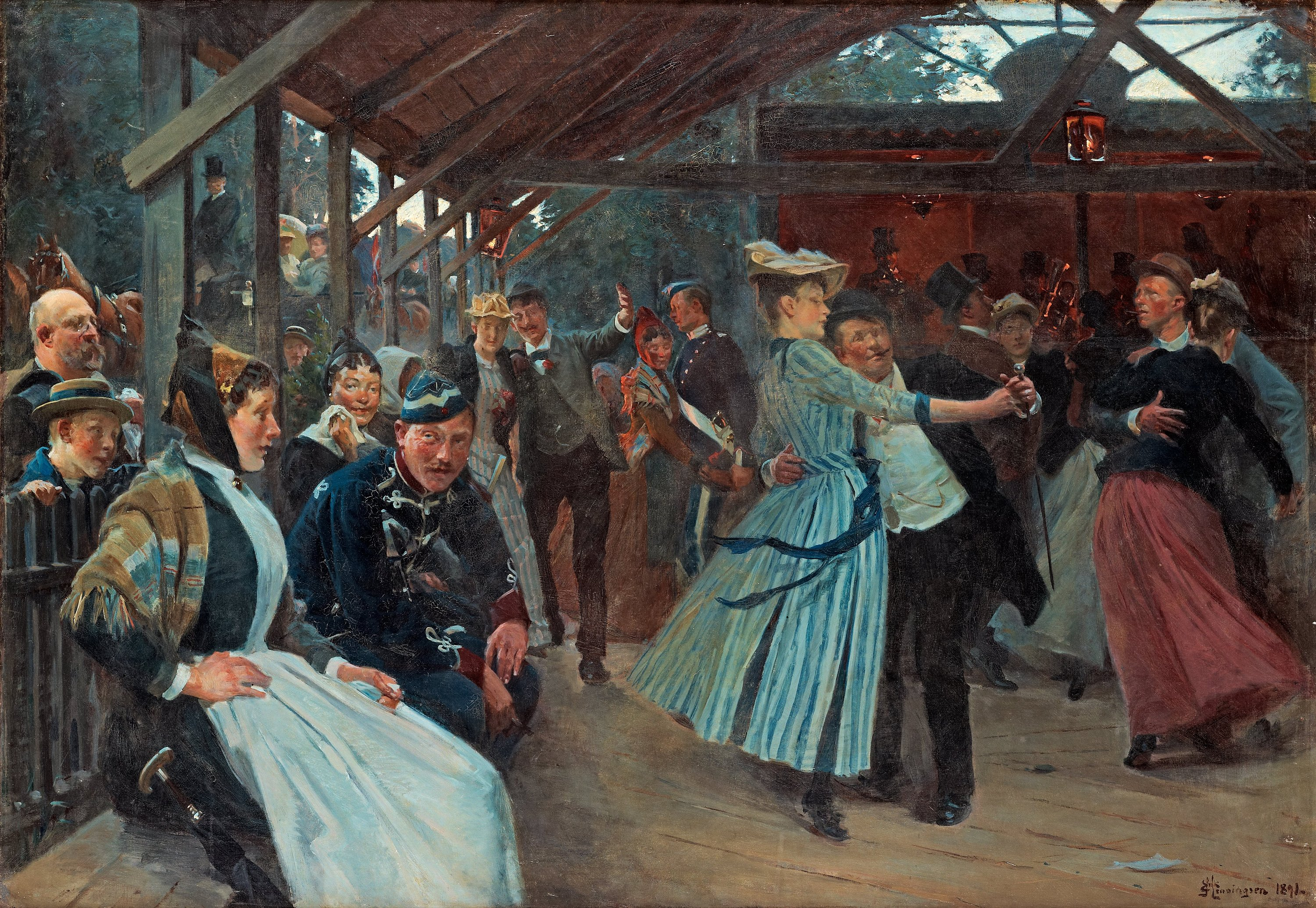
The dance pavilion (1891)

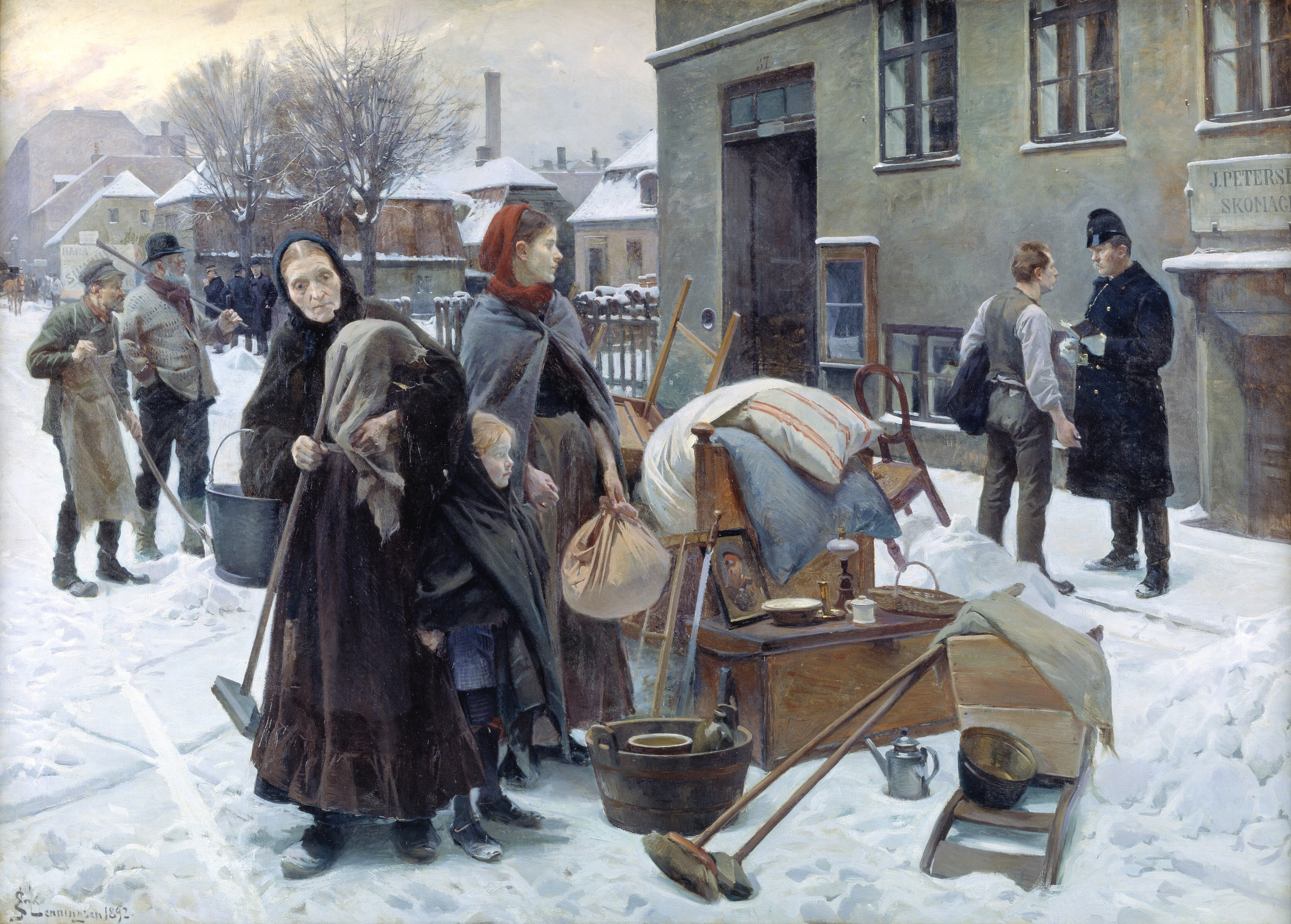
Evicted (1892)

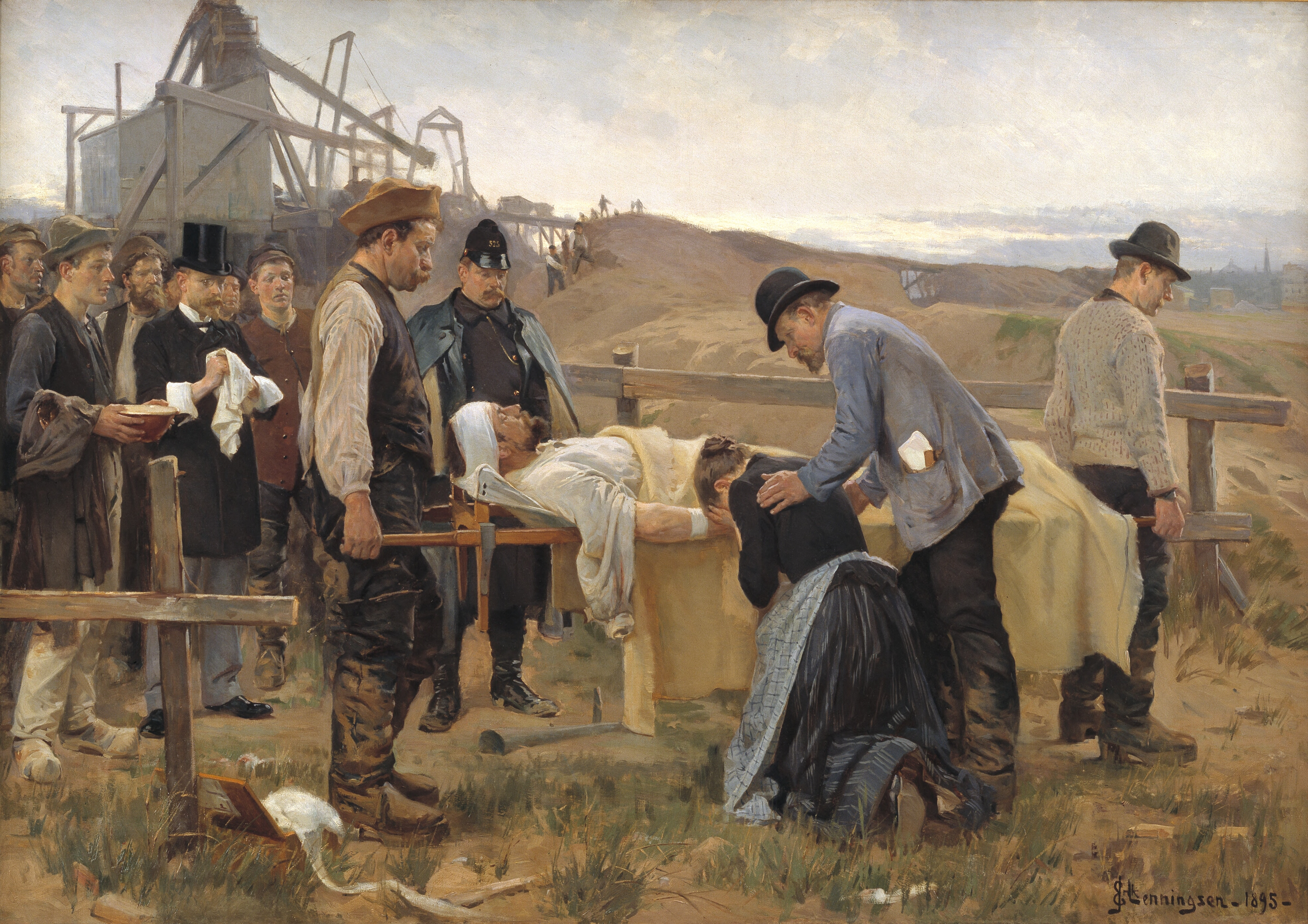
A wounded worker (1895)

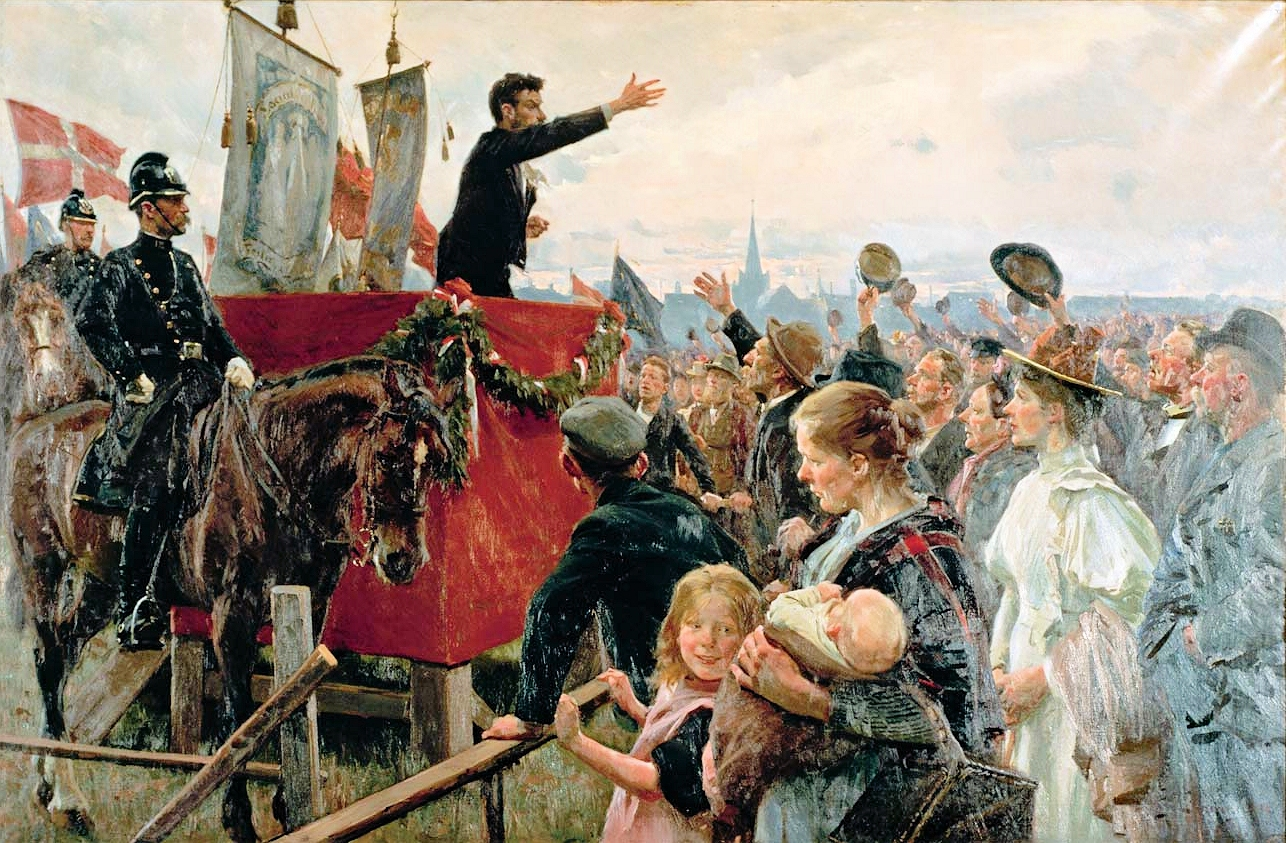
An agitator (1899)

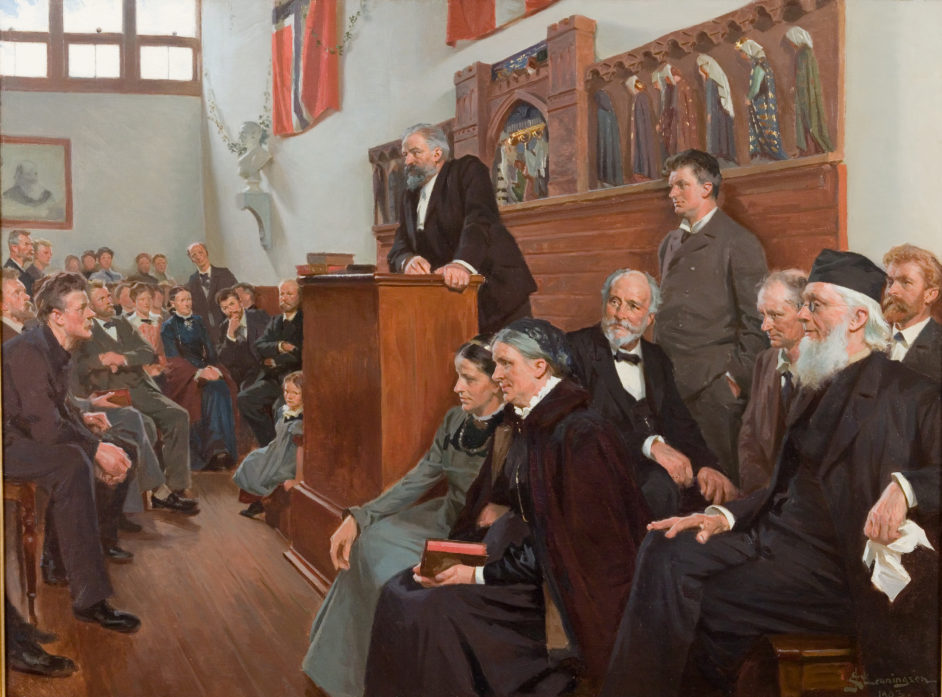
Askov Folk High School (1903)

== See also ==
- Art of Denmark
