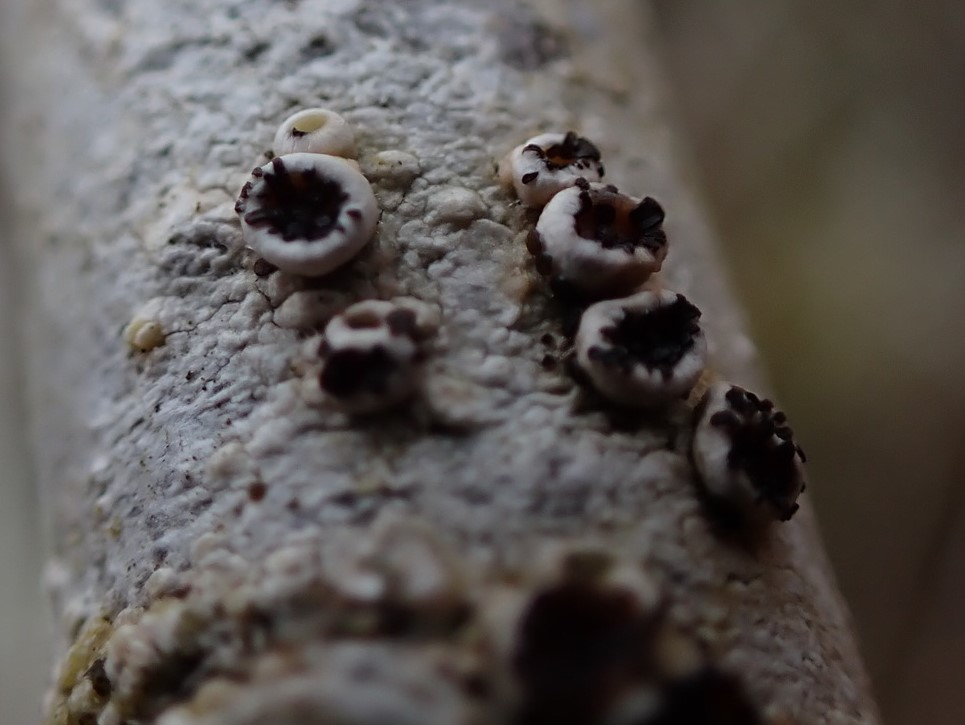

Scientific classification
- Kingdom: Fungi
- Division: Ascomycota
- Class: Leotiomycetes
- Order: Phacidiales
- Family: Helicogoniaceae
- Genus: Geltingia; Alstrup & D.Hawksw. (1990)
- Species: G. associata

Binomial name
- Geltingia associata (Th.Fr.) Alstrup & D.Hawksw. (1990)

Synonyms
- Lecidea associata Th.Fr. (1867); Biatora leptostigma (Nyl.) Walt.Watson (1953); Lecidea associata Th.Fr. (1867); Lecidea leptostigma Nyl. (1868); Leciographa associata (Th.Fr.) Zopf (1896); Lithographa andrewii Stirt. (1878); Nesolechia associata (Th.Fr.) Sacc. & D.Sacc. (1906); Nesolechia leptostigma (Nyl.) Sacc. & D.Sacc. (1906); Xylographa andrewii (Stirt.) Redinger (1938)

= Geltingia =

Genus of fungi

Geltingia is a fungal genus in the family Helicogoniaceae. It is monotypic, containing the single lichenicolous species Geltingia associata. The genus was circumscribed in 1990 by mycologists Vagn Alstrup and David Leslie Hawksworth. The genus name honours Danish scientist Paul Gelting.

It has a circumpolar distribution. It is known to grow on the lichens Ochrolechia frigida, Ochrolechia upsaliensis and Pertusaria.
