= Morten Pedersen Porsild =

Danish botanist

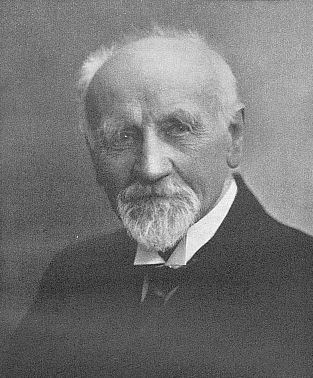
M. P. Porsild on his 80th birthday, 1 September 1952. Photo: Albert Schou jr.

Morten Pedersen Porsild (1 September 1872, Glibstrup near Store Andst – 30 April 1956, Copenhagen) was a Danish botanist who lived and worked most of his adult life in Greenland. He participated in expeditions to Greenland in 1898 and 1902, together with the physiologist August Krogh. In 1906, he founded the Arctic Station in Qeqertarsuaq, West Greenland, since 1956 part of the University of Copenhagen. He got support from famous polar researchers like Knud Rasmussen, Mylius-Erichsen and Fridtjof Nansen. A private person donated the building and running cost were put directly on the Danish state budget. Morten Porsild managed the station for forty years. In 1909 he when on expedition to Qeqertarsuatsiaq (Hare Island) in west Greenland. He received the Hans Egede Medal in 1921. In 1946, he returned to Copenhagen, and was succeeded as station head by Paul Gelting. He was the father of Alf Erling Porsild, Robert Thorbjørn Porsild, Asta Irmelin "Tulle" Egede and Ove Sten Porsild.

Apart from botany, Porsild contributed to zoology and ethnography. He also entered Greenland politics.

== Selected works ==
- Porsild, Morten P. (1910). "Hvor opholder den grønlandske laks sig om vinteren?". Meddelelser om Grønland. 47.
- Porsild, Morten Pedersen (1911). "The Plant-life of Qeqertarsuatsiaq (Hare Island) Off the Coast of West Greenland". Meddelelser om Grønland. 47.
- Porsild, Morten P. (1911) Une arme ancienne de chasse des esquimaux et son analogue de la culture préhistorique de France (An ancient eskimo hunting weapon and its analogue in the prehistoric culture of France). Meddelelser om Grønland 47.
- Porsild, Morten P. (1914) Studies on the material culture of the Eskimo in West Greenland. Meddelelser om Grønland 51 (5).
- Porsild, Morten P. (1915) On the Genus Antennaria in Greenland. Meddelelser om Grønland 51: 267–81.
- Porsild, Morten P. (1918) Om nogle vestgrønlandske patterdyr og fugle; I-II. Meddelelser om Grønland 56 (1918): 29-54
  - Part 1 on wolves, dogs and reindeer, Part 2 on the narwhal.
- Porsild, Morten P. (1918) On "Savssats": A crowding of Arctic animals at holes in the sea ice. Geographical Review 6 (3): 215-228.
- Porsild, Morten P. (1919) Naussut suliarineránut panertíneránutdlo najorĸutagssiaĸ [translated title: Guide to pressing and drying plants]. K’eĸertarssuarme, 6 pp.
- Porsild, Morten P. (assisted by A. Erling Porsild) (1920) The flora of Disko Island and the adjacent coast of West Greenland from 66 to 71 n. lat.: with remarks on phytogeography, ecology, flowering, fructification and hibernation. Meddelelser om Grønland 58 (1-2)
- Porsild, Morten P. (1932) Alien plants and apophytes of Greenland. Meddelelser om Grønland 92 (1), 85 pp.
