= Lake Tahoe (Victoria Island) =

- Location within Nunavut Location within Canada
- Location: Victoria Island (Canada), Kitikmeot Region, Canada
- Coordinates: 69°59′08.5″N 108°34′21.7″W
- Type: lake
- Max. length: 50 kilometres (31 mi)
- Max. width: 5 kilometres (3.1 mi)
- Surface elevation: 87 metres (285 ft)

Lake Tahoe is a lake on Victoria Island. It is roughly 50 kilometres (31 mi) long and 5 kilometres (3.1 mi) wide, and has a surface elevation of roughly 87 metres (285 ft) above sea level. Slightly to its east lies Washburn Lake.

== Visits ==
The first recorded visit to Tahoe Lake was in 1949 by botanist A. Erling Porsild of the National Museum of Canada. Porsild conducted a botanical expedition across Victoria and Banks islands. A modern scientific review of the expedition specifically records that he collected at “Tahoe Lake and Washburn Lake” on August 4, 1949.

There's another documented survey from 1959. A later NWT species-at-risk report summarizes a 1959 aerial survey over the Tahoe Lake area covering approximately 9,930 km². During that survey, researchers reported hearing a wolf howl but did not see wolves.

And a third visit in 2011, Nunavut Research Institute Compendium lists a University of Alberta project with Graham Pearson, five people in the party, and “Tahoe Lake” as the community/research location. The project involved collecting exposed geological material from Victoria Island and studying the age and geological history of the rocks.

== History ==
Tahoe Talbot Washburn, was deeply involved in Arctic exploration with her husband, geologist Albert Lincoln “Linc” Washburn. They studied the landscape, geography, and the plant and animal life of multiple islands in the Canadian Archipelago.

The name "Tahoe Lake" originates from Tahoe Washburn. While on their expedition in the artic she named "Lake Tahoe" after her first name, along with naming an adjacent lake, Lake Washburn, (1 mi east of Lake Tahoe) after her last name. The names were incorporated into the maps in 1952..

A 1952 article in the journal Arctic describes Tahoe Washburn as an important member of the Arctic Institute team and says she accompanied her husband on several northern expeditions. Tahoe Washburn's own memoir, Under Polaris: An Arctic Quest, was based on journals from the couple's fieldwork in the Canadian Arctic, including Victoria Island from 1938 to 1941.

Lake Tahoe was first added to maps in the early 1930's, A historical account of Arctic cartography describes extensive aerial photography of Victoria Island beginning in the 1930s. In 1930, J. L. T. Burwash flew around the island and obtained photographic coverage of the coastline.

== Geography ==
Victoria Island was repeatedly shaped by Pleistocene glaciation, and the island's lakes, valleys and drainage patterns are part of that broader glacial landscape. The entire region was affected by repeated Arctic ice-sheet advances and retreats.

Tahoe Lake sits in a landscape strongly influenced by glacial and periglacial processes, and the region has extensive evidence of past glaciation. Porsild's 1949 observations across Victoria Island repeatedly describe glacial landforms and frost-related landscape processes.

== Images ==
Members of 1 Canadian Ranger Patrol Group practice traditional Inuit games on Exercise VICTORIA RANGER during Operation NUNALIVUT 2015 on April 5, 2015 in Tahoe Lake.

Members of 1 Canadian Ranger Patrol Group practice traditional Inuit games on Exercise VICTORIA RANGER during Operation NUNALIVUT 2015 on April 5, 2015 in Tahoe Lake

A map of Lake Tahoe, to the east lies Lake Washburn
