= Kangerluk =

Settlement in Greenland

Kangerluk Diskofjord
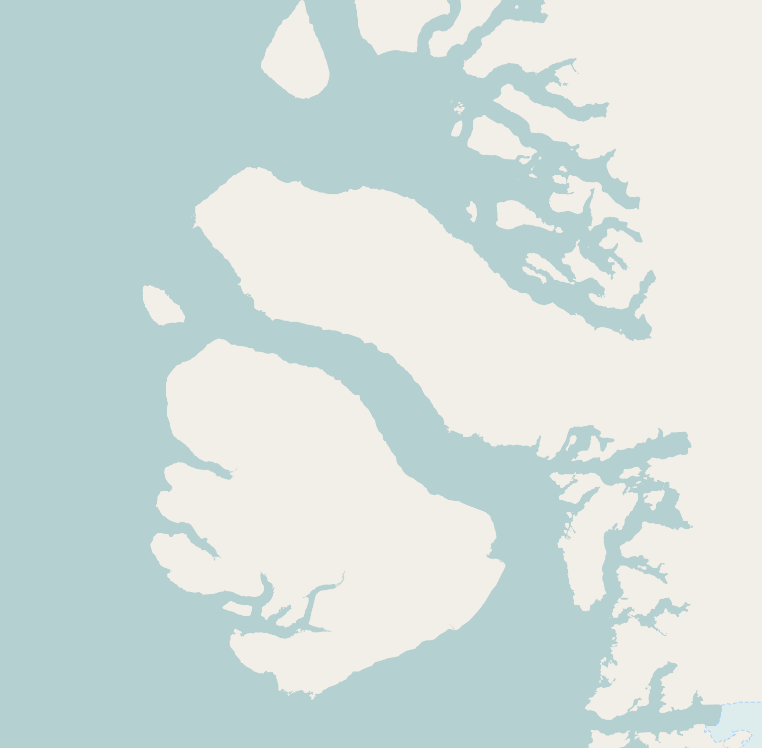
- Location within Greenland Kangerluk (Greenland)
- Coordinates: 69°29′04″N 53°56′55″W
- State: Kingdom of Denmark
- Constituent country: Greenland
- Municipality: Qeqertalik

Population (2025)
  - Total: 4
- Time zone: UTC−02:00 (Western Greenland Time)
  - Summer (DST): UTC−01:00 (Western Greenland Summer Time)
- Postal code: 3953 Qeqertarsuaq

Kangerluk (Danish: Diskofjord) is a slightly remote settlement in the Qeqertalik municipality in western Greenland. It is located on the southwestern shore of Disko Island along with the island's biggest settlement, Qeqertarsuaq, on the southern shore. It is situated approximately 35 km (22 mi) northwest of Qeqertarsuaq.

Along with Qeqertarsuaq, Kangerluk is currently one of two remaining settlements on Disko Island. It is in the largest fjord system on the island which it is named after. Its original name was Kangerluarssuk after the fjord arm where the settlement is situated. The settlement has been more or less inhabited since the beginning of the 19th century. As of 2025, only 4 inhabitants currently live in the area.

== Population ==
Kangerluk is rapidly depopulating, having lost 88% of its population since 2010.

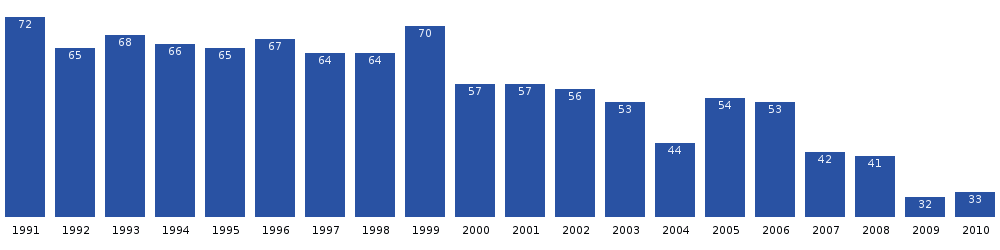
Kangerluk population growth dynamics in the last two decades. Source: Statistics Greenland
