= University of Copenhagen Arctic Station =

Research facility in Greenland

Coordinates: 69°15′12.1″N 53°31′02.6″W

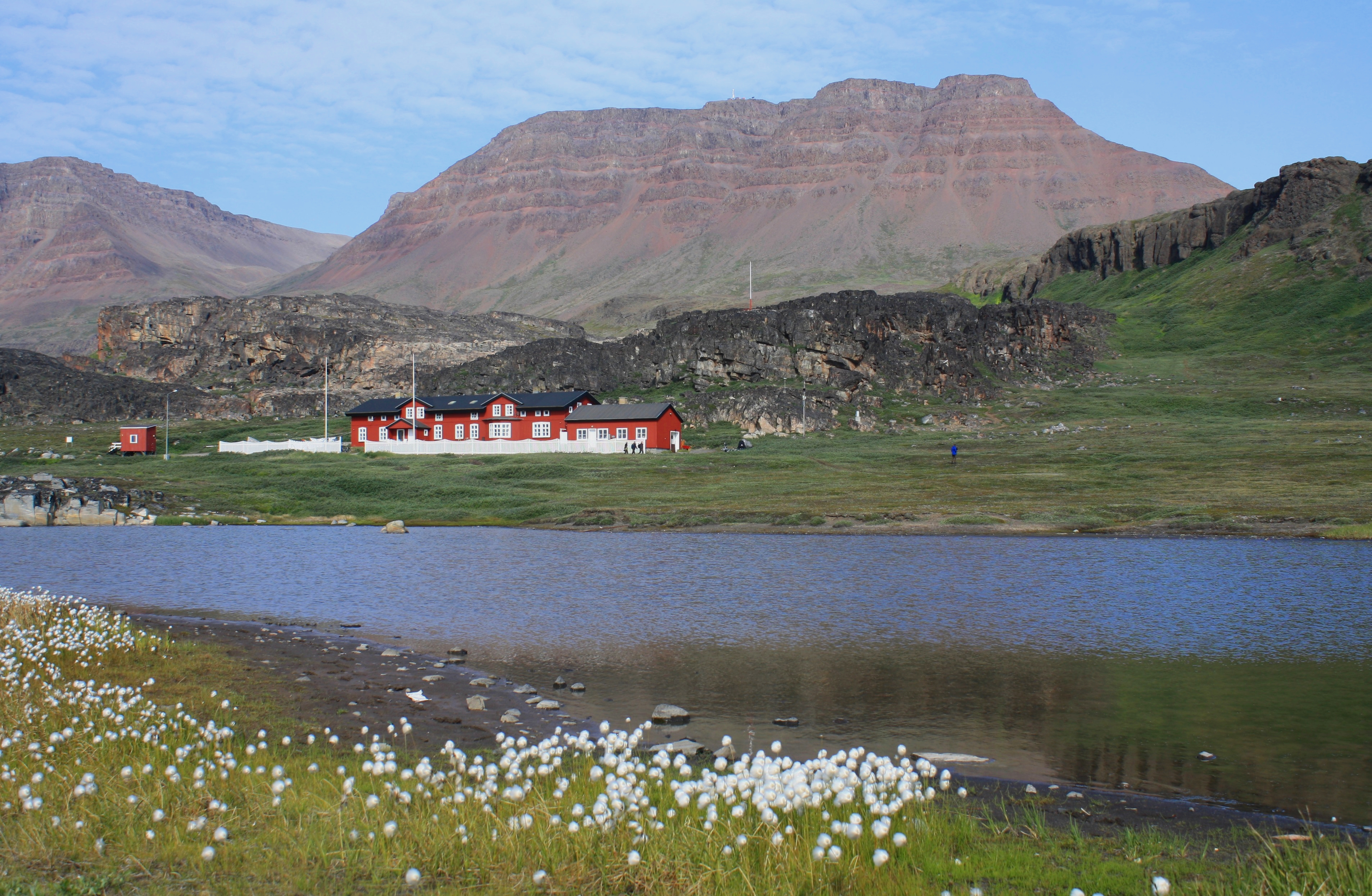
Arctic Station in 2014

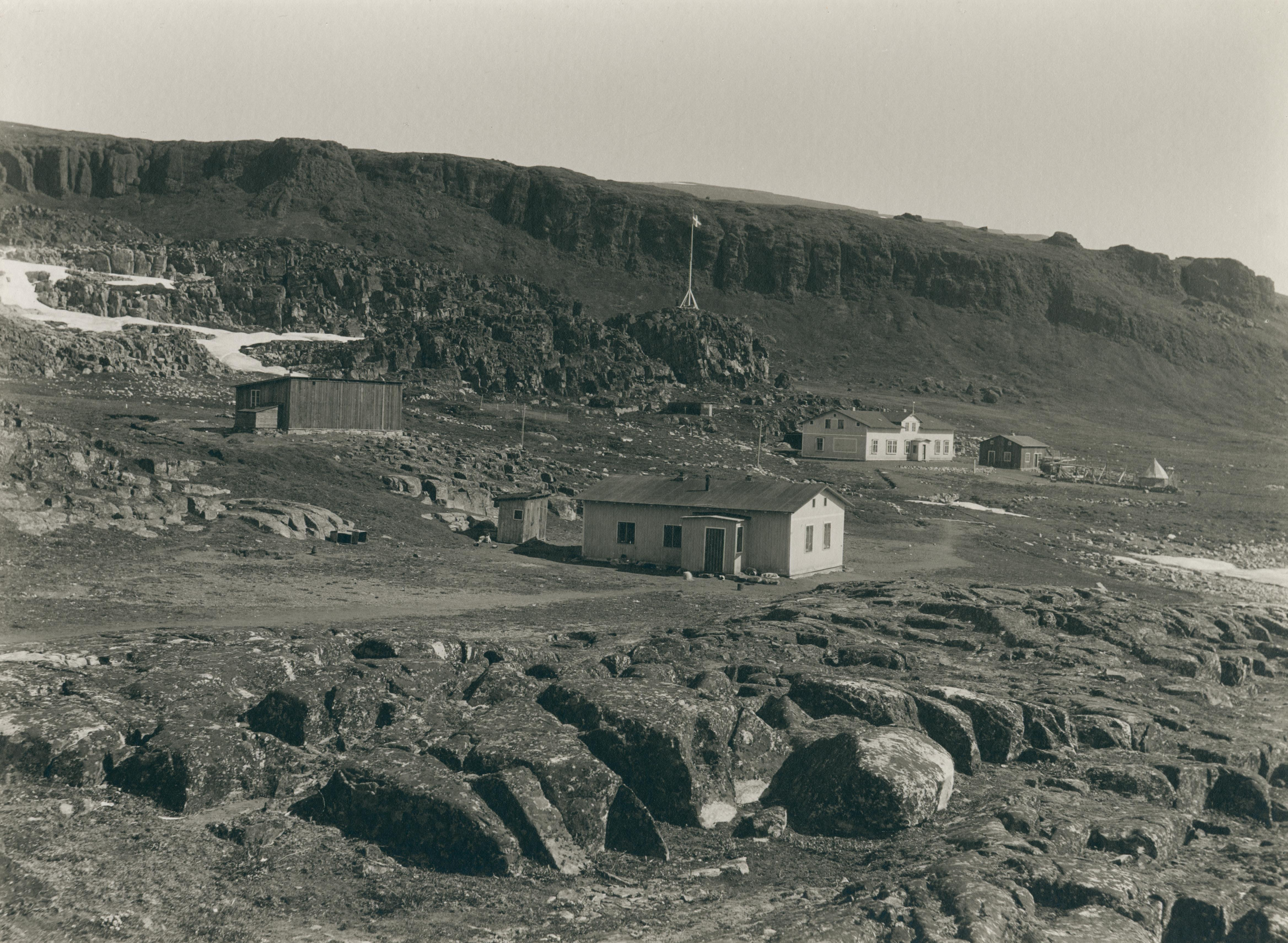
Arktisk Station (c.1909)

University of Copenhagen Arctic Station (Greenlandic: Københavns Universitetimi Arktisk Station; Danish: Københavns Universitets Arktiske Station) is a year-round, environmental research facility in central West Greenland. Located about 300 metres (980 ft) northeast of Qeqertarsuaq, it faces Disko Bay and the Davis Strait on the south coast of Disko Island with the Blæsedalen valley to the north. The main building and the laboratory are within a nature sanctuary. It was founded in 1906 by the botanist Morten Pedersen Porsild, and has since 1953 been owned by the University of Copenhagen Faculty of Science.

The facility was renovated and expanded in the years 2019 - 2022 by Dissing+Weitling. The modernisation included new laboratories, storing facilities and extra sleeping accommodation for 39 people in total.

== See also ==
- List of research stations in the Arctic
