= Kaj Birket-Smith =

Danish philologist and anthropologist

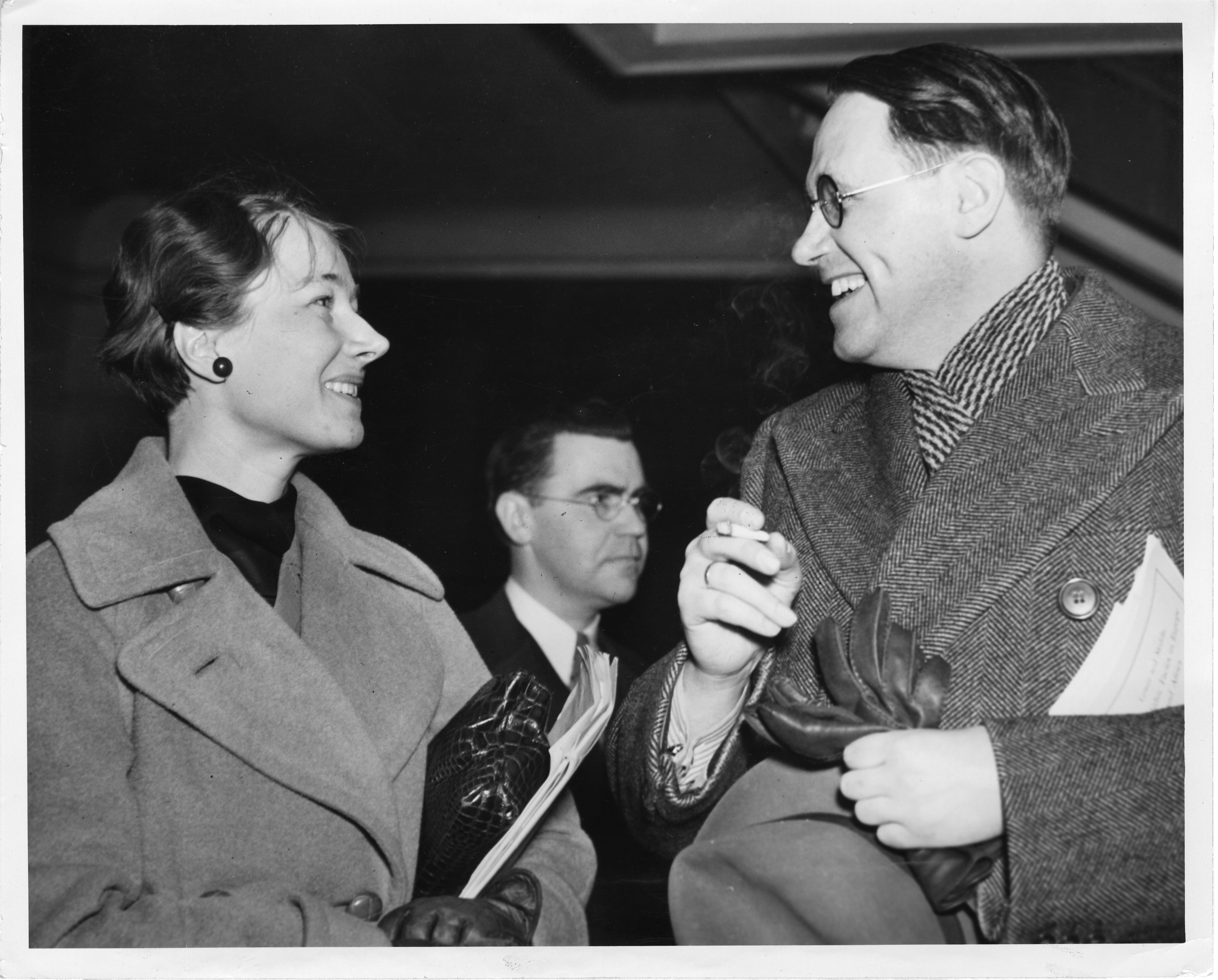
Anthropologist Frederica Annis Lopez de Leo de Laguna (1906–2004) at a 1937 symposium with Kaj Birket-Smith (right), where they presented a joint paper on Alaskan ethnology.

Kaj Birket-Smith (20 January 1893 – 28 October 1977) was a Danish philologist and anthropologist. He specialized in studying the habits and language of the Inuit and Eyak. He was a member of Knud Rasmussen's 1921 Thule expedition. In 1940, he became director of the Ethnographic Department of the National Museum of Denmark.

== Personal life ==
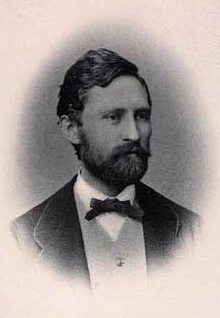
Sophus Birket-Smith

Kaj Birket-Smith was the son of Danish librarian and literary historian Sophus Birket-Smith and wife, Ludovica (born Nielsen). He received his PhD in linguistics at the University of Pennsylvania in 1937. He was a Knight of the Order of the Dannebrog.

In 1920, Kaj and Minna Birket-Smith wed. Kaj Birket-Smith died in 1977, aged 84.

== Awards ==
- 1933 Hans Egede Medal by the Royal Danish Geographical Society
- 1938 Loubat Prize of the Royal Swedish Academy
- 1952 Huxley Memorial Medal by the Royal Anthropological Institute of Great Britain and Ireland

== Partial works ==
- (1916). The Greenland bow. København: Bianco Lunos Bogtrykkeri.
- (1918). A geographic study of the early history of the Algonquian Indians
- (1920). Ancient artefacts from the Eastern United States
- (1924). Ethnography of the Egedesminde District with Aspects of the General Culture of West Greenland
- (1925). Preliminary report of the Fifth Thule Expedition Physical anthropology, linguistics, and material culture
- (1928). On the origin of Eskimo culture
- (1928). Five hundred Eskimo words: A comparative vocabulary from Greenland and Central Eskimo dialects
- (1928). The Greenlanders of the present day
- (1928). Physiography of West Greenland
- (1929). The Caribou Eskimos. Material and social life and their cultural position
- (1929). Drinking-tube and tobacco pipe in North America
- (1930). Contributions to Chipewyan ethnology
- (1933). Geographical notes on the Barren
- (1938). The Eyak Indians of the Copper River Delta, Alaska
- (1940). Anthropological observations of the Central Eskimos
- (1943). The origin of maize cultivation
