= Peter Freuchen =

Danish explorer and anthropologist (1886–1957)

- Freuchen some time before 1915
- Born: Lorenz Peter Elfred Freuchen; 20 February 1886; Nykøbing Falster, Denmark
- Died: 2 September 1957 (aged 71); Anchorage, Alaska, US
- Education: University of Copenhagen
- Known for: Arctic exploration
- Spouses: Navarana (Mequpaluk) (m. 1911; died 1921) Magda Vang Lauridsen (m. 1924; div. 1944) Dagmar Cohn (m. 1945)
- Children: Pipaluk Freuchen, Mequsaq
- Scientific career
- Fields: Anthropology

Lorenz Peter Elfred Freuchen (20 February 1886 – 2 September 1957) was a Danish explorer, author, journalist and anthropologist. He is notable for his role in Arctic exploration, namely the Thule Expeditions.

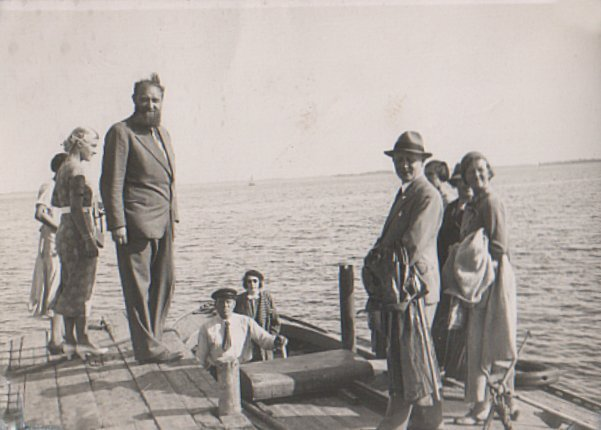
Peter Freuchen with guests at Enehøje on Nakskov Fjord

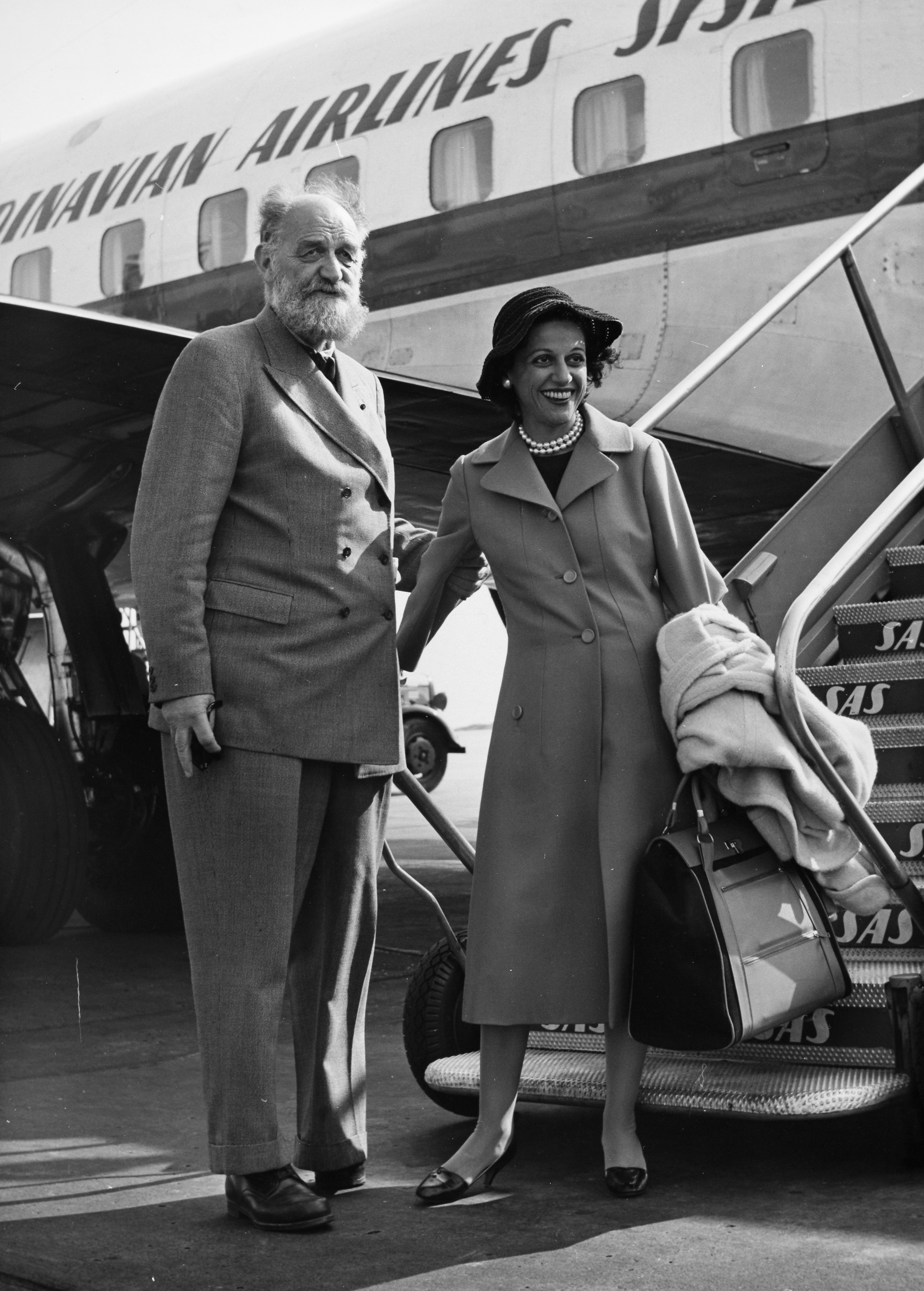
Peter Freuchen with his wife Dagmar Cohn

== Early life, family and education ==
Freuchen was born in Nykøbing Falster, Denmark, the son of Anne Petrine Frederikke (née Rasmussen; 1862–1945) and Lorentz Benzon Freuchen (1859–1927), a businessman. Freuchen was baptized in the local church. He attended the University of Copenhagen where for a time he studied medicine.

== Career ==
In 1906, he went on his first expedition to Greenland as a member of the Denmark expedition. Between 1910 and 1924, he undertook several expeditions, often with the noted Polar explorer Knud Rasmussen. He worked with Rasmussen in crossing the Greenland ice sheet. He spent many years in North Star Bay, Greenland, living with the Polar Inuit. In 1935, Freuchen visited South Africa, and by the end of the decade, he had travelled to Siberia.

In 1910, Rasmussen and Freuchen established the Thule Trading Station at North Star Bay in the Cape York district of Greenland, as a trading base. The name Thule was chosen because it was the most northerly trading post in the world, literally the "Ultima Thule". Thule Trading Station became the home base for a series of seven expeditions, known as the Thule Expeditions, between 1912 and 1933.

The First Thule Expedition (1912, Rasmussen, Freuchen, Inukitsork, and Uvdloriark) aimed to test Robert Peary's claim that a channel divided Peary Land from Greenland. They proved this was not the case in a 1,000 km (620 mi) journey across the inland ice that almost killed them. Clements Markham, president of the Royal Geographical Society, called the journey the "finest ever performed by dogs." Freuchen wrote personal accounts of this journey (and others) in Vagrant Viking (1953) and I Sailed with Rasmussen (1958). He states in Vagrant Viking that only one other dogsled trip across Greenland was ever successful. When he was buried under an avalanche, he claims to have used his own feces to fashion a dagger with which he freed himself.

While in Denmark, Freuchen and Rasmussen held a series of lectures about their expeditions and the Inuit culture.

Freuchen's first wife, Mequpaluk, who took the name Navarana, accompanied him on several expeditions. When she died, he wanted her buried in the church graveyard in Upernavik. The church refused to perform the burial, because Navarana was not baptized, so Freuchen buried her himself. Knud Rasmussen later used the name Navarana for the lead role in the movie Palos Brudefærd which was filmed in East Greenland in 1933. Freuchen strongly criticized the Christian church which sent missionaries among the Inuit without understanding their culture and traditions.

When Freuchen returned to Denmark in the 1920s, he joined the Social Democrats and contributed with articles in the newspaper Politiken. From 1926 to 1932, he served as the editor-in-chief of a magazine, Ude og Hjemme ('Out and At Home'), owned by the family of his second wife. He was also the leader of a movie company.

In 1932, Freuchen returned to Greenland. This time the expedition was financed by the American Metro-Goldwyn-Mayer film studios.

He was also employed by the film industry as a consultant and scriptwriter, specializing in Arctic-related scripts, most notably MGM's Oscar-winning Eskimo/Mala The Magnificent starring Ray Mala, and featuring Freuchen as Ship Captain. The film is based on Freuchen's novels Der Eskimo and Die Flucht ins weisse Land (The Flight into the White Land).

In 1938, he founded The Adventurer's Club of Denmark (Danish: Eventyrernes Klub), which still exists. They later honored his memory by planting an oak tree and creating an Inuksuk (a type of stone landmark or cairn) near the place where he left Denmark for Greenland in 1906. It is situated east of Langeliniebroen in central Copenhagen and not far from its statue of The Little Mermaid.

During World War II, Freuchen was actively involved with the Danish resistance movement against the occupation by Nazi Germany despite having lost his left foot to frostbite in 1926. He openly claimed to be Jewish whenever he witnessed anti-semitism. Freuchen was imprisoned by the Germans and sentenced to death, but he escaped and fled to Sweden. In 1945 he married Danish-Jewish designer Dagmar Freuchen-Gale.

In 1956, he won the main prize on The $64,000 Question, an American TV quiz-show, on the subject "The Seven Seas"; it made him instantly better known in the United States due to the popularity of the show.

As he related in Vagrant Viking, he was friends with the royal families of Scandinavia and other countries, and his movie work in New York City and Hollywood brought him into the 'royalty' of moving pictures and the political world of Washington, D.C.

== Personal life ==
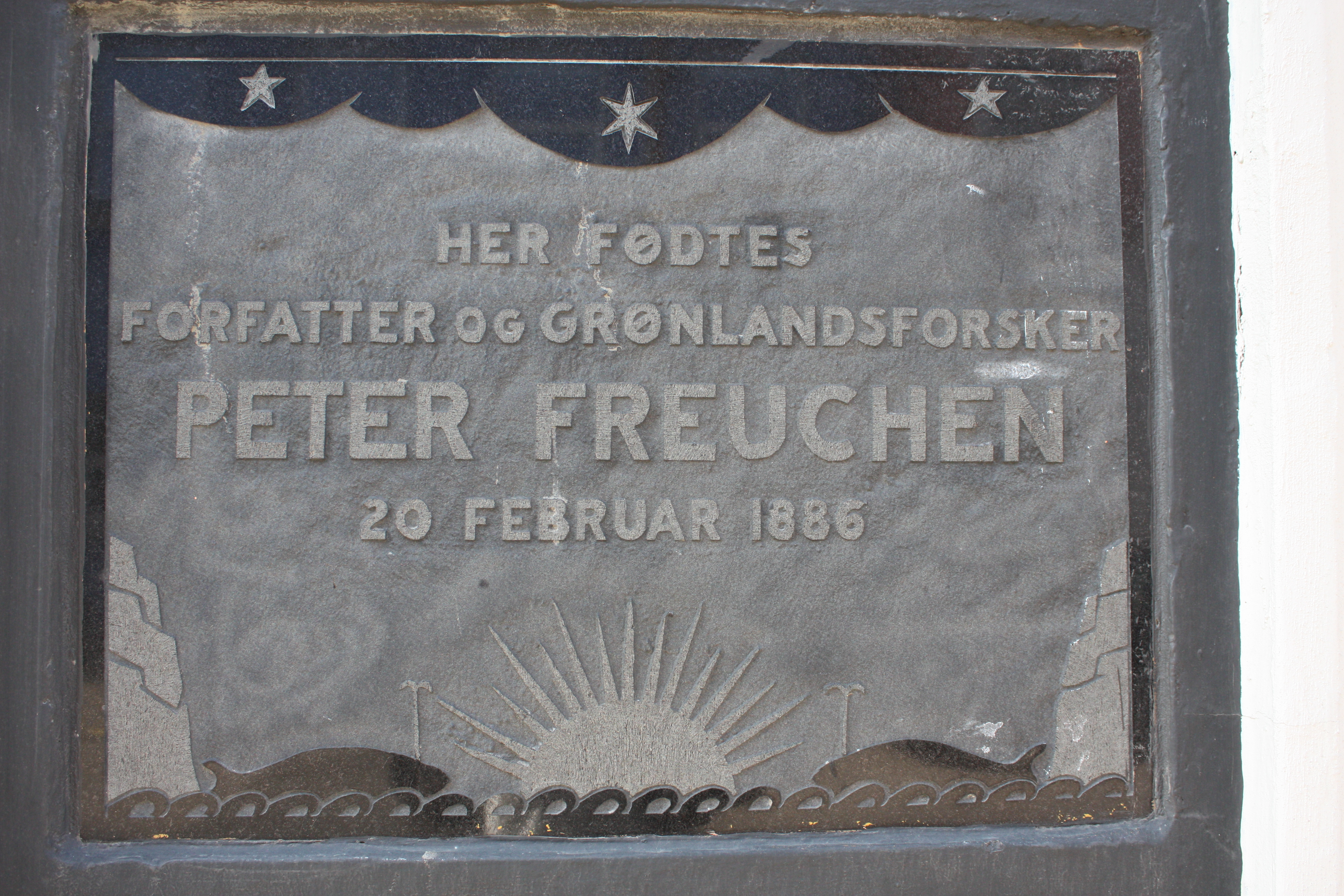
Commemorative plaque on Freuchen's birthplace in Nykøbing Falster

Freuchen was married three times. He was first married in 1911 to Navarana Mequpaluk (d. 1921), an Inuk woman who died in the Spanish Flu epidemic after bearing two children (a boy named Mequsaq Avataq Igimaqssusuktoranguapaluk (1916 – c. 1962) and a girl named Pipaluk Jette Tukuminguaq Kasaluk Palika (1918–1999)). His second marriage was to Magdalene Vang Lauridsen (1881–1960), daughter of Johannes Peter Lauridsen (1847–1920), Danish businessman and director of Danmarks Nationalbank. The marriage started in 1924 and was dissolved in 1944. In 1945, he married Danish fashion illustrator, Dagmar Cohn (1907–1991).

Freuchen's grandson, Peter Ittinuar, was the first Inuk in Canada to be elected as an MP, and represented the electoral district of Nunatsiaq in the House of Commons of Canada from 1979 to 1984.

From 1926 to 1940, Freuchen owned the Danish island Enehøje in Nakskov Fjord. During this period he wrote several books and articles and entertained guests. At this time, Freuchen became heavily invested in socialism and anti-fascism. Since 2000, the uninhabited island has been a part of Nakskov Vildtreservat, a wildlife reserve.

In his later years, Freuchen and his wife Dagmar lived in New York City and maintained a second home in Noank, Connecticut.

The preface of his last work, Book of the Seven Seas, is dated 30 August 1957, in Noank. He died of a heart attack three days later at the Elmendorf Air Force Base in Anchorage, Alaska. After his death, his ashes were scattered on the famous table-shaped Mount Dundas outside of Thule.

== Honours and awards ==
- Member, Royal Danish Geographical Society
- Fellow, American Geographical Society
- 1921 – Hans Egede Medal from the Royal Danish Geographical Society

Freuchen Land in Greenland was named after him and Navarana Fjord was named after his first wife.

Streets are named after him in the danish cities of Vejle, Aalborg, Hjørring, Frederikshavn and his native town Nykøbing F.

== Literary prizes ==
- 1938 – Sophus Michaëlis' Legat
- 1954 – Herman Bangs Mindelegat
- 1955 – Kaptajn H.C. Lundgreens Legat

== Selected works ==
- Grønland, land og folk, 1927 (Travelbook) Freuchen's first book
- Storfanger, 1927 (Novel)
- Rømningsmand, 1928 (novel)
- Nordkaper, 1929 – The Sea Tyrant (novel)
- Ivalu, 1930 – Ivalu, the Eskimo Wife – suomennettu (novel)
- Knud Rasmussen. Mindeudgave. 3 vol, 1934 (Peter Freuchen, Therkel Mathiassen and Kaj Birket-Smith)
- Flugten til Sydamerika, 1935 (Memories)
- Arctic Adventure: My Life in the Frozen North, Farrar & Rinehart, New York, Toronto, Copyright 1935.
- Min grønlandske ungdom, 1936 and 1953 (Memories)
- Nuoruuteni Grönlannissa (Memories)
- Min anden ungdom, 1938 (Memories)
- Sibiriske eventyr, 1939 (Memories)
- Diamantdronningen, 1941 (novel)
- Hvid mand, 1943 – White Man – Valkoinen mies eskimoiden parissa (novel)
- Eskimofortællinger, 1944 (novel)
- Solfjeld, 1944 (novel)
- Larions lov, 1948 – The Law of Larion (novel about the inland Indians along the Yukon river)
- Nigger-Dan, 1951 (novel, aka The Legend of Daniel Williams)
- I al frimodighed 1953 (Memories)
- Ice Floes and Flaming Water, 1954
- I all uppriktighet, 1954 (Memories)
- Vagrant Viking, 1954 (Memories)
- Fremdeles frimodig, 1955
- Fortfarende uppriktig, 1956 og 1960 (Memories)
- Fangsmænd i Melville-bugten, 1956 – Pyyntimiehiä Melville lahdella (novel)
- Fra Thule til Rio, 1957 (Memories)
- Peter Freuchen's Book of the Seven Seas, Julian Messner, Inc., New York, Copyright 1957.
- Peter Freuchens bog om de syv have, 1959 (Documentary)
- The Arctic Year, G.P. Putnam's Sons, New York, Copyright 1958. (Peter Freuchen and Finn Salomonsen)
- I Sailed with Rasmussen, 1958 (Documentary)
- Hvalfangerne, 1959 (novel)
- Peter Freuchen's Adventures in the Arctic, Julian Messner, Inc., New York, Copyright 1960. (Edited by Dagmar Freuchen)
- Det arktiske år, 1961 – Arctic Year (Documentary)
- Peter Freuchen's Book of the Eskimos, Peter Freuchen Estate. Cleveland Ohio, Copyright 1961. (Edited by Dagmar Freuchen)
- Erindringer, 1963 – (Edited by Dagmar Freuchen)

== Biography ==
- Mitenbuler, Reid (2023). Wanderlust: An Eccentric Explorer, an Epic Journey, a Lost Age. HarperCollins. ISBN 9780063323155.
