= Singnagtugaq =

Greenlandic novel

Singnagtugaq (English: The Dream) is a Greenlandic novel. It was published in 1914, and it was the first novel written entirely in the Greenlandic language. It is commonly seen as one of the originating texts in Greenlandic literature.

== Background ==
The author of Singnagtugaq, native Greenlander Mathias Storch, was ordained as a priest in 1910. In his youth, was a proponent of the peqatigiinniat movement, which sought to reawaken the Greenlandic people as a nation and deepen Christian faith. At the time of the novel's publication, the writing of songs was prominent in Greenlandic cultural consciousness, and a significant debate was being held: As Danish eskimologist Inge Kleivan put it, "does identity have to be based on the traditional hunting culture or is the Greenlandic language the most important qualification for being a Greenlander?".

== Publication ==
Mathias Storch published the novel in 1914, and it was the first published in the Greenlandic language. It is characterised as a Bildungsroman story, set in the early 1900s, which describes the need for Greenlanders to at once deepen their Christian faith, while also seeking to diversify their knowledge. The end of the novel depicts its main character having a dream of a Greenlandic future defined by an entrance into modernity, where Greenland experiences elections and engages in industrial fishing. It is influenced by the peqatigiinniat movement, and unlike the Greenlandic cultural milieu of the time, does not take the position that a pre-Christian Greenland was favorable to Christianisation.

In 1915, Knud Rasmussen translated the novel into Danish and republished it as En grønlænders drøm. Since then, it has been republished several times in Greenlandic, including in serialized, original, and new orthographic forms. The novel has commonly been referred to as one of the progenitors of Greenlandic literature, which often developed similarly to Danish literature. According to literary scholars Kristin Lorentsen and Jakob Stougaard-Nielsen, Singnagtugaq was the most influential piece of Greenlandic literature until Ole Korneliussen published Tarrarsuummi tarraq (Danish: Saltstøtten, English: The Pillar of Salt) in 1999. Its imagination of an alternative future is similar to fellow Greenalandic author Frederik Nielsen's 1934 novel Tûmarse (English: Thomas), though they are quite different in what they imagine.
