= Carsten Olsen =

Danish plant ecologist and plant physiologist

- Born: 1 March 1891; Copenhagen, Denmark
- Died: 19 August 1974 (aged 83); Copenhagen
- Education: University of Copenhagen
- Known for: Plant nutrition in relation to soil pH
- Scientific career
- Fields: Plant ecology, Plant physiology
- Workplaces: Carlsberg Laboratory

Carsten Erik Olsen (1 March 1891 – 19 August 1974) was a Danish plant ecologist and plant physiologist, who pioneered the study of plant nutrition in soils of different pH.

== Biography ==
He was born in Copenhagen and began studies of botany at the University of Copenhagen in 1910, at first with professor Eugenius Warming, then with professor Christen Raunkiær. His doctoral dissertation (1921) was on the influence of soil pH on the natural distribution of plants. He was then employed by the Carlsberg Laboratory as an assistant to the chemist S. P. L. Sørensen, later in his own lab. There, he worked on plant uptake of ions, especially iron, nitrogen fixation and calcicolous plants.

Olsen's soil pH series with four plant species: Deschampsia flexuosa, Senecio sylvaticus, Sanguisorba minor, Tussilago farfara

== Scientific works by Carsten Olsen ==
- Olsen, C. (1914) Vegetationen i nordsjællandske Sphagnummoser. Botanisk Tidsskrift 34, 1-44.
- Olsen, C. (1914) The structure and biology of Arctic flowering plants. 9. Cornaceae. Meddelelser om Grønland 37, 127-150.
- Olsen, Carsten Erik (1916) Morfologisk, biologisk og formationsstatistisk Undersøgelse af Mosserne og Karplanterne i de danske Egeskoves og Egekrats Bundflora. Gold medal prize dissertation, University of Copenhagen, 1916. 204 pp.
- Olsen, C. (1917) Studier over Epifyt-Mossernes Indvandringsfølge (Succession) paa Barken af vore forskellige Træer, samt et Bidrag til disse Mossers Økologi [Eng. summ.]. Botanisk Tidsskrift 34, 313-342.
- Olsen, C. (1921) The concentration of hydrogen ions in the soil. Science 54 (1405), 539-541.
- Olsen, C. (1921) The ecology of Urtica dioica. Journal of Ecology 9, 1-17.
- Olsen, C. (1923) Studies on the hydrogen ion concentration of the soil and its significance to the vegetation, especially to the natural distribution of plants. Comptes Rendus des Travaux du Laboratoire Carlsberg, 15 (1), 1-166. Translation of Doctoral Thesis, University of Copenhagen, 1921.
- Olsen, C. & Linderstrøm-Lang, K. (1927) On the accuracy of the various methods of measuring concentration of Hydrogen ions in soil. Comptes Rendus des Travaux du Laboratoire Carlsberg, 17 (1), 1-27.
- Olsen, C. (1929) On the determination of nitrogen in soils: with special reference to the presence of nitrates and nitrites. Comptes Rendus des Travaux du Laboratoire Carlsberg, 17 (3), 1-13.
- Olsen, C. (1928) On the significance of hydrogen-ion concentration for the cycle of nitrogen transformation in the soil. Comptes Rendus des Travaux du Laboratoire Carlsberg, 17 (8), 1-21.
- Olsen, C. (1929) On the analytical determination of ammonia in soil, and the adsorption power of soil for ammonia. Comptes Rendus des Travaux du Laboratoire Carlsberg, 17 (15), 1-20.
- Olsen, C. (1929) On the influence of humus substances on the growth of green plants in water culture. Comptes Rendus des Travaux du Laboratoire Carlsberg, 18 (1), 1-16.
- Olsen, C. (1932) Studier on nitrogen fixation. I. Nitrogen fixation in the dead leaves of forest beds. Comptes Rendus des Travaux du Laboratoire Carlsberg, 19 (9), 1-36.
- Olsen, C. (1934) The absorption of manganese by plants. Comptes Rendus des Travaux du Laboratoire Carlsberg, 20, 1-34.
- Olsen, C. (1934) Über Manganaufnahme der Pflanzen. Biochem. Zeitschr., 269, 329-348.
- Olsen, C. (1935) Iron absorption and chlorosis in green plants. Comptes Rendus des Travaux du Laboratoire Carlsberg, 21, 15-52.
- Olsen, C. (1936) The absorption of manganese by plants. II. Toxicity of manganese to various plant species. Comptes Rendus des Travaux du Laboratoire Carlsberg, 21, 129-146.
- Olsen, C. (1937) Über die Anwendbarkeit des Kjeldahlschen Stickstoffbestimmungsverfahrens bei biologischen Untersuchungen. Biochem. Zeitschr., 291, 178-187.
- Hevesy, G., Linderstrøm-Lang, K., & Olsen, C. (1937) Exchange of phosphorus atoms in plants and seeds. Nature 139, 149-150.
- Olsen, C. (1938) Experiments with different quantities of iron salts given to maize in water culture. Comptes Rendus des Travaux du Laboratoire Carlsberg. Série Chimique, 21, 301-313.
- Olsen, C. (1938) Growth of Deschampsia flexuosa in culture solutions (water culture experiments) and in soils with different pH values. Comptes Rendus des Travaux du Laboratoire Carlsberg. Série Chimique, 22, 405.
- Olsen, C. (1938) Undersøgelser over Bundfloraen i danske Egeskove og Egekrat. Botanisk Tidsskrift 44, 367-432.
- Olsen, C. (1939) Absorption of calcium and formation of oxalic acid in higher green plants. Comptes Rendus des Travaux du Laboratoire Carlsberg. Série Chimique, 23 (8), 101-123.
- Hevesy, G., Linderstrøm-Lang, K., Keston, A.S. & Olsen, C. (1940) Exchange of Nitrogen atoms in the leaves of sunflower. Comptes Rendus des Travaux du Laboratoire Carlsberg. Série Chimique, 23, 213-218.
- Olsen, C. (1942) Water culture experiments with higher green plants in nutrient solutions having different concentrations of calcium. Comptes Rendus des Travaux du Laboratoire Carlsberg. Série Chimique, 24 (4), 1-29.
- Olsen, C. (1942) On the chlorophyll content of sun leaves and shade leaves of beech (Fagus silvatica). Comptes Rendus des Travaux du Laboratoire Carlsberg. Série Chimique, 24 (5), 1-5.
- Olsen, C. (1943) Natural glades in beech-wood on calcareous soil. Comptes Rendus des Travaux du Laboratoire Carlsberg. Série Chimique, 24, 315-332.
- Olsen, C. (1946) Forandringer i Maglemoses Mosvegetation siden 1913-14. Botanisk Tidsskrift 46, 347-383.
- Olsen, C. (1948). The mineral, nitrogen and sugar contents of beech leaves and beech leaf sap at various times. Comptes Rendus des Travaux du Laboratoire Carlsberg. Série Chimique, 26, 197-230.
- Olsen, C. (1948). Adsorptively bound potassium in beech leaves. Physiologia Plantarum, 1, 136-141.
- Olsen, C. (1950) The significance of concentration for the rate of ion absorption by higher plants in water culture. Physiologia Plantarum, 3, 152-164.
- Olsen, C. (1953) The significance of concentration for the rate of ion absorption by higher plants in water culture. II. Experiments with aquatic plants. Physiologia Plantarum, 6, 837-843.
- Olsen, C. (1953) The significance of concentration for the rate of ion absorption by higher plants in water culture. III. The importance of stirring. Physiologia Plantarum, 6, 844-847.
- Olsen, C. (1953) The significance of concentration for the rate of ion absorption by higher plants in water culture. IV. The influence of hydrogen ion concentration. Physiologia Plantarum, 6, 848-858.
- Olsen, C. (1954) Hvilke betingelser må være opfyldte, for at Helodea canadensis kan opnå den optimale udvikling, der er årsag til dens massevise optræden i naturen [Eng. summ.]. Botanisk Tidsskrift 51, 263-273.
- Olsen, C. (1958) Iron absorption in different plant species as a function of the pH value of the solution. Comptes Rendus des Travaux du Laboratoire Carlsberg. Série Chimique, 31 (4), 1-59.
- Olsen, C. (1958) Iron uptake in different plant species as a function of the pH value of the nutrient solution. Physiologia Plantarum, 11, 889-905.
- Olsen, C. (1961) Competition between trees and herbs for nutrient elements in calcareous soil. Symposium of the Society for Experimental Botany (Cambridge), 15, 145-155.
- Olsen, C. (1970) On biological nitrogen fixation in nature, particularly in blue-green algae. Comptes Rendus des Travaux du Laboratoire Carlsberg. Série Chimique, 37 (12), 269-283.

== Other sources ==
- Obituary in Botanisk Tidsskrift 70 (1): 98-100 (1973) by E. Bille Hansen.
