= Barclay Raunkiær =

Anders Christian Barclay Raunkiær (11 November 1889 – 13 June 1915) was a Danish explorer and writer. On behalf of the Royal Danish Geographical Society, he made a journey in 1912 in eastern Arabia. His travel description is still a valuable source and an entertaining read.

Barclay Raunkiær was born in Copenhagen as the only child of the plant ecologist Christen C. Raunkiær and the author Ingeborg Raunkiær. He finished high school 1908 and started studying geography at the University of Copenhagen. He accompanied his father to Tunisia and other Mediterranean countries 1909–1910. Here, he studied the cultural geography of Tunisian agriculture, especially irrigation. When the Royal Danish Geographical Society made plans for an expedition to the Arabian Peninsula, he was made the leader. He left Copenhagen in November 1911 for Kuwait via Istanbul and Baghdad. From Kuwait, he went with a caravane to Riyadh and back to the coast of the Persian Gulf via Hofuf to Bahrain. He returned via Mumbai and Trieste to Copenhagen, arriving in June 1912. He left the university and took employment in the East Asiatic Company. The journey, however, had cost him his health. He died in Copenhagen from tuberculosis, aged twenty-five.

== Works ==
- Gennem Wahhabiternes land paa Kamelryg. Copenhagen, Gyldendalske Boghandel, 1913. 304 pp.
- Through Wahhabiland on camelback. Routledge & K. Paul (London) 1969.
