= Pálmi Hannesson =

Pálmi Hannesson (3 January 1898, in Skagafjarðarsýsla – 22 November 1956) was an Icelandic naturalist and rector of the Menntaskólinn í Reykjavík.

Pálmi was born a farmer's son; studied in Akureyri before proceeding to the Lærði Skólinn in Reykjavík; and on graduating from there proceeded to the University of Copenhagen to study natural history and geography. He concluded his education in 1926 with a master's degree in zoology. As well as being prominent among Icelandic students at Copenhagen, he was also an alderman of the Studentergården and was noted for his fluency in Danish.

In the words of Niels Nielsen,

Even as a child he felt attracted to the interior, desolate highlands, and it was one of his key experiences that he as a boy was allowed to embark on the adventure to take part in the autumn sheep collections whereby people searched the highlands on horseback up to glaciers. Throughout his life he retained his childhood love for the countryside and for horse trips, and he considered it his good fortune that his work fell at a time when motorization had not yet become influential in the practice of research on Iceland. Even as a student he began a systematic tour of the country, and over the years he became the foremost interpreter of Iceland's topography of our time, covering virtually all aspects of Iceland's geography and natural history.

In 1930, 31 years old, Pálmi became rector of Menntaskólinn í Reykjavík, a key position in Icelandic cultural life of the time; he held the position until 1956. Nonetheless, he continued his scientific work, and was an important host to visiting scientists from Denmark. On 4 November 1947 The Royal Danish Geographical Society's Hans Egede Medal, and the same year he was appointed an honorary member of the Society.

Pálmi was also a connoisseur of old and modern Icelandic literature.
