= Christen C. Raunkiær =

Danish botanist (1860–1938)

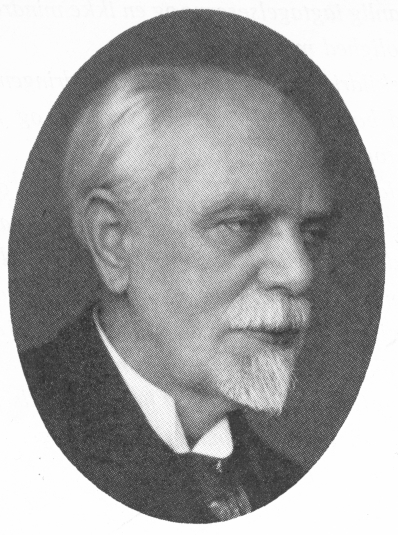
- c. 1930
- Born: 29 March 1860; Lyhne, Jutland, Denmark
- Died: 11 March 1938 (aged 77); Copenhagen, Denmark
- Education: University of Copenhagen
- Known for: Raunkiær life forms, Raunkiær's frequency law
- Scientific career
- Fields: Plant ecology, botany
- Workplaces: University of Copenhagen
- Doctoral advisor: Eugen Warming
- Doctoral students: Johannes Iversen; Carsten Olsen
- Author abbrev. (botany): Raunk.

Signature
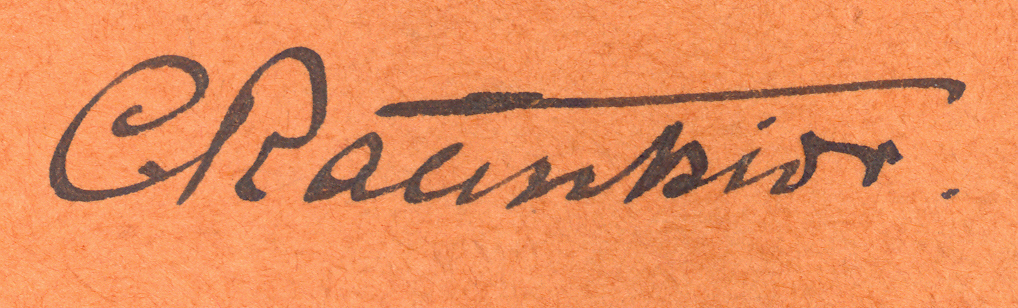

Christen Christensen Raunkiær (29 March 1860 – 11 March 1938) was a Danish botanist, who was a pioneer of plant ecology. He is mainly remembered for his scheme of plant strategies to survive an unfavourable season ("life forms") and his demonstration that the relative abundance of strategies in floras largely corresponded to the Earth's climatic zones. This scheme, the Raunkiær system, is still widely used today and may be seen as a precursor of modern plant strategy schemes, e.g. J. Philip Grime's CSR system.

== Life ==
He was born on a small heathland farm, named Raunkiær, in Lyhne parish in western Jutland, Denmark. He later took his surname after it. He succeeded Eugen Warming as professor in botany at the University of Copenhagen and the director of the Copenhagen Botanical Garden, a position he held from 1912 to 1923. He was married to the author and artist Ingeborg Raunkiær (1863–1921), who accompanied him on journeys to the West Indies and the Mediterranean and made line drawings for his botanical works. They divorced in 1915, the same year as their only son Barclay Raunkiær died. Raunkiær later married the botanist Agnete Seidelin (1874–1956).

Raunkiær's research axiom was that everything countable in nature should be subjected to numerical analysis, e.g. the number of male and female catkins in monecious plants and the number of male and female individuals in dioecious plants. Raunkiær also was an early student of apomixis in flowering plants and hybrid swarms. In addition, he studied the effect of soil pH on plants and plants on soil pH, a work his apprentice Carsten Olsen continued.

After his retirement, C. Raunkiær made numerical studies of plants and flora in the literature ("The flora and the heathland poets", "The dandelion in Danish poetry", "Plants in the psalms"). In these studies, he applied strict quantitative criteria, like in his ecological studies. For example, he defined a poet as a person who has written 1,000 or more lines of verse.

== Legacy ==
=== Life form spectra ===
Raunkiær devised a system for categorising plants by life-form as a way of ecologically meaningful comparison of species and vegetation in regions having different floras.

Raunkiær compared statistically local life form spectra (relative abundance) with the world average, which he called "the normal spectrum" (Raunkiær 1918 – see below). Thereby, he devised the first null model in the history of ecology. Raunkiær was a keen naturalist, who described the flora and fungi of Denmark, the Virgin Islands, Tunisia, and other countries. In contrast to many contemporary naturalist, however, he strongly promoted quantitative and numerical approaches and experimentation. He devised a method to quantify the abundance of plants in vegetation as frequency in subplots and used it for quantitative studies of a range of plant communities.

=== Raunkiær's law ===
When plotting the number of species in a plant community that fell in each 20-percentile frequency class from very frequent, i.e. numerically dominant, to very infrequent, Raunkiær discovered that most species were either very common or very rare. This came to be known as "Raunkiær's law" and is related to R. A. Fisher's logseries distribution and to Frank W. Preston's lognormal distribution of the number of individuals of each species in a community. The significance of his idea was, however, disputed already by some of his contemporaries.

=== Leaf size in plant geography ===
As a further experiment in characterizing plant communities, Raunkiaer devised a numerical scheme based on leaf size classes and leaf type (simple or compound) that was extended by L. J. Webb and is used as a way to classify forest types more simply than by lists of component species.

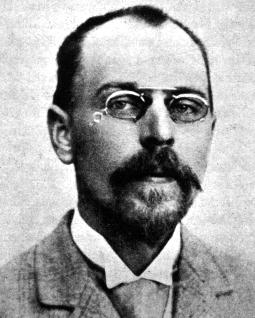
Raunkiær in 1896

== Popular references ==
Farley Mowat, in his book, Never Cry Wolf, described using a Raunkiær's Circle in making a "cover degree" study to determine the ratios of various plants one to the other. He spoke of it as "a device designed in hell."

== Scientific publications ==
- Raunkiær, C. (1887) Frøskallens Bygning og Udviklingshistorie hos Geraniaceerne. Botanisk Tidsskrift 16, 152–167.
- Raunkiær, C. (1888–89) Myxomycetes Daniae eller Danmarks Slimsvampe. Botanisk Tidsskrift 17, 20-105 Description in English of some new and of some unsatisfactorily known species of Myxomycetes described in the preceding treatise. Botanisk Tidsskrift 17, 106–110.
- Raunkiær, C. (1889) Notes on the vegetation of the North-Frisian Islands and a contribution to an eventual flora of these islands. Botanisk Tidsskrift 17, 179–196.
- Raunkiær, C. (1893) Vegetationsorganernes Morphologi og Biologi hos de danske Cyperaceer - Bestøvning og Frugtsaetning hos de danske Cyperaceer. Botanisk Tidsskrift 18, 19–23.
- Raunkiær, C. (1895) De danske Blomsterplanters Naturhistorie. l. Enkimbladede. Gyldendalske Boghandels Forlag, København.
- Raunkiær, C. (1901) Om Papildannelsen hos Aira caespitosa. Botanisk Tidsskrift 24, 223–238.
- Raunkiær, C. (1902) Statistisk Undersøgelse over Forholdet mellem Han- og Hunrakler hos vore Alnus-arter. Botanisk Tidsskrift 24, 289–296.
- Raunkiær, C. (1903) Anatomical Potamogeton-Studies and Potamogeton fluitans. Botanisk Tidsskrift 25, 253–280.
- Ostenfeld, C.H. & Raunkiær, C. (1903) Kastreringsforsøg med Hieracium og andre Cichorieae [English summary]. Botanisk Tidsskrift 25, 409–413.
- Raunkiær, C. (1904) Comment les plantes géophytes à rhizomes apprécient la profondeur où se trouvent placés leurs rhizomes. Oversigt over Det Kongelige Danske Videnskabernes Selskabs Forhandlinger, 1904, 330–349.
- Raunkiær, C. (1904) Om biologiske typer, med hensyn til planternes zilpasninger til at overleve ugunstige aarstider. Botanisk Tidsskrift 26, XIV. THIS PAGE DOES NOT CONTAIN A PAPER BY RAUNKIAER WITH THAT TITLE NOR DOES THE ENTIRE VOLUME. Ch. 1 in Raunkiær (1934): Biological types with reference to the adaption of plants to survive the unfavourable season, p. 1.
- Raunkiær, C. (1905) Types biologiques pour la géographie botanique. Oversigt over Det Kongelige Danske Videnskabernes Selskabs Forhandlinger, 1905, 347–438.THIS PAGE RANGE SEEMS DOUBTFUL, BUT IS REPEATED ON UMPTEEN ONLINE PAGES.
- Raunkiær, C. (1905) Om Talforholdene mellem Kønnene hos tvebo Planter og om Talforholdet mellem hanlige og hunlige individer i Afkommet af Hunplanter og tvekønnede Planter hos Gynodiøcister. Botanisk Tidsskrift 26, 86–88.
- Raunkiær, C. (1906) Edderkopper og blomsterbesøgende Insekter. Botanisk Tidsskrift 27, 313–316.
- Raunkiær, C. (1906) Sur la transmission par hérédité dans les espèces hétéromorphes. Oversigt over Det Kongelige Danske Videnskabernes Selskabs Forhandlinger, 1906, 31–39.
- Raunkiær, C. (1907) Planterigets Livsformer og deres Betydning for Geografien. Gyldendalske Boghandel - Nordisk Forlag, København and Kristiania. 132 pp. Ch. 2 in Raunkiær (1934): The life-forms of plants and their bearings on geography, p. 2-104.
- Raunkiær, C. (1907) Om Livsformen hos Tussilago farfarus. Et lille Bidrag til Følfodens Naturhistorie. Botanisk Tidsskrift 28, 210. Ch. 3 in Raunkiær (1934): The life-form of Tussilago farfarus, p. 105-110.
- Raunkiær, C. (1908) Livsformernes Statistik som Grundlag for biologisk Plantegeografi. Botanisk Tidsskrift 29, 42–43. German translation: Statistik der Lebensformen als Grundlage für die biologische Pflanzengeographie. Beiheft zum Bot. Centralbl., 27 (2), 171-206 (1910). Ch. 4 in Raunkiær (1924): The statistics of life-forms as a basis for biological plant geography, p. 111-147.
- Raunkiær, C. (1908) Fungi from the Danish West Indies collected 1905–1906. Botanisk Tidsskrift 29, 1–3.
- Raunkiær, C. (1909) Livsformen hos Planter paa ny Jord. Kongelige Danske Videnskabernes Selskabs Skrifter - Naturvidenskabelig og Mathematisk Afdeling, 7.Rk., 8, 1-70. Ch. 5 in Raunkiær (1934): The life-forms of plants on new soil, p. 148-200.
- Raunkiær, C. (1909a) Formationsundersøgelse og Formationsstatistik. Botanisk Tidsskrift 30, 20–132. Ch. 6 in Raunkiær (1934): Investigations and statistics of plant formations, p. 201-282.
- Raunkiær, C. (1911) Det arktiske og antarktiske Chamaefyteklima. In: Biologiske Arbejder tilegnede Eug. Warming paa hans 70 Aars Fødselsdag den 3. Nov. 1911. Kjøbenhavn. Ch. 7 in Raunkiær (1934): The Arctic and Antarctic chamaephyte climate, p. 283-302.
- Raunkiær, C. (1912) Measuring-apparatus for statistical investigations of plant-formations. Botanisk Tidsskrift 33, 45–48.
- Raunkiær, C. (1913) Formationsstatistiske Undersøgelser paa Skagens Odde. Botanisk Tidsskrift 33, 197–243. Ch. 8 in Raunkiær (1934): Statistical investigations of the plant formations of Skagens Odde (The Skaw), p. 303-342.
- Raunkiær, C. (1914) Sur la végétation des alluvions méditerranéennes françaises. Mindeskrift i Anledning af Hundredeaaret for Japetus Steenstrups Fødsel (eds H. F. E. Jungersen & E. Warming), pp. 1–33. København. Ch. 9 in Raunkiær (1934): On the vegetation of the French mediterranean alluvia, p. 343-367.
- Raunkiær, C. (1916) Om Bladstørrelsens Anvendelse i den biologiske Plantegeografi. Botanisk Tidsskrift 34, 1–13. Ch. 10 in Raunkiær (1934): The use of leaf size in biological plant geography, p. 368-378
- Raunkiær, C. (1916) Om Valensmetoden. Botanisk Tidsskrift 34, 289–311.
- Raunkiær, C. (1918) Om Løvspringstiden hos Afkommet af Bøge med forskellig Løvspringstid [English summary]: On leaftime in the descendants from beeches with different leaftimes]. Botanisk Tidsskrift 36, 197–203.
- Raunkiær, C. (1918) Recherches statistiques sur les formations végétales. Biologiske Meddelelser / Kongelige Danske Videnskabernes Selskab, 1 (3), 1-80. Ch 11 in Raunkiær (1934): Statistical researches on plant formations, p. 379-424.
- Raunkiær, C. (1918) Über das biologische Normalspektrum. Biologiske Meddelelser / Kongelige Danske Videnskabernes Selskab, 1 (4), 1–17. Ch. 12 in Raunkiær (1934): On the biological normal spectrum, p. 425-434.
- Raunkiær, C. (1918) Über die verhältnismässige Anzahl männlicher und weiblicher Individuen bei Rumex thyrsiflorus Fingerh. Biologiske Meddelelser / Kongelige Danske Videnskabernes Selskab, 1 (7), 1–17.
- Børgesen, F. & Raunkiær, C. (1918) Mosses and Lichens collected in the former Danish West Indies. Dansk Botanisk Arkiv 2 (9): 1–18.
- Raunkiær, C. (1919) Über Homodromie und Antidromie insbesondere bei Gramineen. Biologiske Meddelelser / Kongelige Danske Videnskabernes Selskab, 1 (12), 1-22.
- Raunkiær, C. (1920) Egern, Mus, og Grankogler. En naturhistorisk Studie. Biologiske Meddelelser / Kongelige Danske Videnskabernes Selskab, 2 (4), 1-90.
- Raunkiær, C. (1920) Om Kryptogamernes Betydning for Karakteriseringen af Planteklimaterne. Botanisk Tidsskrift 37, 151–158. Ch. 13 in Raunkiær (1934): On the significance of Cryptogams for characterizing Plant climates, p. 435-442.
- Raunkiær, C. (1922) Forskellige Vegetationstypers forskellige Indflydelse paa Jordbundens Surhedsgrad (Brintionkoncentration). Biologiske Meddelelser / Kongelige Danske Videnskabernes Selskab, 3 (10), 1-74. Ch. 14 in Raunkiær (1934): The different influence exercised by various types of vegetation on the degree of acidity (Hydrogen-ion concentration), p. 443-487.
- Raunkiær, C. (1926) Nitratindholdet hos Anemone nemorosa paa forskellige Standpladser. Biologiske Meddelelser / Kongelige Danske Videnskabernes Selskab, 5 (5), 1-47. Ch. 15 in Raunkiær (1934): The Nitrate content of Anemone nemorosa growing in various localities, p. 488-516.
- Raunkiær, C. (1926) Om danske Agropyrum-Arter. (Isoreagent-Studier II). Botanisk Tidsskrift 39, 329–347.
- Raunkiær, C. (1926) Vegetationen paa Maglehøj (vest for Arresø) og lidt om vore Kaempehøjes Flora i det hele taget. Botanisk Tidsskrift 39, 348–356.
- Raunkiær, C. (1928) Dominansareal, Artstaethed og Formationsdominanter. Biologiske Meddelelser / Kongelige Danske Videnskabernes Selskab, 7 (1), 1-47. Ch 16 in Raunkiær (1934): The area of dominance, species density, and formation dominants, p. 517-546.
- Raunkiær, C. (1928) Myxomycetes from the West Indian Islands St. Croix, St. Thomas and St. Jan. Dansk Botanisk Arkiv 5 (16), 1–9.
- Raunkiær, C. (1930) Variation hos Tussilago farfarus L. Botanisk Tidsskrift 41, 257–258.
- Raunkiær, C. (1934) Om de danske Arter af Stellaria media-Gruppen. Botaniske Studier, 1. haefte (ed C. Raunkiær), pp. 3–30. J.H. Schultz Forlag, København.
- Raunkiær, C. (1934) The Life Forms of Plants and Statistical Plant Geography. Introduction by A.G. Tansley. Oxford University Press, Oxford. 632 pp. Collection of 16 of Raunkiær's publications plus one new.
- Raunkiær, C. (1934) Botanical studies in the Mediterranean region. Ch. 17 in The Life Forms of Plants and Statistical Plant Geography, pp. 547–620.
- Raunkiær, C. (1935) The vegetation of the sand dunes north of Sousse. Botaniske Studier, 3. haefte (ed C. Raunkiær), pp. 244–248. J.H. Schultz Forlag, København.
- Raunkiær, C. (1936) The life-form spectrum of some Atlantic islands. Botaniske Studier, 4. haefte (ed C. Raunkiær), pp. 249–328. J.H. Schultz Forlag, København.
- Raunkiær, C. (1937) Artstal, Artstaethed og Praedominanter i danske Plantesamfund. Botaniske Studier, 5. haefte (ed C. Raunkiær), pp. 357–382. J.H. Schultz Forlag, København.
- Raunkiær, C. (1937) Hudcellepapiller hos Carex arenaria. Botaniske Studier, 5. haefte (ed C. Raunkiær), pp. 329–336. J.H. Schultz Forlag, København.
- Raunkiær, C. (1937) Life-form, genus area, and number of species. Botaniske Studier, 5. haefte (ed C. Raunkiær), pp. 343–356. J.H. Schultz Forlag, København.
- Raunkiær, C. (1937) Plantago intermedia og Plantago major. Botaniske Studier, 5. haefte (ed C. Raunkiær), pp. 337–342. J.H. Schultz Forlag, København.

== Reviews and biographies ==
- Fuller G.D. (1935). "Raunkiaer's ecological papers". Ecology. 16 (1): 111–113. Bibcode:1935Ecol...16..111F. doi:10.2307/1932864. JSTOR 1932864.
- Smith W.G. (1913). "Raunkiaer's "life-forms" and statistical methods". Journal of Ecology. 1 (1): 16–26. Bibcode:1913JEcol...1...16S. doi:10.2307/2255456. JSTOR 2255456.
- Biography by O.G. Petersen in: Dansk Biografisk Lexikon, 1st edn 1887-1905 (ed. Carl Frederik Bricka)
- Biography by Carl Christensen in: Dansk Biografisk Leksikon, 3rd edn 1979-1984 (ed. Svend Cedergreen Bech).
