= Johannes Iversen =

Danish palaeoecologist and plant ecologist

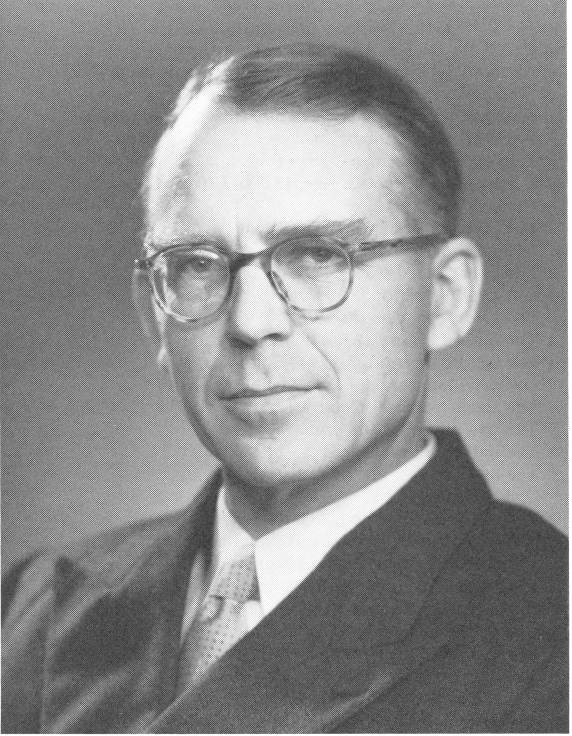
Iversen c. 1955

Johannes Iversen (Danish pronunciation: [ˈiˀvɐsn̩], 12 December 1904 – 17 October 1971) was a Danish palaeoecologist and plant ecologist.

== Biography ==
He was born in Sønderborg and began studies in botany at the University of Copenhagen in 1923 under professor C.H. Ostenfeld, and with considerable inspiration from prof.em. Christen C. Raunkiær. At first he worked with macrophyte vegetation of lakes in relation to water pH. The influence from Raunkiær is particularly evident in Iversen's doctoral thesis, in which he divided herbaceous plants into hydrotypes based on experiments and morphological studies: xerophytes, mesophytes, hygrophytes, telmatophytes, amphiphytes and limnophytes. In addition, halobio-types (salt tolerance) were described. He brilliantly used modern equivalents in the interpretation of pollen diagrams, e.g. his now classic studies on frost damage to ivy (Hedera) and holly (Ilex) during the severe winters of the early 1940s led to their fossil pollen being used as climate indicators. Iversen demonstrated the steppe and tundra components of the late glacial flora. Iversen conducted a practical experiment with stone axe clear-cutting and slash-and-burn agriculture in a primeval forest to study the forest regeneration.

In 1931, Iversen was first appointed assistant at the Geological Survey of Denmark and Greenland. In 1938, Iversen became a Sectional geologist and in 1942 he became State Geologist, an appointment he kept until his death. In 1955, he became a lecturer in pollen analysis at the University of Copenhagen. In 1953, he was made a member of the Royal Danish Academy of Sciences and Letters. He was awarded honorary doctorates at Uppsala University and Cambridge University.

== Textbook of modern pollen analysis ==
- Fægri, Knut & Iversen, J. (1950) Textbook of modern pollen analysis. Ejnar Munksgaard, Copenhagen. 168 p.
- Fægri, Knut & Iversen, J. (1964) Textbook of pollen analysis, 2nd edn. Scandinavian University Books, Copenhagen. 237 p.
- Fægri, K. & Iversen, J. (1975) Textbook of pollen analysis, 3rd ed. by Knut Fægri, Scandinavian University Books, Copenhagen. 294 p.
- Fægri, K. & Iversen, J. (1989) Textbook of pollen analysis. 4th ed. by K. Fægri, P.E. Kaland & K. Krzywinski. John Wiley & Sons, Chichester. 328 p.

== Scientific works by Johs. Iversen ==
- Iversen, J. (1928) Über Isoëtes in China und Japan. Dansk Botanisk Arkiv, 5 (23), 1–4.
- Iversen, J. (1928) Über die Spezies-Umgrenzung und Variation der Isoëtes echinospora Durieu. Botanisk Tidsskrift, 40 (2), 126–131.
- Iversen, J. (1929) Studien über die pH-Verhältnisse dänischer Gewässer und ihren Einfluss auf die Hydrophyten-Vegetation. Botanisk Tidsskrift, 40 (4), 277–333.
  - Keywords: plant ecology
- Iversen, J. (1930) Isoëtes, In: Christensen, C., The pteridophytes of Madagascar. Dansk Botanisk Arkiv, 7, 200–201.
- Gabrielsen, E.K. & Iversen, J. (1933) Die Vegetation der Halbinsel Skallingen. Botanisk Tidsskrift, 42 (4), 355–383.
  - Keywords: plant ecology
- Iversen, J. (1933) Studier over Vegetationen i Ringkøbing Fjord før Hvide Sande-Kanalens genåbning 1931 (with English summary). In: Johansen, A.C. & Blegvad, H. (eds) Ringkøbing Fjords Naturhistorie i Brakvandsperioden 1915–1931.
  - Keywords: plant ecology
- Iversen, J. (1934) Fund af Vildhest (Equus caballus) fra Overgangen mellem Sen- og Postglacialtid i Danmark. (Meddelelser fra Dansk Geologisk Forening, 8, 327-340 ). Danmarks Geologiske Undersøgelse IV.række, 2 (13), 1-16.
- Iversen, J. (1934) Moorgeologische Untersuchungen auf Grönland. Ein Beitrag zur Beleuchtung der Ursachen des Unterganges der mittelalterlichen Nordmännerkultur. Meddelelser fra Dansk Geologisk Forening, 8, 341–358.
  - Keywords: Demise of Greenland Norse settlements
- Iversen, J. (1936) Biologische Pflanzentypen als Hilfsmittel in der Vegetationsforschung. Ein Beitrag zur ökologischer Charakterisierung und Anordnung der Pflanzengesellshaften. Doctoral dissertation, University of Copenhagen. Levin & Munksgaard, København.
  - Keywords: plant ecology
- Iversen, J. (1936) Sekundäres Pollen als Fehlerquelle. Eine Korrektionsmethode zur Pollenanalyse minerogener Sedimente. Danmarks Geologiske Undersøgelse IV.række, 2 (15), 1-24.
  - Keywords: pollen analysis
- Iversen, J. (1937) Pollenalalytiske Tidsbestemmelser af midtjydske mesolitiske Bopladser (Appendix til Th. Mathiassen: Gudenaa-Kulturen). Aarbøger for nordisk Oldkyndighed og Historie 1937, 182–186.
- Iversen, J. (1937) Undersøgelser over Litorinatransgressioner i Danmark. Meddelelser fra Dansk Geologisk Forening, 9, 223–232.
  - Nominated as one of the most significant 20th Century publications in Danish geology. It is one of the most cited publications on short-term, low-amplitude sea-level changes and their causes.
- Iversen, J. (1938) Et botanisk Vidne om Nordboernes Vinlandsrejser. Naturhistorisk Tidende, 2, 113–116.
- Iversen, J. (1939) Planterester fremdragne i tre Høje i Haderslev Amt. In: Broholm, H.C. & Hald, M. Skrydstrupfundet: en sønderjysk Kvindegrav fra den ældre Bronzealder. Nordiske Fortidsminder, 3, 18–21.
  - Keywords: plant macrofossils, Bronze Age, tumuli
- Iversen, J. (1940) Blütenbiologische Studien. I. Dimorphie und Monomorphie bei Armeria (English summary) Biologiske Meddelelser / Kongelige Danske Videnskabernes Selskab, 15 (8), 1-40.
  - Keywords: palynology
- Iversen, J. (1941) Landnam i Danmarks Stenalder: En pollenanalytisk Undersøgelse over det første Landbrugs Indvirkning paa Vegetationsudviklingen (Dansk tekst 7-59, Engl. text 60–65). Danmarks Geologiske Undersøgelse II.række, 66, 1-68. (reprinted 1964)
  - Keywords: palaeoecology, history of agriculture
- Degerbøl, M. & Iversen, J. (1942) On a find of Sheat-fish (Silurus glanis L.) from the Ancylos period in Denmark. Videnskabelige Meddelelser fra Dansk Naturhistorisk Forening, 105, 435–446.
- Iversen, J. & Olsen, Sigurd (1943) Die Verbreitung der Wasserpflanzen in Relation zur Chemie des Wassers. Botanisk Tidsskrift, 46, 136–145.
  - Keywords: plant ecology
- Iversen, J. (1943) En pollenanalytisk Tidsfæstelse af Ferskvandlagene ved Nørre Lyngby. Meddelelser fra Dansk Geologisk Forening, 10, 130–151.
  - Keywords: Late Weichselian
- Iversen, J. (1943) Et Litorinaprofil ved Dybvad i Vendsyssel. Meddelelser fra Dansk Geologisk Forening, 10, 324–328.
- Iversen, J. (1944) Viscum, Hedera and Ilex as climatic indicators. A contribution to the study of the Post-Glacial temperature climate. Geologiska Föreningen i Stockholm Förhandlingar, 66, 463–483.
  - Keywords: palaeoecology, plant ecology
- Iversen, J. (1944) Helianthemum som fossil Glacialplante i Danmark. Geologiska Föreningen i Stockholm Förhandlingar, 66, 774–776.
  - Keywords: Late Weichselian
- Degerbøl, M. & Iversen, J. (1945) The bison in Denmark. A zoological and geological investigation of the finds in Danish Pleistocene deposits. Danmarks Geologiske Undersøgelse II.række, 73, 1-62.
- Iversen, J. (1946) Datering af en senglacial Boplads ved Bromme (Datation Géologique de la station glaciaire postérieure de Bromme). Aarbøger for nordisk Oldkyndighed og Historie 1946: 197–231.
  - Keywords: Late Weichselian
- Iversen, J. (1947) Plantevækst, Dyreliv og Klima i det senglaciale Danmark. Geologiska Föreningen i Stockholm Förhandlingar, 69, 67–78.
  - Keywords: Late Weichselian
- Iversen, J. (1947) Centaurea cyanus-pollen in Danish late-glacial deposits. Meddelelser fra Dansk Geologisk Forening, 11, 197–200.
  - Keywords: Late Weichselian
- Iversen, J. (1947) Senglacialens nivåförändingar och klimatutveckling (contribution to discussion). In: Geologklubben vid Stockholms Högskola. Nordiskt kvartärgeologisk möte den 5–9 November 1945 [pp. 215–217, 252]. Geologiska Föreningen i Stockholm Förhandlingar, 69, 215–217.
  - Keywords: Late Weichselian
- Iversen, J. (1947) Pollenanalysens principer och tillämpning (contribution to discussion). In: Geologklubben vid Stockholms Högskola. Nordiskt kvartärgeologisk möte den 5–9 November 1945. Geologiska Föreningen i Stockholm Förhandlingar, 69, 241–242.
- Iversen, J. (1948) Palaeobotany and pollen analysis. In: The humanities and the Sciences in Denmark during the Second World War. Ejnar Munksgaard, Copenhagen, pp 313–315.
- Iversen, J. (1949) The influence of prehistoric man on vegetation. Danmarks Geologiske Undersøgelse IV.række, 3 (6), 1-25.
  - Keywords: palaeoecology, history of agriculture
- Iversen, J. (1949) Determinations of the specific gravity of the roots of swamp, meadow and dry-soil plants. Oikos, 1, 1–5.
  - Keywords: plant ecology
- Iversen, J. & Troels-Smith, J. (1950) Pollenmorfologiske definitioner og typer. Danmarks Geologiske Undersøgelse IV.række, 3 (8), 1-54.
  - Keywords: palynology
- Iversen, J. (1951) Steppeelementer i den senglaciale flora og fauna (English summary) Meddelelser fra Dansk Geologisk Forening, 12, 174–175.
  - Keywords: Late Weichselian
- Iversen, J. (1952/53) Origin of the flora of Western Greenland in the light of pollen analysis. Oikos, 4, 85-103.
- Iversen, J. (1953) Radiocarbon dating of the Alleröd period. Science, 118 (3053), 4–6.
- Iversen, J. (1953) Origin and postglacial development of the flora of West Greenland in the light of pollen analysis. Proceedings of the Seventh International Botanical Congress Stockholm, July 12–20, 1950 (eds H. Osvald & E. Åberg), pp. 634–636.
- Iversen, J. (1953) Identification of difficult pollen types by means of structural characters. Proceedings of the Seventh International Botanical Congress Stockholm, July 12–20, 1950 (eds H. Osvald & E. Åberg), pp. 873–874.
  - Keywords: palynology
- Iversen, J. (1953) The zonation of the salt marsh vegetation of Skallingen in 1931-34 and in 1952. Geografisk Tidsskrift, 52, 113–118.
- Iversen, J. (1954) The Late-Glacial flora of Denmark and its relation to climate and soil. Danmarks Geologiske Undersøgelse II.række, 80, 87-119.
  - Keywords: Late Weichselian
- Iversen, J. (1954) The late-glacial flora of South-Scandinavia and its recent relics. Huitième Congrès International de Botanique, Paris 1954, Comptes rendus des séances et rapports et communications déposés lors du congrès dans les sections 3,4,5 et 6 pp. 241–242.
  - Keywords: Late Weichselian
- Iversen, J. (1954) Über die Korrelationen zwischen den Pflanzenarten in einem grönländischen Talgebiet. Vegetatio, 5–6, 238–246.
- Iversen, J. (1956) Forest clearance in the Stone Age. Scientific American, 194, 36–41.
  - German translation (1956) Neolitische Waldrodungen beleuchtet durch Pollenanalyse und Experiment. Mitteilungen der Naturforschender Gesellschaft Bern N.F., 13, 30–32.
  - French translation (1960) Le défrichement da la forêt pendant l’age de pierre. Les Naturalistes Belges, 41, 53–64.
  - Keywords: palaeoecology, history of agriculture
- Iversen, J. (1957) Istidsrelikter i Bornholms flora. In: Bornholms naturhistoriske Forening, udgivet i anledning af 25 års jubilæet pp. 35–37.
  - Keywords: Late Weichselian
- Iversen, J. (1954) Pollenanalytischer Nachweis des Reliktencharakters eines jütischen Linden-Mischwaldes. Veröffentlichungen des Geobotanischen Institutes Rübel in Zürich, 33, 137–144.
- Iversen, J. (1958) The bearing of glacial and interglacial epochs on the formation and extinction of plant taxa. In: Hedberg, O. (ed.): Systematics of to-day. Proceedings of a symposium held at the University of Uppsala in commemoration of the 250th anniversary of Carolus Linnaeus. Acta Universitatis Upsaliensis/Uppsala Universitets Årsskrift, 1958 (6), 210–215.
  - Keywords: evolution
- Iversen, J. (1960) Problems of the early post-glacial forest development in Denmark. Danmarks Geologiske Undersøgelse IV.række, 4 (3), 1-32.
  - Keywords: palaeoecology
- Iversen, J. (1964) Retrogressive vegetational succession in the Post-glacial. Journal of Ecology, 52S, 59–70.
  - Keywords: palaeoecology
- Iversen, J. (1964) Plant indicators of climate, soil and other factors during the Quaternary. INQUA VIth international Congress on the Quaternary, Warszawa 1961, 2, 421–428.
- Iversen, J. & Fægri, Knut (1965) Field techniques. In: Handbook of Paleontological Techniques, p. 482-494. San Francisco.
- Iversen, J. & Fægri, Knut (1966) terminology in palynology. Pollen et Spores, 8, 345–445.
- Iversen, J. (1969) Retrogressive development of a forest ecosystem demonstrated by pollen diagrams from a fossil mor. Oikos, 12S, 35–49.
  - Keywords: palaeoecology
- Iversen, J. (1973) The development of Denmark's nature since the last glacial. Danmarks Geologiske Undersøgelse V.række, 7C, 1–126.
  - Keywords: palaeoecology

== Other sources ==
- Obituary in Botanisk Tidsskrift 67 (3): 275-277 (1972) by Svend Th. Andersen.
- Obituary in the New Phytologist 72 (5): 1245-1250 (1973) by Harry Godwin. doi:10.1111/j.1469-8137.1973.tb02100.x
