= Agnete Seidelin =

Danish botanist

Agnete Seidelin-Raunkiær
- Born: 5 November 1874; Denmark
- Died: 4 June 1956 (aged 81)
- Spouse: Christen C. Raunkiær
- Scientific career
- Fields: Botany

Agnete Seidelin (5 November 1874 – 4 June 1956), also credited as Agnete Seidelin-Raunkiaer, was a Danish botanist noted for her study of freshwater plants. She was married to Danish botanist Christen C. Raunkiær.

== Works ==
- Seidelin, A. (1909) 5. Hippuridaceae, Halorrhagidaceae and Callitrichaceae, in The Structure and Biology of Arctic Flowering Plants, p. 295-332.
- Seidelin, A. (1912) Vegetationen i nogle Vandhuller i Nordvendsyssel. Botanisk Tidsskrift bd. 33.
- Wesenberg-Lund, C.; Steenberg, Carl Marinus; Raunkiær, Agnete (Seidelin); Petersen, Johannes Boye; Sand, Mads Jensen (1917). Furesøstudier en bathmymetrisk botanisk zoologisk undersøgelse af Mølleaaens Søer. A. F. Høst & søn.
- Westergaard, Mogens; Raunkiær, Agnete Seidelin (1940). Studies on cytology and sex determination in polyploid forms of Melandrium album. E. Munksgaard. OCLC 20282690.
