= Arnarulunnguaq =

Greenlandic Inuit explorer (1896–1933)

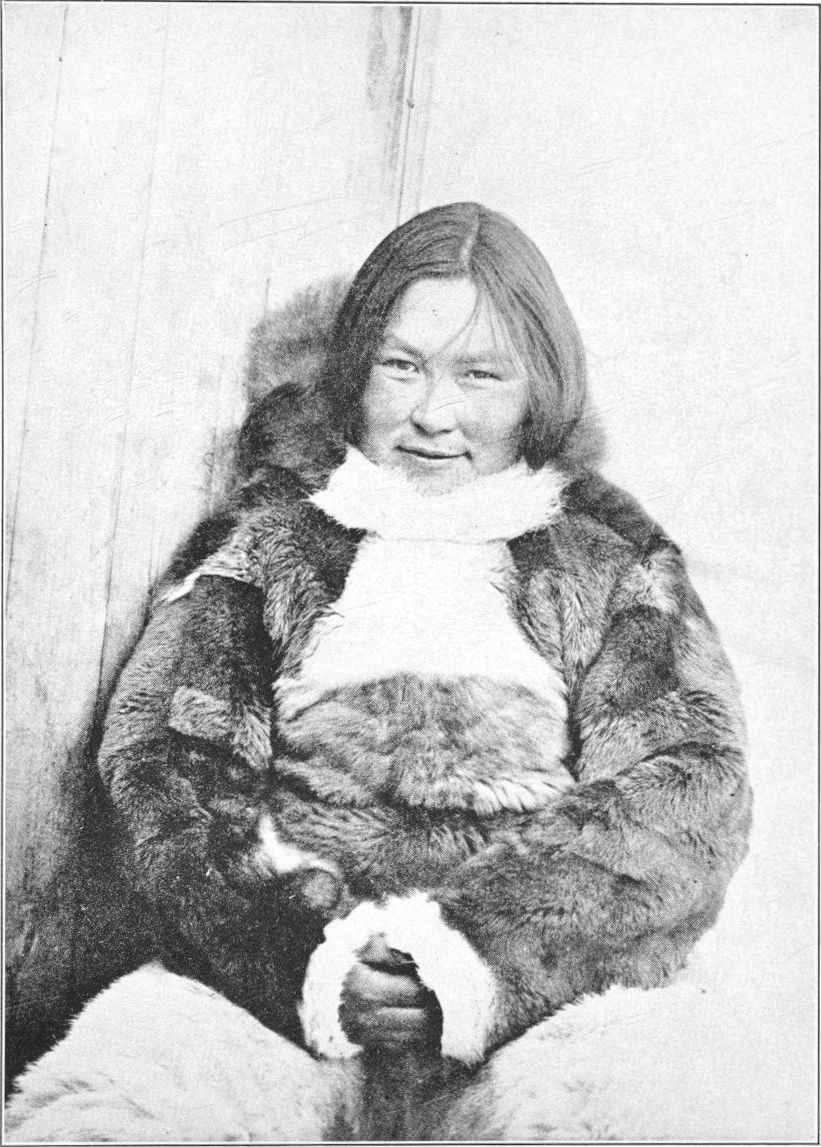
- Arnarulunnguaq on the Fifth Thule Expedition (1921–1924)
- Born: 1896; Thule, Greenland
- Died: 2 October 1933 (aged 36–37); Thule, Greenland
- Known for: Participation in the Fifth Thule Expedition (1921–1924)
- Spouse: Iggiannguaq
- Awards: Silver Medal of Merit

Arnarulunnguaq F.M.2 (Greenlandic pronunciation: [ɑn.nɑ.ʁu.luŋ.ŋu.ɑq] AR-nar-oo-LUUNG-oo-ahk; 1896 – 2 October 1933), a Native Greenlander, was a key member of Knud Rasmussen's Fifth Thule Expedition (1921–1924) which crossed the Northwest Passage by dog sled. She was one of the two who accompanied Rasmussen from the Hudson Bay to Alaska, preparing meals and keeping skins and furs in order throughout the two-year journey. As a result, she was the first woman to complete the long Arctic journey from Greenland to the Pacific.

== Biography ==
=== Early life ===
Born in Thule in 1896, Arnarulunnguaq (meaning "little girl") was the daughter of the Greenlandic hunter Uumaaq and his wife Aleqasersuaq. After her father died when she was only seven years old, as the youngest child she experienced a difficult childhood, helping to provide for the family.

According to Rasmussen, her family had initially decided to murder her, a practice among the Inuit when resources were insufficient to support everyone: she was required to put a rope around her own neck to show her acquiescence; but her brother Ajako began to cry and her mother decided not to go through with the killing.

Arnarulunnguaq saw this event as a kind of rebirth.

=== Fifth Thule Expedition ===
Among the Arctic Inuit chosen by Knud Rasmussen to participate in his Fifth Expedition were the hunter Iggiannguaq and his wife Arnarulunnguaq. Shortly before their departure, Iggiannguaq died of pneumonia but Arnarulunnguaq insisted on continuing, explaining to Rasmussen: "Before it was you who needed me, now it's me who needs you."

After the first stage of the expedition had reached the Hudson Bay, most of the party returned home. Rasmussen, Arnarulunnguaq and her cousin Qaavigarsuaq Miteq, a hunter, continued by dog sled for the next two years, proceeding under extreme conditions over unexplored Arctic territory all the way to the Bering Strait.

Arnarulunnguaq proved to be a vital member of the group; brought up as a hunter's wife and companion, she not only took care of preparing meals but created and maintained skins for clothing and helped build shelters of peat. During the journey, Arnarulunnguaq produced a number of drawings, including detailed images of Inuit women's tattoos.

Summing up her positive influence, Rasmussen tells us that Arnarulunnguaq had "that good humour about her that only a woman can instil [and was as] entertaining and courageous as any man when we were out on our journey."

=== Later life and death ===
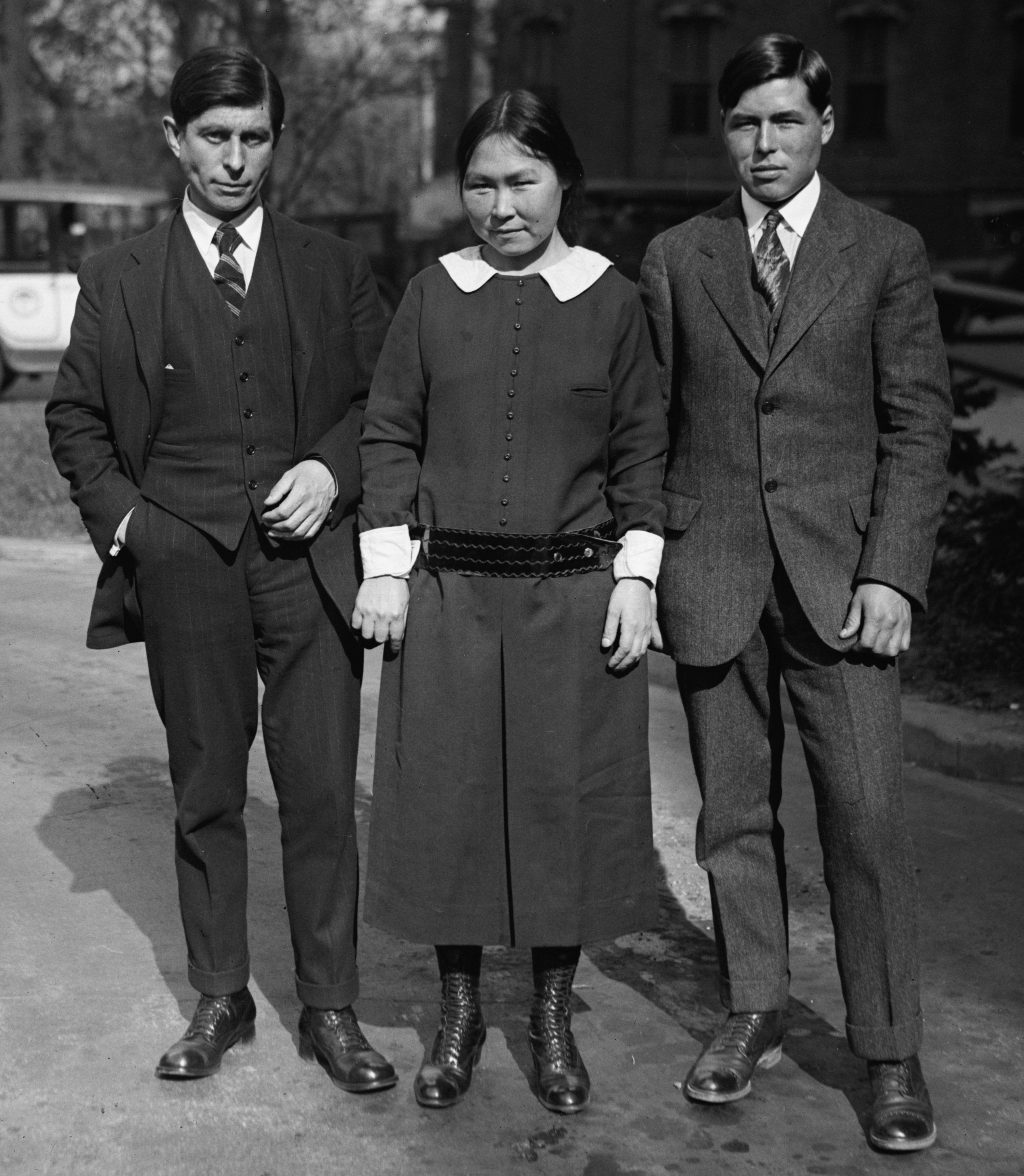
Rasmussen, Arnarulunnguaq and Miteq, 1924

In late 1924, Rasmussen, Arnarulunnguaq and Miteq embarked on their return journey to Denmark via the United States.

On arriving in Copenhagen, Arnarulunnguaq was diagnosed as suffering from tuberculosis and was hospitalized but she never fully recovered. Rasmussen visited her in hospital, honouring her with the Silver Medal of Merit which she had difficulty accepting, although she was said to deserve it as much as anyone.

In 1925, Arnarulunnguaq returned to Thule where she died on 2 October 1933, aged about 36 or 37.

=== Legacy ===
She will appear on a 2028 Danish krone banknote (the krone is also used in Greenland).. In 2026, a bacterium isolated from permafrost from the Kap København Formation in Northern Greenland was named after her.
