= Knud Rasmussen =

Greenlandic-Danish polar explorer and anthropologist (1879–1933)

- Kunuunnguaq
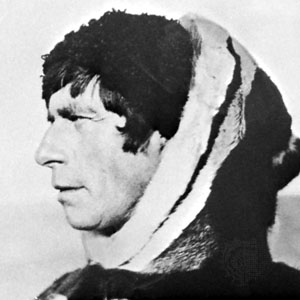
- Born: Knud Johan Victor Rasmussen; 7 June 1879; Jacobshavn, North Greenland
- Died: 21 December 1933 (aged 54); Copenhagen, Denmark
- Known for: Polar exploration and eskimology
- Spouse: Dagmar Andersen (m. 1908)
- Children: 3
- Awards: Daly Medal; Founder's Medal; Hans Egede Medal; Vega Medal
- Scientific career
- Fields: Anthropology

Knud Johan Victor Rasmussen (/ˈræsmʊsən/; 7 June 1879 – 21 December 1933) was a Greenlandic-Danish polar explorer and anthropologist. He has been called the "father of Eskimology" (now often known as Inuit Studies or Greenlandic and Arctic Studies) and was the first European to cross the Northwest Passage via dog sled. He remains well known in Greenland, Denmark and among Canadian Inuit.

== Early years ==
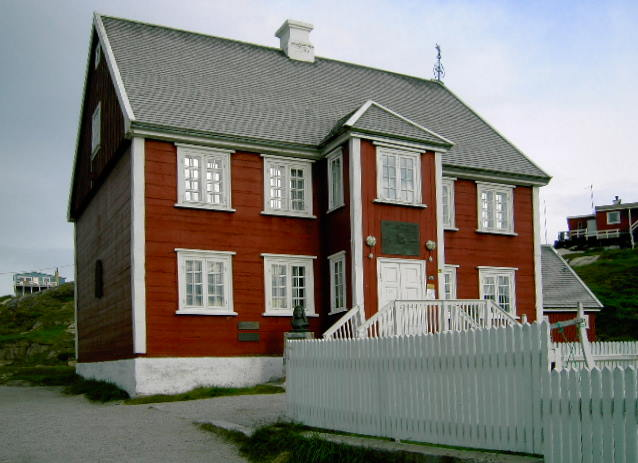
Rasmussen family house in Ilulissat

Rasmussen was born in Jacobshavn (now called Ilulissat), Greenland, the son of a Danish missionary, the vicar Christian Rasmussen, and an Inuk–Danish mother, Lovise Rasmussen (née Fleischer). He had two siblings.

Rasmussen spent his early years in Greenland among the Kalaallit where he learnt to speak Kalaallisut, hunt, drive dog sleds and live in harsh Arctic conditions. "My playmates were native Greenlanders; from the earliest boyhood I played and worked with the hunters, so even the hardships of the most strenuous sledge-trips became pleasant routine for me."

He was later educated in Lynge, North Zealand, Denmark. Between 1898 and 1900 he pursued an unsuccessful career as an actor and opera singer.

== Career ==
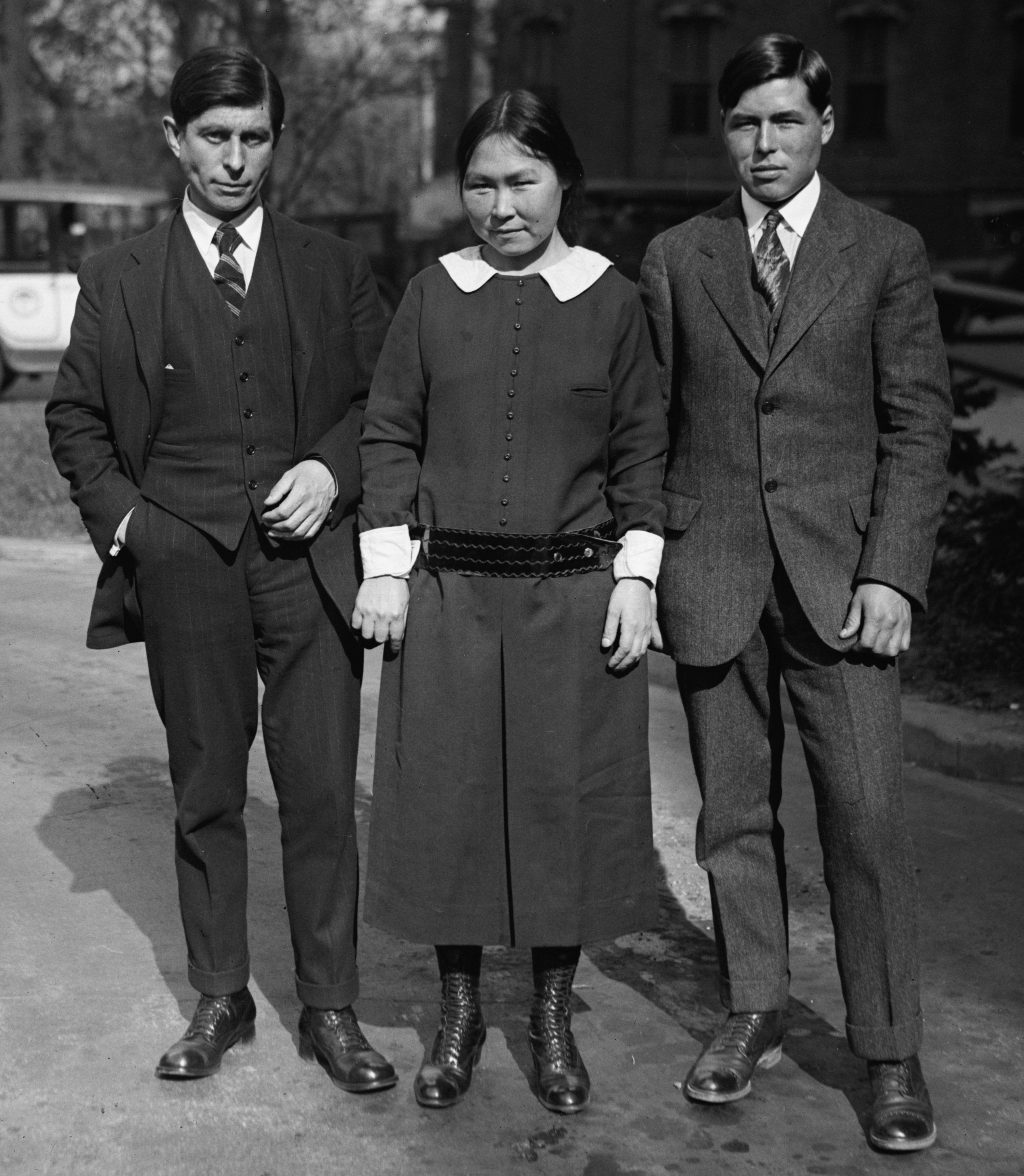
Rasmussen, Mrs. Arnarulunnguaq and Mr. Meetek, 1924

He went on his first expedition in 1902–1904, known as The Danish Literary Expedition, with Jørgen Brønlund, Harald Moltke and Ludvig Mylius-Erichsen, to examine Inuit culture. After returning home, he went on a lecture circuit and wrote The People of the Polar North (1908), a combination travel journal and scholarly account of Inuit folklore. In 1908, he married Dagmar Andersen.

In 1910, Rasmussen and friend Peter Freuchen established Thule Trading Station in North Star Bay near Mount Dundas in Greenland as a trading base. The name "Thule" was chosen because it was the most northerly trading post in the world, literally the "Ultima Thule". The station became the home base for a series of seven expeditions, known as the Thule Expeditions, between 1912 and 1933.

=== The Thule expeditions ===
The First Thule Expedition (1912, Rasmussen and Freuchen) aimed to test Robert Peary's claim that a channel divided Peary Land from Greenland. They proved this was not the case in a remarkable 1,000 kilometres (620 mi) journey across the inland ice that almost killed them. Clements Markham, president of the Royal Geographical Society, called the journey the "finest ever performed by dogs." Freuchen wrote personal accounts of this journey (and others) in Vagrant Viking (1953) and I Sailed with Rasmussen (1958). In 1915, he translated Mathias Storch's novel Singnagtugaq into Danish (The Dream in English; translated as En grønlænders drøm), the first novel written in Greenlandic.

The Second Thule Expedition (1916–1918) was larger with a team of seven men, which set out to map a little-known area of Greenland's north coast. This journey was documented in Rasmussen's account Greenland by the Polar Sea (1921). The trip was beset with two fatalities, the only in Rasmussen's career, namely Thorild Wulff and Hendrik Olsen. The Third Thule Expedition (1919) was depot-laying for Roald Amundsen's polar drift in the ship Maud. The Fourth Thule Expedition (1919–1920) was in east Greenland where Rasmussen spent several months collecting ethnographic data near Angmagssalik.

Rasmussen's "greatest achievement" was the massive Fifth Thule Expedition (1921–1924) which was designed to "attack the great primary problem of the origin of the Eskimo race." A ten-volume account (The Fifth Thule Expedition 1921–1924 (1946)) of ethnographic, archaeological and biological data was collected, and many artifacts are still on display in museums in Denmark. The team of seven first went to eastern Arctic Canada where they began collecting specimens, taking interviews (including the shaman Aua, who told him of Uvavnuk), and excavating sites.

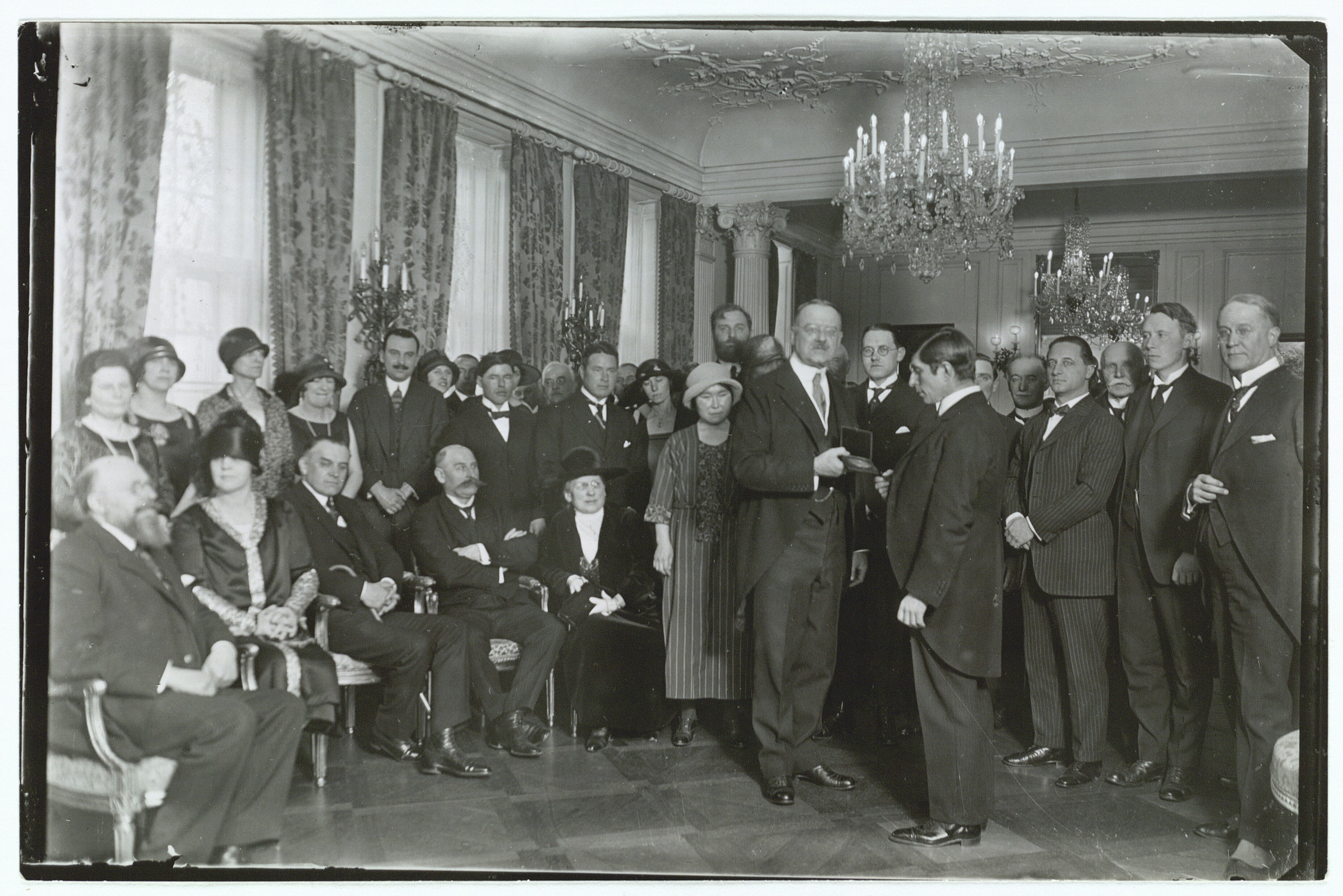
Knud Rasmussen receives Charley P. Darby's gold medal from US ambassador John Dyneley Prince.

Rasmussen left the team and traveled for 16 months with two Inuit hunters by dog sled across North America to Nome, Alaska, and for less than 48 hours (because of visa problems) to Russia, where he interviewed a few of the local Inuit, the Yupiks. He found they did indeed speak the same language as other Inuit. (Bown, pp 257-259). He was the first European to cross the Northwest Passage by dog sled. His journey is recounted in Across Arctic America (1927), considered today a classic of polar expedition literature. This trip has also been called the "Great Sled Journey" and was dramatized in the Canadian film The Journals of Knud Rasmussen (2006).

For the next seven years, Rasmussen traveled between Greenland and Denmark giving lectures and writing. In 1931, he went on the Sixth Thule Expedition, designed to consolidate Denmark's claim on a portion of eastern Greenland that was contested by Norway.

The Seventh Thule Expedition (1933) was meant to continue the work of the sixth, but Rasmussen contracted pneumonia after an episode of food poisoning attributed to eating kiviaq, dying a few weeks later in Copenhagen at the age of 54. During this expedition Rasmussen worked on the film The Wedding of Palo, which Rasmussen wrote the screenplay for. The film was directed by Friedrich Dalsheim and completed in 1934 under the Danish title Palos brudefærd.

== Honours ==
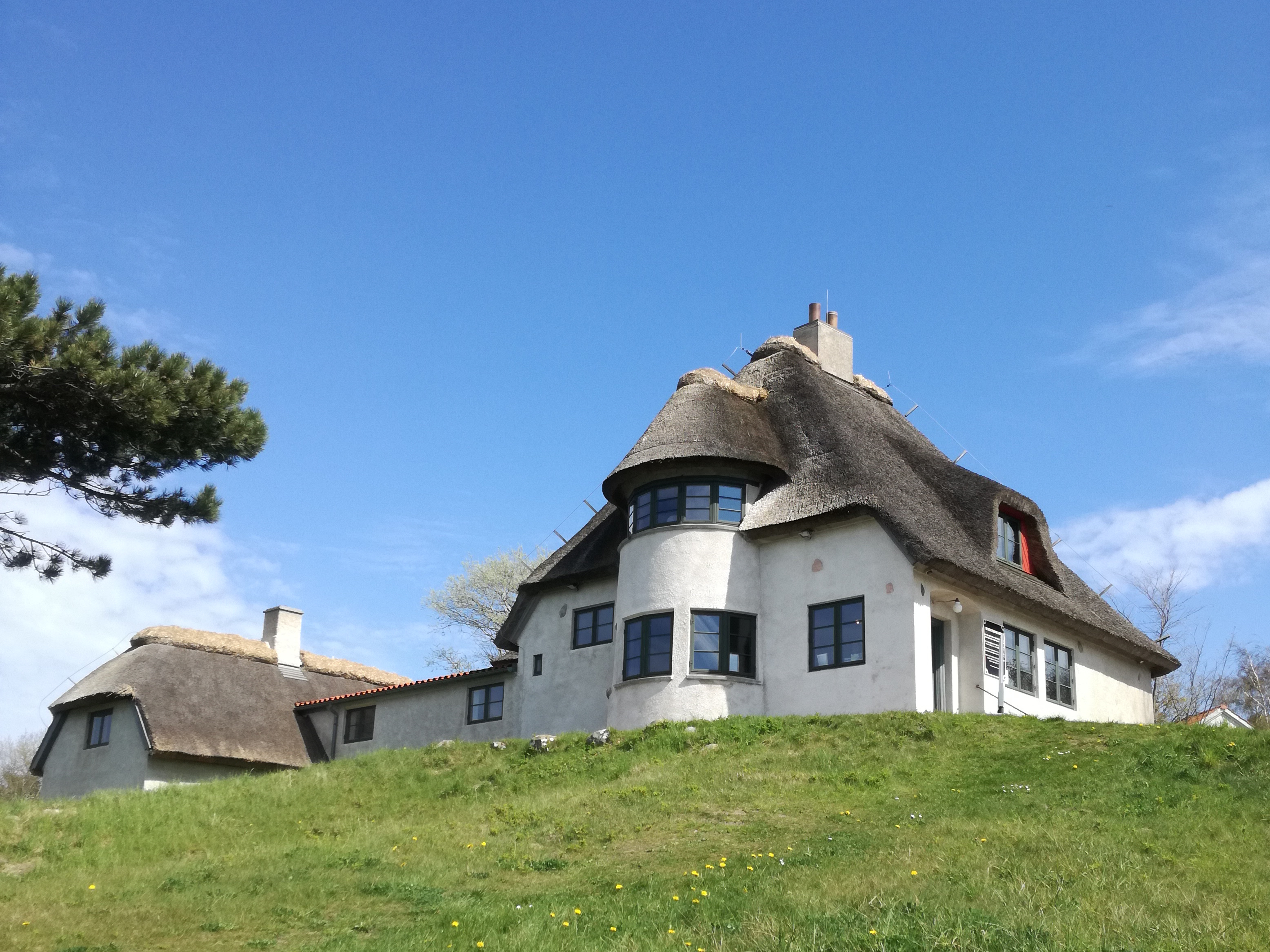
Knud Rasmussen House, now a museum, in Hundested, Sjælland, Denmark

In addition to several capes and glaciers, Knud Rasmussen Range in Greenland is named after him, as is the Knud Rasmussen-class patrol vessel and its lead ship, the HDMS Knud Rasmussen.

He was awarded an Honorary Fellowship from the American Geographical Society in 1912, and its Daly Medal in 1924. The Royal Geographical Society awarded him their Founder's Medal in 1923 and the Royal Danish Geographical Society their Hans Egede Medal in 1924. He was made honorary doctor at the University of Copenhagen in 1924, and the University of St Andrews in 1927.

== Bibliography ==
- Under Nordenvindens Svøbe (1906)
- Lapland (1907)
- Menschen: Ein Jahr bei ben Nachbarn des Nordpols (1907)
- The People of the Polar North. (1908)
- Greenland by the Polar Sea. (1921)
- Eskimo Folk Tales. (1921)
- Across Arctic America. (1927)
- In der heimat des polarmenschen; die zweite Thule-expedition, 1916-18
- Ultima Thule: Grönländische Reiseerlebnisse (1920)
- The Fifth Thule Expedition
  - Intellectual Culture of the Iglulik Eskimos. (1929) Also from the Internet Archive
  - Observations on the Intellectual Culture of the Caribou Eskimos. (1930)
  - Iglulik and Caribou Eskimo Texts (1930)
  - The Netsilik Eskimos: Social Life and Spiritual Culture (1931)
  - Intellectual Culture of the Copper Eskimos (1932)
  - Knud Rasmussen's Posthumous Notes on East Greenland Legends and Myths (1939)
- Alaskan Eskimo Words (1941) (posthumous)
- The Mackenzie Eskimos (1942) (posthumous)
- The Alaskan Eskimos (1952) (posthumous)
- Beyond the High Hills: A Book of Eskimo Poems (1961)
- The Bear in the Ice Hole (1965)
- Eskimo Poems from Canada and Greenland (1973)
