= Willi Dansgaard =

Danish paleoclimatologist (1922–2011)

- Born: 30 August 1922; Copenhagen, Denmark
- Died: 8 January 2011 (aged 88); Copenhagen, Denmark
- Citizenship: Danish
- Scientific career
- Fields: Paleoclimatology
- Workplaces: Copenhagen University

Willi Dansgaard (30 August 1922 – 8 January 2011) was a Danish paleoclimatologist. He was Professor Emeritus of Geophysics at the University of Copenhagen and a member of the Royal Danish Academy of Science and Letters, the Royal Swedish Academy of Sciences, the Icelandic Academy of Sciences, and the Danish Geophysical Society.

== Early life and career ==
Dansgaard grew up in Copenhagen, to parents who owned an engraving shop. In 1947, he graduated from the University of Copenhagen, winning a gold medal for his thesis on X-ray dosimetry.

After several years of research, including some at sites in Greenland, Dansgaard returned to the University of Copenhagen's Biophysics Laboratory, where he developed its mass spectrometer to analyse water isotopes. According to his student Jørgen Peder Steffensen:

In June 1952, Dansgaard made a discovery that came to influence the rest of his scientific career. He discovered that it was possible to determine the temperature of the precipitating clouds by analysing the stable isotopic composition of rain water. In the following 12 years, he systematically collected water samples from all over the world in collaboration with the Danish East Asia Company, contacts in Greenland, a French expedition under Paul Emile Victor and later the International Atomic Energy Agency and World Meteorological Organization.

== Overview ==
Dansgaard was the first paleoclimatologist to demonstrate that measurements of the trace isotopes oxygen-18 and deuterium in accumulated glacier ice could be used as an indicator of past climate. Dansgaard was the first to note deuterium excess, or a water sample's deviation from the global meteoric water line (GMWL) in ice cores. He found that the kinetic differences between hydrogen-1 and deuterium related to the temperature of source water, and the absolute humidity.

He was the first scientist to extract palaeoclimatic information from the American Camp Century ice core from Greenland drilled by the US army Cold Regions Research and Engineering Laboratory (CRREL). Dansgaard also took a leading role in the drilling of the first ice core to bedrock for scientific reasons, the DYE-3 core from South Greenland, 1,400 kilometres (870 mi) from the Camp Century. Confirming findings from the analysis of the Camp Century ice core, the DYE-3 climate profile documented the existence of rapid climate change, during and at the end of the last glacial. The repeated events of abrupt climate change during the glacial are named after Willi Dansgaard and his Swiss colleague, Hans Oeschger, and are known as Dansgaard–Oeschger events.

== Awards ==
- 1971 Hans Egede Medal
- 1975 Swedish Society for Anthropology and Geography's Vega medal
- 1976 Seligman Crystal from the International Glaciological Society
- 1995 Royal Swedish Academy of Sciences Crafoord Prize
- 1996 Tyler Prize for Environmental Achievement, 1996
