= Pipaluk Freuchen =

Greenlandic-Danish-Swedish writer (1918–1999)

- Portrait by Ingrid Vang Nyman; Arktisk Institut
- Born: Pipaluk Jette Tukuminguaq Kasaluk Palika Freuchen; 15 March 1918 Uummannaq, Greenland
- Died: 8 April 1999 (aged 81) Nykøbing Falster, Denmark
- Occupation: Writer
- Notable works: Ivik, den faderløse

Pipaluk Freuchen (15 March 1918 – 8 April 1999) was a Danish-Greenlandic-Swedish writer, best known for her children's book Ivik, den faderløse, which is also known by its English title Eskimo Boy. She was also the daughter of the explorer Peter Freuchen.

== Early life ==
Pipaluk Jette Tukuminguaq Kasaluk Palika Freuchen was born on 15 March 1918 in Uummannaq, Greenland. Her father was the Danish Arctic explorer and adventurer Peter Freuchen, her mother, Navarana Mequpaluk, a Greenlandic Inuk woman whom he married in 1911. They had two children, Mequsaq (born 1915) and Pipaluk. In a 1945 article in the Swedish-American newspaper Vestkusten, Freuchen recalled living a traditional Inuit lifestyle. In 1919 the family moved to Denmark, but returned to Greenland two years later, leaving Freuchen with her father's parents in Denmark. Her mother died in 1921 from influenza. Freuchen was brought up as part of the Lauridsen family after her father married Magdalene Lauridsen in 1924. Peter Freuchen wrote about their lives together in Arctic Adventure: My Life in the Frozen North (1935).

In 1944 Freuchen fled from Nazi occupied Denmark to Sweden with her father and married Bengt Häger, a Swedish choreographer and academic. They had a daughter named Navarana. She returned to her father's home town of Nykøbing Falster in Denmark in 1952. Häger remarried in 1954.

== Writing ==
Freuchen's wrote Ivik: den faderløse ("Ivik the Fatherless") in Danish and it has been translated into several languages, including English as Eskimo Boy, and German as Ivik der Vaterlose. It was published in Sweden as part of the Robinson Series for children aged nine to eleven by Geber Förlag. In the book, Ivik's father is killed by a walrus on a hunting trip and Ivik has to save his family from starvation. Ivik ultimately ends up killing a polar bear. The book was noted in an Association on American Indian Affairs bibliography for its "unrelenting realism". Reviewing the book, the Lexington Herald described it as "permeated with the spirit of Eskimo culture", while the Manchester Guardian described the book as "a little masterpiece of writing". The Swedish edition was illustrated by Freuchen's step-cousin Ingrid Vang Nyman, who was living in Sweden and had illustrated Freuchen's story Julafton bland eskimåer (Christmas Eve among Eskimos) for Dagens Nyheter in 1944.

Inaluk, her second book, about a Greenlandic girl going to school in Denmark, was published in a Swedish translation. The Swedish library magazine Biblioteksbladet was disappointed and described it as "a completely ordinary girl's book" and the central character as "grossly idealised".

Freuchen also worked as a journalist and travelled with her father.

== Later life ==
Freuchen died on 8 April 1999.

== Books ==
- Ivik, den faderløse (Arthur Jensens Forlag, 1944), English translation Eskimo Boy (Lothrop, Lee & Shepard, 1951)
- Inaluk (Almqvist & Wiksell/Geber Förlag, 1954)
- Bogen om Peter Freuchen (Editor, Forlaget Fremad, 1958)
