= Dagmar Freuchen-Gale =

Danish illustrator, writer and editor

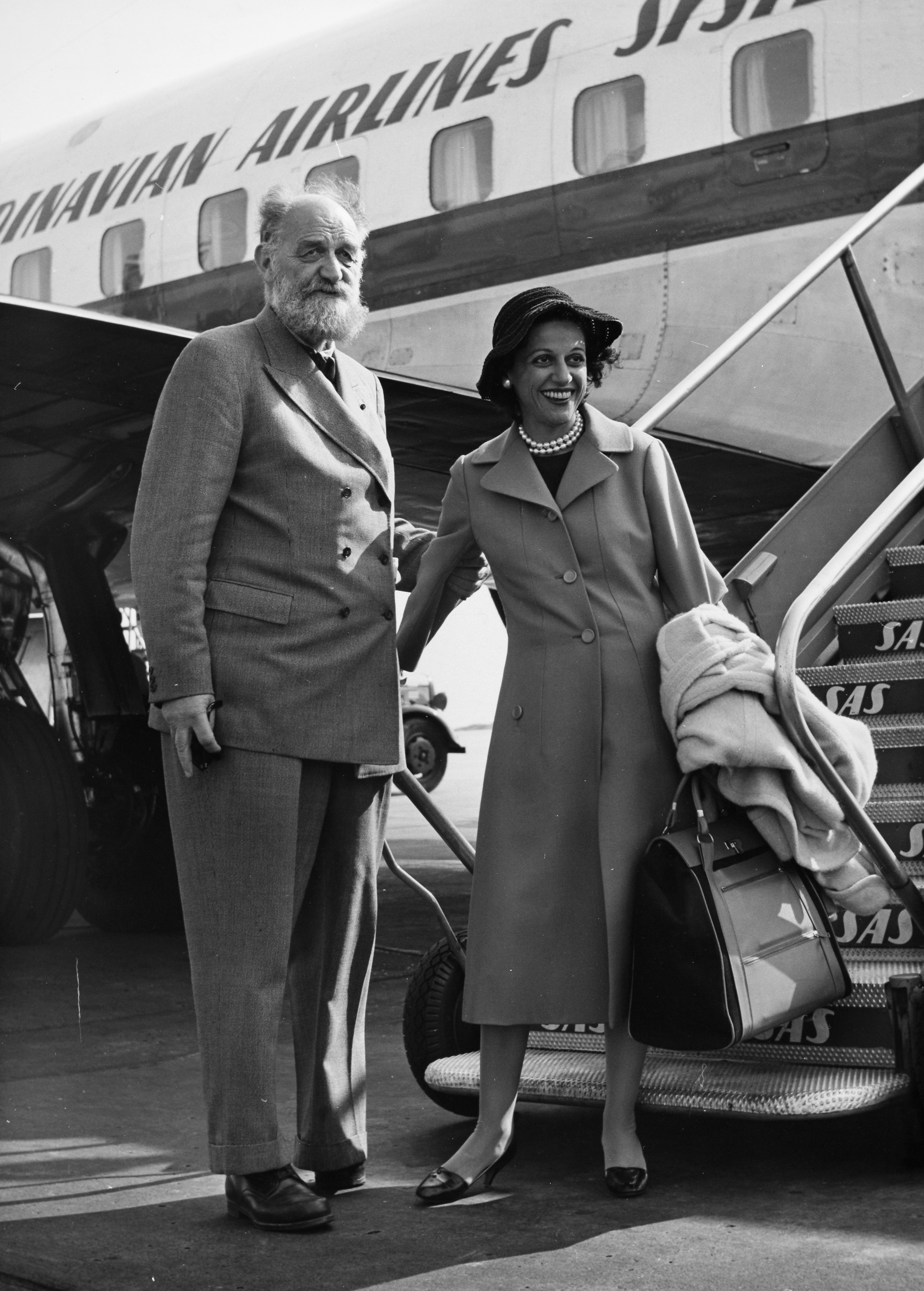
- Freuchen-Gale with her husband Peter Freuchen in the 1950s
- Born: Dagmar Cohn; 30 June 1907; Kongens Lyngby, Denmark
- Died: 9 March 1991 (aged 83); Denmark
- Known for: Vogue and Harpers magazine fashion illustrations
- Spouses: Muller; Peter Freuchen (m. 1945; died 1957) Henry Gale (m. 1967; died 1969)

Dagmar Freuchen-Gale (née Cohn; 30 June 1907 – 9 March 1991) was a Danish illustrator, writer and editor.

== Early life and education ==
Freuchen-Gale was born Dagmar Cohn in Kongens Lyngby, Denmark, to Hans Cohn and Betty Johanne Neustadt. Her parents were Jewish and were members of The Mosaic Religious Society. Freuchen-Gale left Lyngby in 1938 to go to New York.

== Career ==
Freuchen-Gale was an artist and well known as a fashion illustrator, working for magazines such as Vogue and Harper's Bazaar. In April 1947, Freuchen-Gale illustrated the cover of Vogue which presented new couture house Christian Dior. At the end of the 1940s Freuchen-Gale began to teach fashion illustration at the Art Students League, and continuing there for 20 years.

She edited several books written by her second husband Peter Freuchen, an explorer and author. In 1968, she wrote Cookbook of the Seven Seas, title inspired by Freuchen's book, Book of the Seven Seas.

== Personal life ==
Freuchen-Gale married three times. Her first husband, a Danish man named Muller, was killed during World War II while serving with the American army in the Pacific.

She met her second husband, Peter Freuchen, on 24 December 1944 in New York at the home of some Danish friends. They married the following year. Freuchen was a well known Danish author and Arctic explorer. Beginning in 1945, they lived in New York City and maintained a second home in Noank, Connecticut on Chesbro Street, overlooking Long Island Sound. They appeared together in a well known photo by Irving Penn showing Freuchen with a beard in a massive fur coat. Freuchen often travelled for his work during their marriage but is reported to have written home every day and sent a copy of each letter to the Danish Royal Library, to be opened 50 years after his death, in 2007.

Freuchen-Gale joined her husband only once in his travels, on an expedition to Iceland, during which she served native meals including pickled whale blubber and seaweed. During their marriage, she became an expert on various cuisines from around the world. After her husband's death, Freuchen-Gale maintained the Noank home until 1963.

Freuchen-Gale's third marriage was to Henry Gale (d. 1969), an attorney from New York, in 1967. She returned to live in Denmark in the early 1970s.

== Works ==
- Peter Freuchen's Adventures in the Arctic, Julian Messner, Inc., New York, Copyright 1960. - (Editor)
- Peter Freuchen's Book of the Eskimos, Peter Freuchen Estate. Cleveland Ohio, Copyright 1961. - (Editor)
- Erindringer, 1963 - (Editor)
- Cookbook of the Seven Seas, 1968 - (Author)
