= Carlsberg Laboratory =

Scientific institute

Coordinates: 55.6658°N 12.5283°E

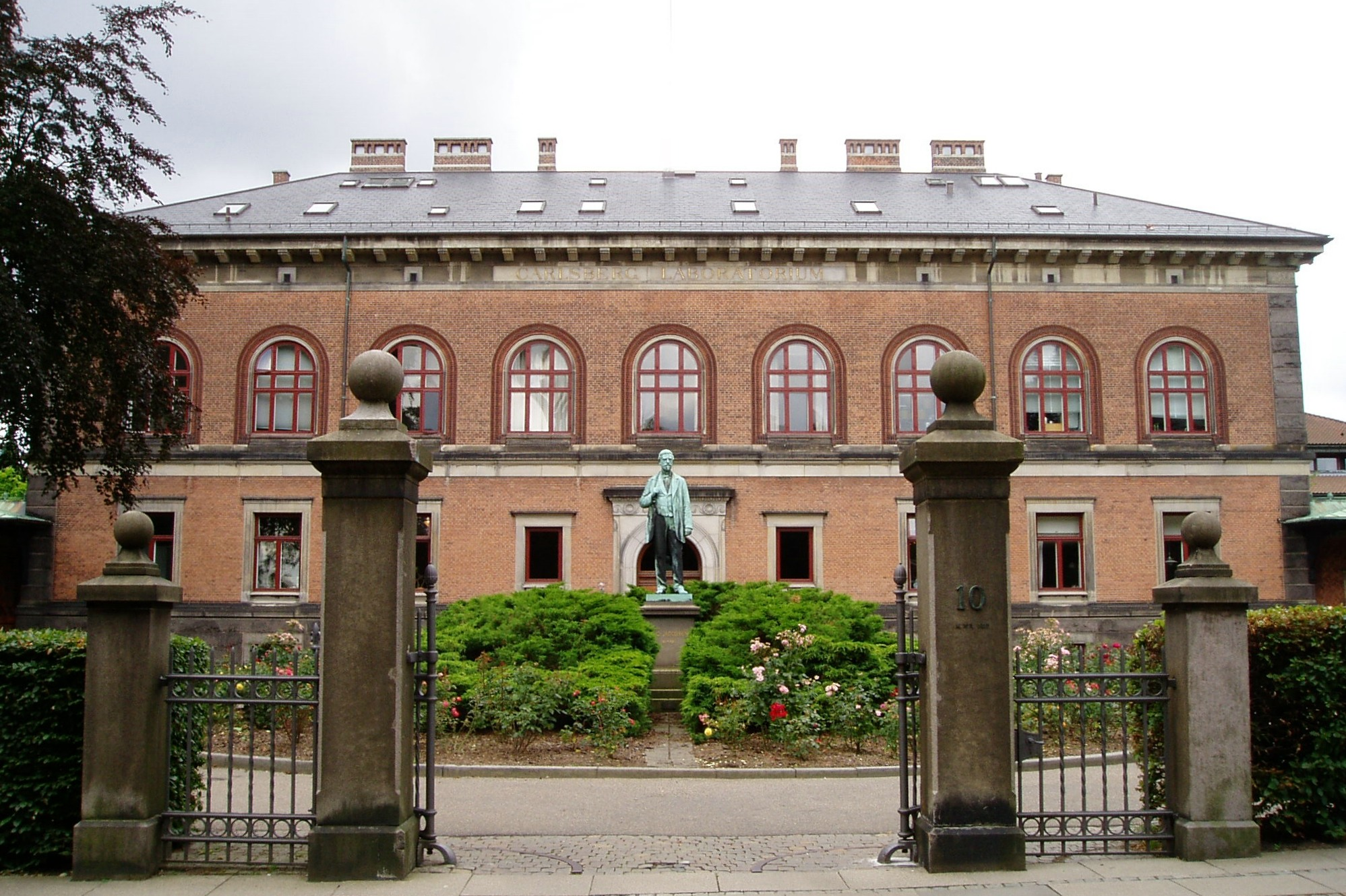
The Carlsberg Research Laboratory with a statue of its founder J. C. Jacobsen in the foreground

The Carlsberg Research Laboratory is a private scientific research center in Copenhagen, Denmark under the Carlsberg Foundation. It was founded in 1875 by J. C. Jacobsen, the founder of the Carlsberg brewery, with the purpose of advancing biochemical knowledge, especially relating to brewing. It featured a Department of Chemistry and a Department of Physiology. In 1972, the laboratory was renamed the Carlsberg Research Center and was transferred to the brewery.

== Overview ==
The Carlsberg Laboratory was known for isolating Saccharomyces carlsbergensis, the species of yeast responsible for lager fermentation, as well as introducing the concept of pH in acid–base chemistry. The Danish chemist Søren Peder Lauritz Sørensen introduced the concept of pH, a scale for measuring acidity and basicity of substances. While working at the Carlsberg Laboratory, he studied the effect of ion concentration on proteins, and understood the concentration of hydrogen ions was particularly important. To express the hydronium ion (H_{3}O^{+}) concentration in a solution, he devised a logarithmic scale known as the pH scale.

== Directors ==
Name	Period
Johan Kjeldahl	1876–1900
S. P. L. Sørensen	1901–1938
Kaj Ulrik Linderstrøm-Lang	1938–1959
Martin Ottesen	1959–1987
Klaus Bock	1988–2006
Jens Ø. Duus	2006–2011
Ole Hindsgaul	2011–2014
Birger Lindberg Møller	2014–present

== See also ==
- Emil Christian Hansen
- Kirstine Smith
- Carsten Olsen
- Carlsberg
- J. C. Jacobsen
- Carlsberg Foundation
- Søren Anton van der Aa Kühle
- Morten P. Meldal
