= Hans Egede Medal =

Geography award

The Hans Egede Medal is awarded by the Royal Danish Geographical Society for outstanding services to geography, "principally for geographical studies and research in the Polar lands." It was instituted in 1916 and named after Hans Egede, a Danish missionary who established a mission in Greenland.

== Recipients ==
Source: Royal Danish Geographical Society

- 1921: Peter Freuchen, Godfred Hansen, and Morten Pedersen Porsild
- 1924: Knud Rasmussen
- 1925: Roald Amundsen
- 1927: Lauge Koch
- 1932: Henry George Watkins and Therkel Mathiassen
- 1933: Ejnar Mikkelsen and Kaj Birket-Smith
- 1937: Hans Wilhelmsson Ahlmann
- 1947: Pálmi Hannesson
- 1951: Eigil Knuth
- 1955: Helge Larsen
- 1959: Vivian Fuchs
- 1960: Paul Siple
- 1971: Willi Dansgaard and Børge Fristrup
- 1976: Knud Ellitsgaard-Rasmussen and Jørgen Meldgaard
- 1980: Bent Fredskild
- 1982: Gunnar Østrem
- 1984: Trevor Lloyd
- 1986: Preben Gudmandsen
- 1992: Niels Steen Gundestrup
- 1996: Bent Hasholt and Johannes Krüger
- 2017: Bo Elberling for his contributions to research on the Arctic
- 2022: Dorthe Dahl-Jensen for her research into Earth’s climate history.

== See also ==
- List of geography awards
- Prizes named after people
