= Børge Fristrup =

Danish geographer

Børge Fristrup (15 April 1918 in Copenhagen - 19 March 1985) was a Danish geographer. He studied glaciology, specialising in the Greenland ice sheet, at the University of Copenhagen and at Stockholm University, receiving a Hans Egede Medal for his research in 1971.

== Bibliography ==
- Børge Fristrup: Indlandsisen (Rhodes Bogforlag, Copenhagen 1963)
- Børge Fristrup: The Greenland Ice Cap (Rhodes, Copenhagen 1966)
- Børge Fristrup: "Climatology and glaciology" (in: Danmarks Natur volume 10: Greenland and the Faroe Islands, Politikens Forlag 1971; ISBN 87-567-1497-1; pp. 131–176)
- Børge Fristrup: The Greenland Ice Cap (1986)
