= The Wedding of Palo =

1934 film by Friedrich Dalsheim

The Wedding of Palo is a 1934 Greenlandic-Danish film set in Greenland. The screen play was written by Greenlandic-Danish anthropologist Knud Rasmussen and directed by German Friedrich Dalsheim. Rasmussen died during production of the film in 1933 and the film was released in 1934 under the Danish title Palos brudefærd. The film portrays the Inuit culture of Greenland and the plot is centered on the selection of a marriage partner for the heroine Navarana and her two suitors, Palo and Samo.
