= Eskimology =

Complex of humanities sciences relating to Eskimos

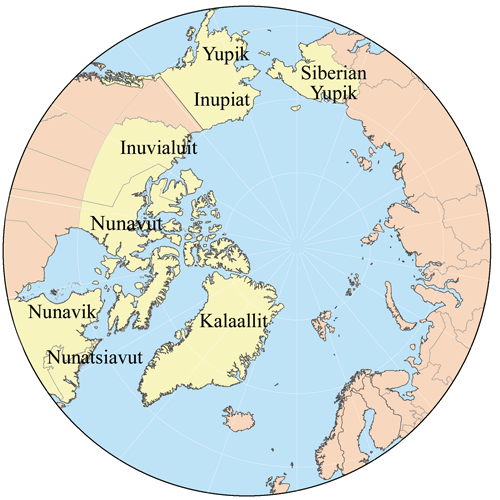
Map by the Inuit Circumpolar Council showing Inuit and Yupik homelands.: Unangam (not shown); Yupik peoples (Yupik, Siberian Yupik); Inuit peoples (Iñupiat, Inuvialuit, Nunavut, Nunavik, Nunatsiavut, Nunatuĸavut [not shown], Kalaallit)

Eskimology /ˌɛskɪˈmɒlədʒi/ or Inuitology is a field of humanities and sciences studying, in historical and comparative context, the languages, history, literature, folklore, culture, and ethnology of the speakers of Eskimo–Aleut languages: Inuit, Yupik and Aleut (or Unangam), sometimes collectively known as Eskimos. This includes ethnic groups from the Chukchi Peninsula on the far eastern tip of Siberia in Russia, through Alaska of the United States, Canada's Inuit Nunangat, including the Inuvialuit Settlement Region, Nunavut, Nunavik and Nunatsiavut, through NunatuKavut (but not the Gulf of St. Lawrence area), to Greenland of Denmark. Originally, an Eskimologist or Inuitologist was primarily a linguist or philologist who researched Eskimo or Inuit languages.

== History ==
Eskimology traces its beginning to the work of Hans Egede (1745) and David Crantz (1767) in Greenland. Eskimology has traditionally had a particular focus on Greenland studies owing to the long-standing relationship between Denmark and Greenland established in the early 18th century, and the academic discipline of Eskimology is today centered at the University of Copenhagen.

The term "Eskimology" was not common until 1967, when a genuine department was established and officially named the Department of Eskimology. From the late 1960s, Eskimology changed its focus toward increasingly contemporary and global political issues. In 2019, the department changed its name to Greenlandic and Arctic Studies Section (a section within the Department of Cross-Cultural and Regional Studies). The Greenlandic and Arctic Studies Section offers full BA and MA programmes. In these programmes, the study of the Greenlandic language and the socio-cultural issues of Greenland / Arctic are central.

== List of Eskimologists ==
- Knut Bergsland
- Ann Fienup-Riordan
- Michael Fortescue
- Sven Haakanson
- Erik Holtved
- Steven A. Jocobson
- Lawrence D. Kaplan
- Michael E. Krauss
- Margaret Lantis
- Jeff Leer
- Edna Ahgeak MacLean
- Georgy Menovshchikov
- Osihito Miyaoka
- Wendell H. Oswalt
- Knud Rasmussen "father of Eskimology"
- Jørgen Rischel
- Jerrold Sadock
- Wolf Seiler
- William Thalbitzer
- James W. VanStone

== See also ==
- Inuit Tapiriit Kanatami ("Inuit United with Canada")
- Alaska Native Language Center
