= Botanisk Tidsskrift =

Scientific journal (1866–1981)

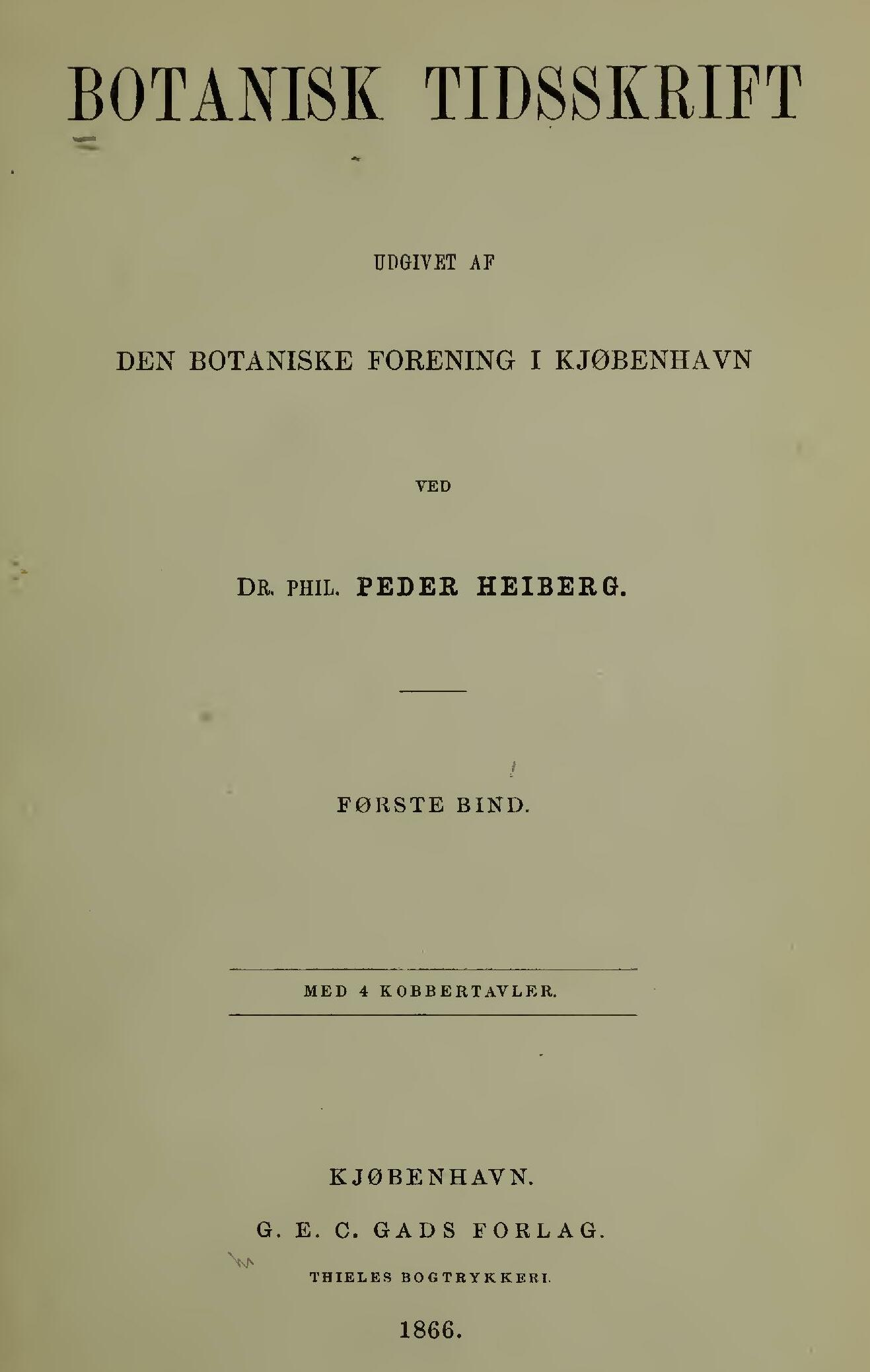
Title page

Botanisk Tidsskrift (standard abbreviation Bot. Tidsskr.) was a Danish mixed scientific and amateur journal concerning botany, issued in Copenhagen by the Danish Botanical Society. It was published from 1866 to 1980, when it fused with Botaniska Notiser, Friesia and Norwegian Journal of Botany to form the Nordic Journal of Botany.

Monographs were published in a parallel series, Dansk Botanisk Arkiv.

Full digital text of Botanisk Tidsskrift is available at Biodiversity Heritage Library.
