= Royal Danish Geographical Society =

Scientific society

The Royal Danish Geographical Society (RDGS, Danish: Det Kongelige Danske Geografiske Selskab) is a scientific society. The society aims to furthethe knowledge of the Earth and its inhabitants and to disseminate interest in the science of geography.

It was founded 18 November 1876 on the initiative of Professor E. D. Erslev. The society is based in Copenhagen, Denmark.

The society publishes an academic journal, the Geografisk Tidsskrift-Danish Journal of Geography.

== Awards and medals ==
The society awards several prizes and medals to those people who contribute to geographical science and research in areas of natural and cultural geography.

The society awards the Hans Egede Medal in silver 'preferably for geographical studies and research in the Arctic countries'. It was established in 1916 and named after Hans Egede, who was a Danish missionary in Greenland.
