= Eddy pumping =

Ocean dynamics

Eddy pumping is a component of mesoscale eddy-induced vertical motion in the ocean. It is a physical mechanism through which vertical motion is created from variations in an eddy's rotational strength. Cyclonic eddies lead primarily to upwelling, while anticyclonic eddies lead primarily to downwelling. It is a key mechanism driving biological and biogeochemical processes in the ocean such as algal blooms and the carbon cycle.

== The mechanism ==
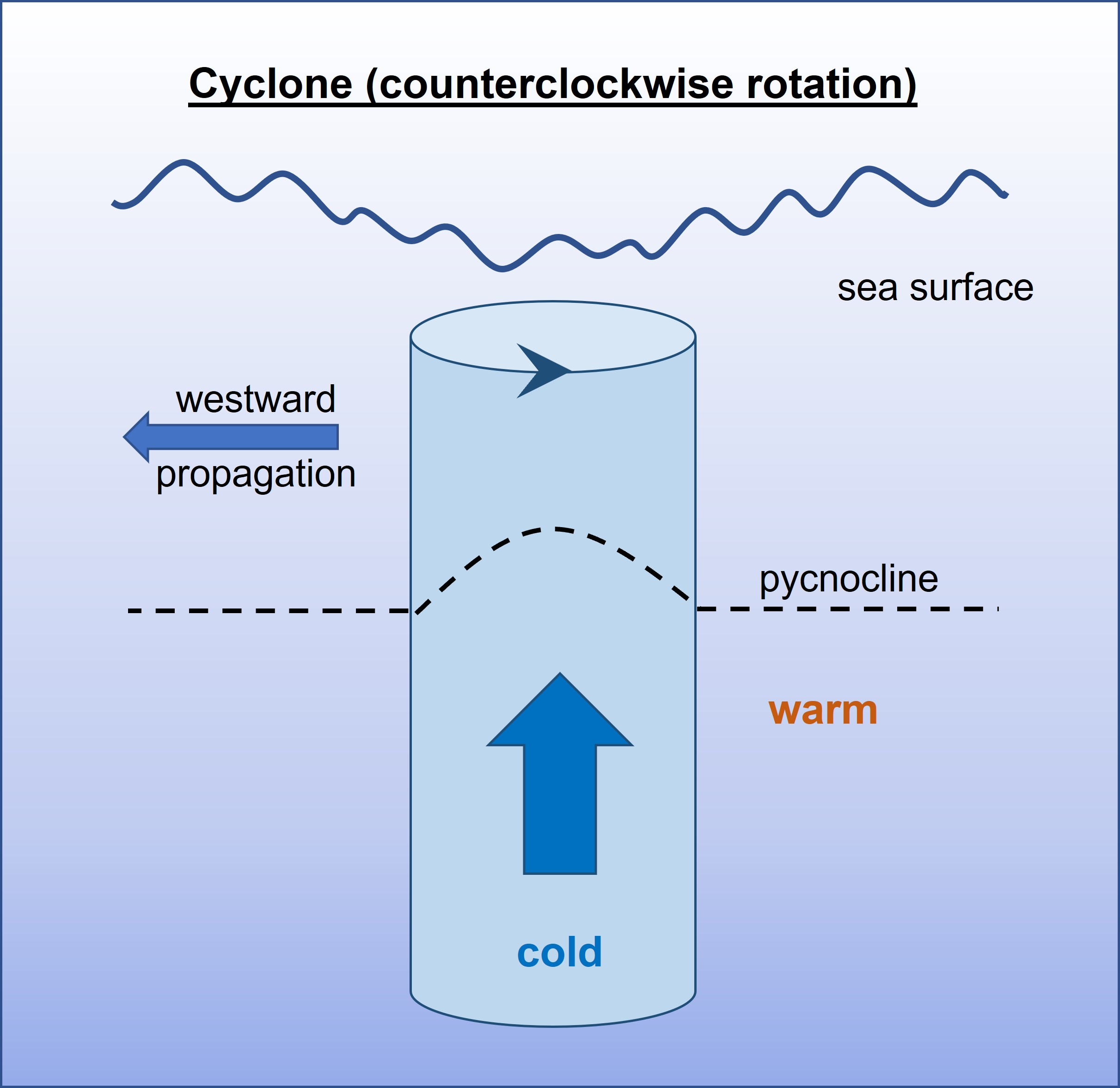
Conceptualised upwelling in an intensifying cyclonic eddy in the Northern Hemisphere. (Inspired from)

Eddies have a re-stratifying effect, which means they tend to organise the water in layers of different density. These layers are separated by surfaces called isopycnals. The re-stratification of the mixed layer is strongest in regions with large horizontal density gradients, known also as “fronts”, where the geostrophic shear and potential energy provide an energy source from which baroclinic and symmetric instabilities can grow. Below the mixed layer, a region of rapid density change (or pycnocline) separates the upper and lower water, hindering vertical transport.

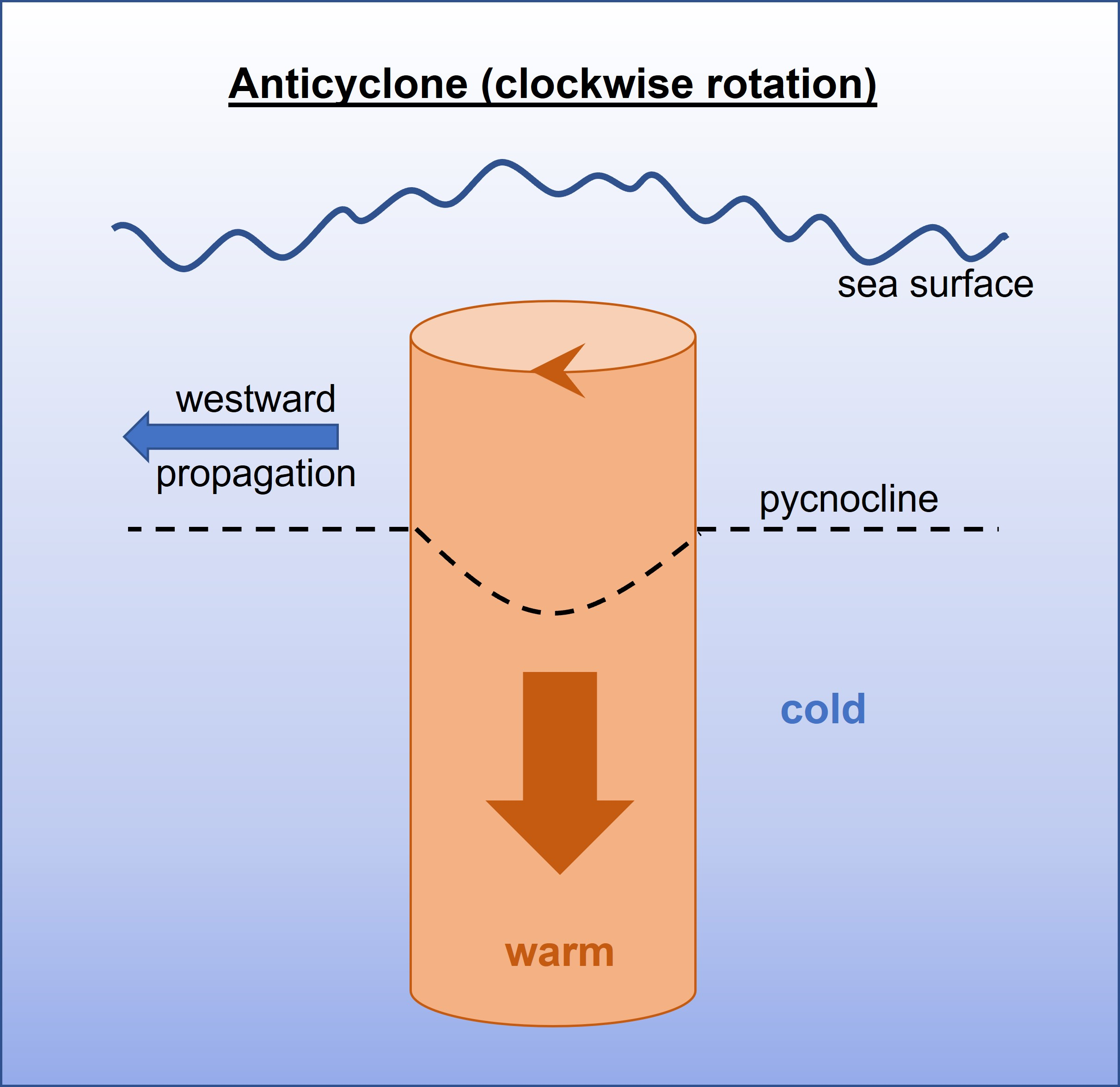
Conceptualised downwelling in an intensifying anticyclonic eddy in the Northern Hemisphere. (Inspired from)

Eddy pumping is a component of mesoscale eddy-induced vertical motion. Such vertical motion is caused by the deformation of the pycnocline. It can be conceptualised by assuming that ocean water has a density surface with mean depth averaged over time and space. This surface separates the upper ocean, corresponding to the euphotic zone, from the lower, deep ocean. When an eddy transits through, such density surface is deformed. Dependent on the phases of the lifespan of an eddy this will create vertical perturbations in different direction. Eddy lifespans are divided in formation, evolution and destruction. Eddy-pumping perturbations are of three types:

- Cyclones
- Anticyclones
- Mode-water eddies

=== Eddy-centric approach ===
Mode-water eddies have a complex density structure. Due to their shape, they cannot be distinguished from regular anticyclones in an eddy-centric (focused on the core of the eddy) analysis based on sea level height. Nonetheless, eddy pumping induced vertical motion in the euphotic zone of mode-water eddies is comparable to cyclones. For this reasons, only the cyclonic and anticyclonic mechanisms of eddy-pumping perturbations are explained.

==== Conceptual explanation based on sea-surface level ====
An intuitive description of this mechanism is what is defined as eddy-centric-analysis based on sea-surface level. In the Northern hemisphere, anticlockwise rotation in cyclonic eddies creates a divergence of horizontal surface currents due to the Coriolis effect, leading to a dampened water surface. To compensate the inhomogeneity of surface elevation, isopycnal surfaces are uplifted toward the euphotic zone and incorporation of deep ocean, nutrient-rich waters can occur.

==== Physical explanation ====
Conceptually, eddy pumping associates the vertical motion in the interior of eddies to temporal changes in eddy relative vorticity. The vertical motion created by the change in vorticity is understood from the characteristics of the water contained in the core of the eddy. Cyclonic eddies rotate anticlockwise (clockwise) in the Northern (Southern) hemisphere and have a cold core. Anticyclonic eddies rotate clockwise (anticlockwise) in the Northern (Southern) hemisphere and have a warm core. The temperature and salinity difference between the eddy core and the surrounding waters is the key element driving vertical motion. While propagating in horizontal direction, Cyclones and anticyclones “bend” the pycnocline upwards and downwards, respectively, induced by this temperature and salinity discrepancy. The extent of the vertical perturbation of the density surface inside the eddy (compared to the mean ocean density surface) is determined by the changes in rotational strength (relative vorticity) of the eddy.

Ignoring horizontal advection in the density conservation equation, the density changes due to changes in vorticity can be directly related to vertical transport. This assumption is coherent with the idea of vertical motion occurring at the eddy centre, in correspondence to variations of a perfectly circular flow.

$0={\partial \rho\over\partial t}+\nabla\cdot (\rho\textbf{u}) \longrightarrow {\partial\rho\over\partial t}=-{\partial\over\partial\!z}\rho w$

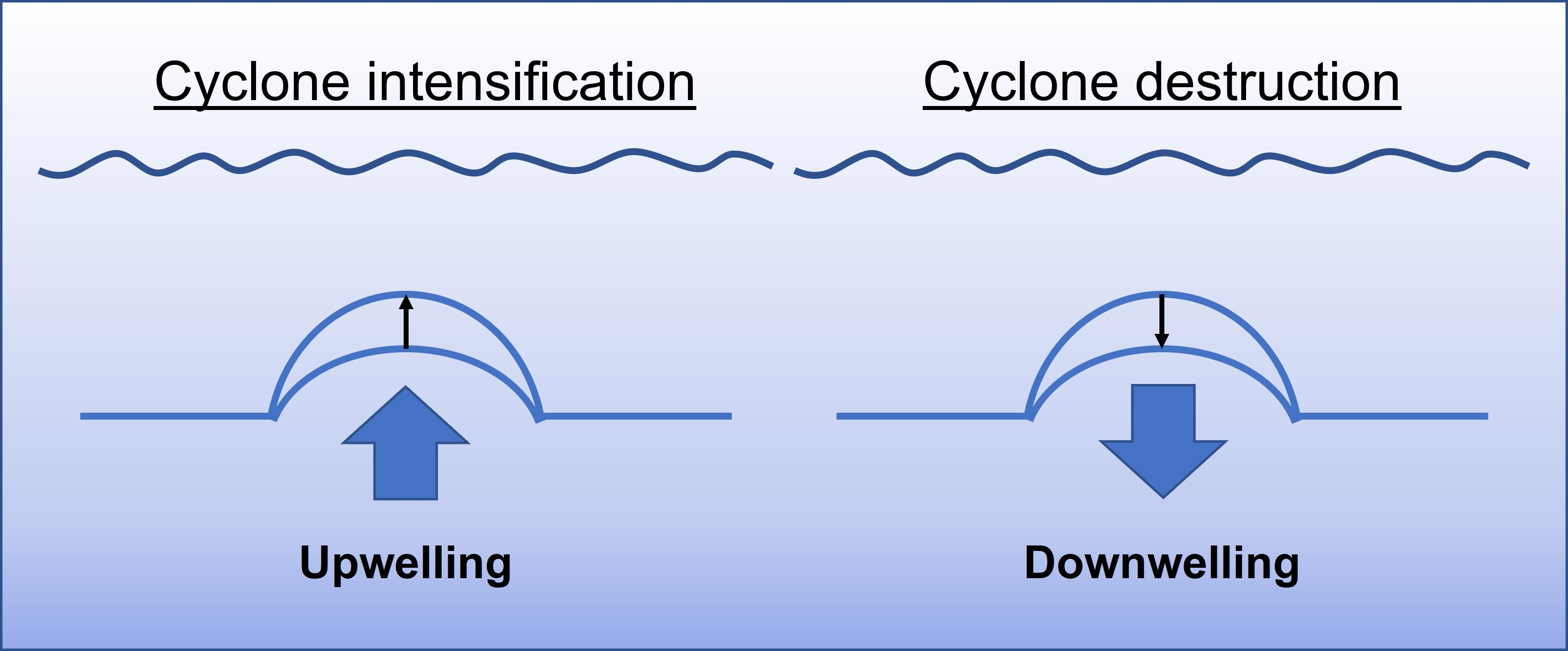
Conceptual description of the effect on the pycnocline and the vertical transport, as a cyclonic eddy intensifies and destructs. During the intensification, the pycnocline lifts, which generates upwelling. On the contrary, this process creates downwelling when the cyclone decays and the pycnocline returns to its original state.

Through such mechanism eddy pumping generates upwelling of cold, nutrient rich deep waters in cyclonic eddies and downwelling of warm, nutrient poor, surface water in anticyclonic eddies.

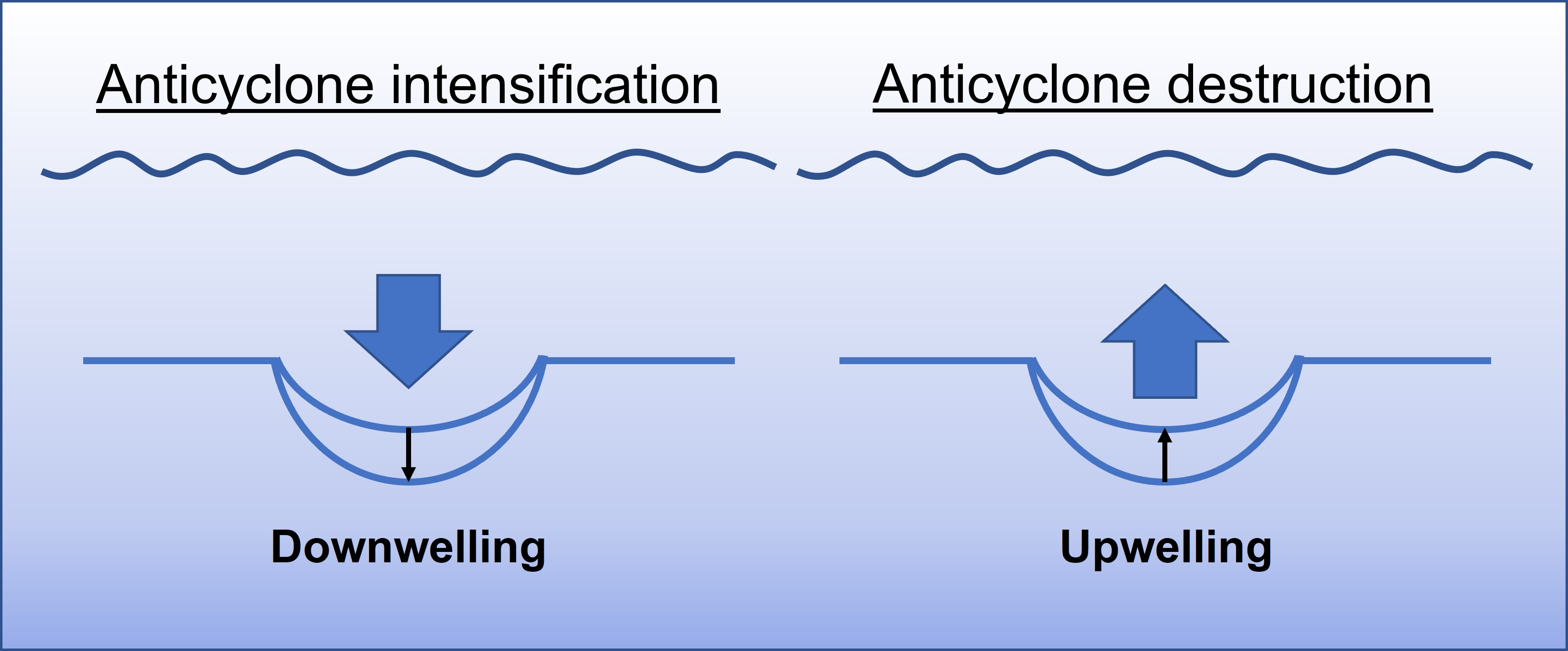
Conceptual description of the effect on the pycnocline and the vertical transport, as an anticyclonic eddy intensifies and destructs. During the intensification, the pycnocline moves down, which generates downwelling. On the contrary, this process creates downwelling when the anticyclone decays and the pycnocline returns to its original state.

==== Dependency on the phase of lifespan ====
Eddies weaken over time due to kinetic energy dissipation. As eddies form and intensify, the mechanisms mentioned above will strengthen and, as an increase in relative vorticity generates perturbations of the isopycnal surfaces, the pycnocline deforms. On the other hand, when eddies have aged and carry low kinetic energy, their vorticity diminishes and leads to eddy destruction. Such process opposes to eddy formation and intensification, as the pycnocline will return to its original position prior to the eddy-induced deformation. This means that the pycnocline will uplift in anticyclones and compress in cyclones, leading to upwelling and downwelling, respectively.

=== Eddy pumping characteristics ===
The direction of vertical motion in cyclonic and anticyclonic eddies is independent of the hemisphere. Observed vertical velocities of eddy pumping are in the order of one meter per day. However, there are regional differences. In regions where kinetic energy is higher, such as in the Western boundary current, eddies are found to generate stronger vertical currents than eddies in open ocean.

=== Limitations ===
Eddy pumping is only one component of a complex mechanism. Another important factor to take into account, especially when considering ocean-wind interaction, is the role played by eddy-induced Ekman pumping. Some other limitations of the explanation above are due to the idealised, quasi circular linear dynamical response to perturbations that neglects the vertical displacement that a particle can experience moving along a sloping neutral surface. Vertical motion in eddies is a fairly recent research topic that still presents limitations in the theory both due to complexity and lack of sufficient observations. Nonetheless, the one presented above is a simplification that helps explain partially the important role that eddies play in biological productivity, as well as their biogeochemical role in the carbon cycle.

== Biological impact ==
Recent findings suggest that mesoscale eddies are likely to play a key role in nutrient transport, such as the spatial distribution of chlorophyll concentration, in the open ocean. Lack of knowledge on the impact of eddy activity is however still notable, as eddies’ contribution has been argued not to be sufficient to maintain the observed primary production through nitrogen supply in parts of the subtropical gyre. Although the mechanisms through which eddies shape ecosystems are not yet fully understood, eddies transport nutrients through a combination of horizontal and vertical processes. Stirring and trapping relate to nutrient transport, whereas eddy pumping, eddy-induced Ekman pumping, and eddy impacts on mixed-layer depth variate nutrient. Here, the role played by eddy pumping is discussed.

Cyclonic eddy pumping drives new primary production by lifting nutrient-rich waters into the euphotic zone. Complete utilisation of the upwelled nutrients is guaranteed by two main factors. Firstly, biological uptake takes place in timescales that are much shorter than the average lifetime of eddies. Secondly, because the nutrient enhancement takes place in the eddy's interior, isolated from the surrounding waters, biomass can accumulate until upwelled nutrients are fully consumed.

=== Main examples ===
Evidence of the biological impacts of eddy pumping mechanism is present in various publications based on observations and modelling of multiple locations worldwide. Eddy-centric chlorophyll anomalies have been observed in the Gulf Stream region and off the west coast of British Columbia (Haida eddies), as well as eddy-induced enhanced biological production in the Weddell-Scotia Confluence in the Southern Ocean, in the northern Gulf of Alaska, in the South China Sea, in the Bay of Bengal, in the Arabian Sea and in the north-western Alboran Sea, to name a few. Estimations of the eddy pumping in the Sargasso Sea resulted in a flux between 0.24 and 0.5 nitrogen $\frac{mol}{m^2yr}$. These quantities have been deemed sufficient to sustain a rate of new primary production consistent with estimates for this region.

On a wider ecological scale, eddy-driven variations in productivity influence the trade-off between phytoplankton larval survival and the abundance of predators. These concepts partially explain mesoscale variations in the distribution of larval bluefin tuna, sailfish, marlin, swordfish, and other species. Distributions of adult fishes have also been associated with the presence of cyclonic eddies. Particularly, higher abundances of bluefin tuna and cetaceans in the Gulf of Mexico and blue marlin in the proximity of Hawaii are linked to cyclonic eddy activities. Such spatial patterns extend to seabirds spotted in the vicinities of eddies, including great frigate birds in the Mozambique Channel and albatross, terns, and shearwaters in the South Indian Ocean.

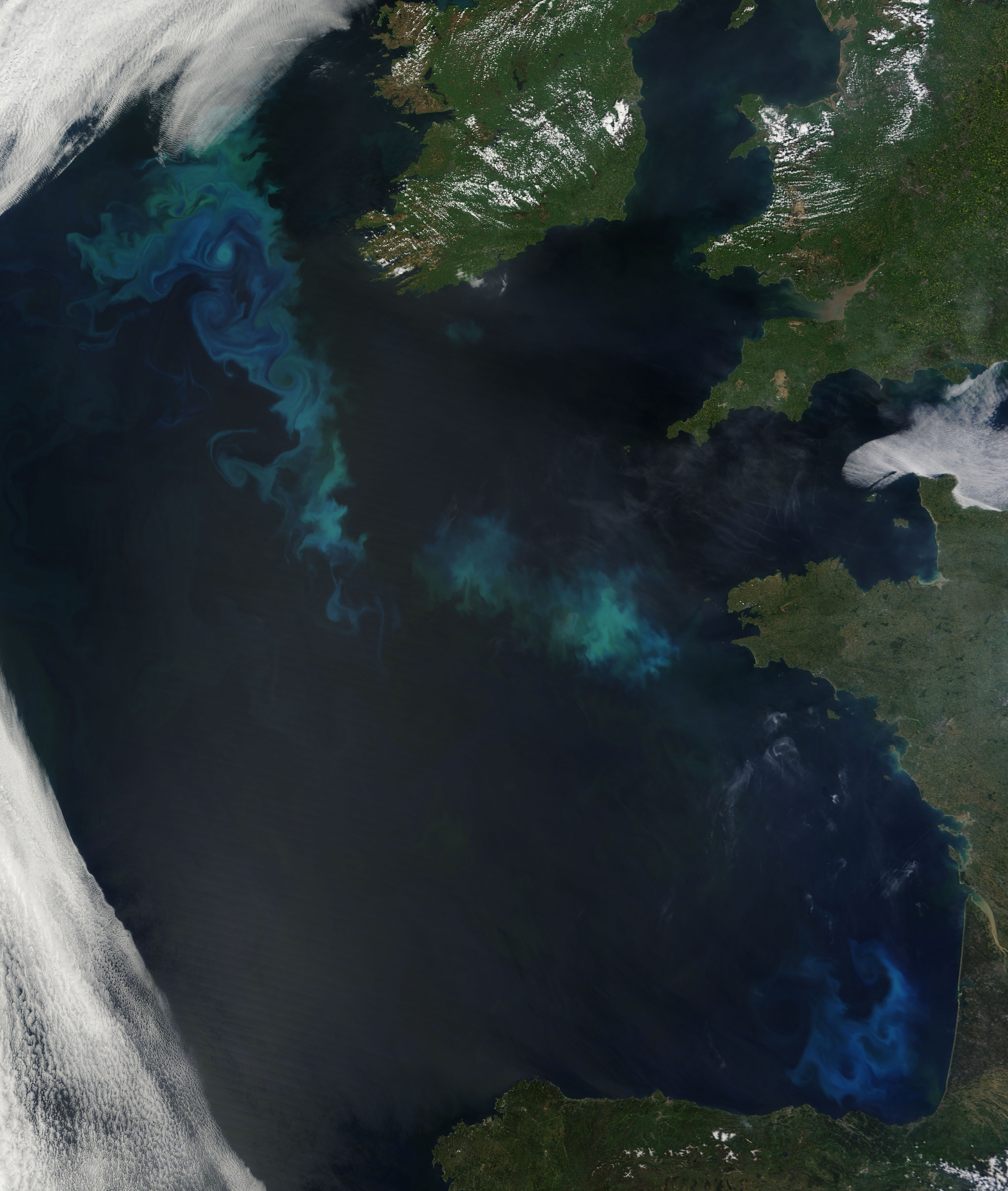
Phytoplankton Bloom in the North Atlantic due to eddy upwelling. [We acknowledge the use of imagery provided by services from NASA's Global Imagery Browse Services (GIBS), part of NASA's Earth Observing System Data and Information System (EOSDIS).]

==== North Atlantic Algal Bloom ====
The North Sea is an ideal basin for the formation of algal blooms or spring blooms due to the combination of abundant nutrients and intense Arctic winds that favour the mixing of waters. Blooms are important indicators of the health of a marine ecosystem.

Springtime phytoplankton blooms have been thought to be initiated by seasonal light increase and near-surface stratification. Recent observations from the sub-polar North Atlantic experiment and biophysical models suggest that the bloom may be instead resulting from an eddy-induced stratification, taking place 20 to 30 days earlier than it would occur by seasonal changes. These findings revolutionise the entire understanding of spring blooms. Moreover, eddy pumping and eddy-induced Ekman pumping have been shown to dominate late-bloom and post-bloom biological fields.

== Biogeochemistry ==
Phytoplankton absorbs $CO_2$ through photosynthesis. When such organisms die and sink to the seafloor, the carbon they absorbed gets stored in the deep ocean through what is known as the biological pump. Recent research has been investigating the role of eddy pumping and more in general, of vertical motion in mesoscale eddies in the carbon cycle. Evidence has shown that eddy pumping-induced upwelling and downwelling may play a significant role in shaping the way that carbon is stored in the ocean. Despite the fact that research in this field is only developing recently, first results show that eddies contribute less than 5% of the total annual export of phytoplankton to the ocean interior.

== Plastic pollution ==
Eddies play an important role in the sea surface distribution of microplastics in the ocean. Due to their convergent nature, anticyclonic eddies trap and transport microplastics at the sea surface, along with nutrients, chlorophyll and zooplankton. In the North Atlantic subtropical gyre, the first direct observation of sea surface concentrations of microplastics between a cyclonic and an anticyclonic mesoscale eddy has shown an increased accumulation in the latter. Accumulation of microplastics has environmental impacts through its interaction with the biota. Initially buoyant plastic particles (between 0.01 and 1 mm) are submerged below the climatological mixed layer depth mainly due to biofouling. In regions with very low productivity, particles remain within the upper part of the mixed layer and can only sink below it if a spring bloom occurs.

== See also ==
- Algal bloom - a rapid increase or accumulation in the population of algae in freshwater o marine water systems
- Baroclinic instability - fluid dynamical instability of fundamental importance in the atmosphere and ocean
- Ekman pumping - Ekman Pumping is the component of Ekman transport that results in areas of downwelling due to the convergence of water
- Haida Eddies - episodic, clockwise rotating ocean eddies that form during the winter off the west coast of British Columbia
- Mesoscale ocean eddies - Swirling in the ocean created by its turbulent nature
- Spring bloom – Strong increase in phytoplankton abundance that typically occurs in the early spring
