= Downwelling =

Downwards movement of one fluid within another

Schematic of coastal downwelling in the Northern Hemisphere.

Downwelling is the downward movement of a fluid parcel and its properties (e.g., salinity, temperature, pH) within a larger fluid. It is closely related to upwelling, the upward movement of fluid.

While downwelling is most commonly used to describe an oceanic process, it's also used to describe a variety of Earth phenomena. This includes mantle dynamics, air movement, and movement in freshwater systems (e.g., large lakes). This article will focus on oceanic downwelling and its important implications for ocean circulation and biogeochemical cycles. Two primary mechanisms transport water downward: buoyancy forcing and wind-driven Ekman transport (i.e., Ekman pumping).

Downwelling has important implications for marine life. Surface water generally has a lower nutrient content compared to deep water due to primary production using nutrients in the photic zone. Surface water is, however, high in oxygen compared to the deep ocean due to photosynthesis and air-sea gas exchange. When water is moved downwards, oxygen is pumped below the surface, where it’s used by decaying organisms. Downwelling events are accompanied by low primary production in the surface ocean due to a lack of nutrient supply from below.

== Mechanisms ==
=== Buoyancy ===
Buoyancy-forced downwelling, often termed convection, is the deepening of a water parcel due to a change in the density of that parcel. Density changes in the surface ocean are primarily the result of evaporation, precipitation, heating, cooling, or the introduction and mixing of an alternate water or salinity source, such as river input or brine rejection. Notably, convection is the driving force behind global thermohaline circulation. For a water parcel to move downward, the density of that parcel must increase; therefore, evaporation, cooling, and brine rejection are the processes that control buoyancy-forced downwelling.

=== Wind-driven Ekman transport ===
Ekman transport is the net mass transport of the ocean surface resulting from wind stress and the Coriolis force. As wind blows across the ocean surface, it causes a frictional force that drags the uppermost surface water along with it. Due to the Earth's rotation, these surface currents develop at 45° to the wind direction. However, compounding frictional forces cause the net transport across the Ekman layer to be 90° to the right of wind stress in the Northern Hemisphere and 90° to the left in the Southern Hemisphere. Ekman transport piles up water between the trade winds and westerlies in subtropical gyres, or near the shore during coastal downwelling. The increased mass of surface water creates high-pressure zones that push water downward. It can also create long convergence zones during sustained winds to create Langmuir circulation.

== Buoyancy-forced downwelling ==
Buoyancy is lost through cooling, evaporation, and brine rejection through sea ice formation. Buoyancy loss occurs on many spatial and temporal scales.

In the open ocean, there are regions where cooling and mixed layer deepening occur at night, and the ocean re-stratifies during the day. On annual cycles, widespread cooling begins in the fall, and convective mixed layer deepening can reach hundreds of meters into the ocean interior. In comparison, the wind-driven mixed layer depth is limited to 150 m.

Large evaporation events can cause convection; however, latent heat loss associated with evaporation is usually dominant and in the winter, this process drives Mediterranean Sea deep water formation. In select locations - Greenland Sea, Labrador Sea, Weddell Sea, and Ross Sea - deep convection (>1000 m) ventilates (oxygenates) most of the deep water of the global ocean and drives the thermohaline circulation.

== Wind-forced downwelling ==
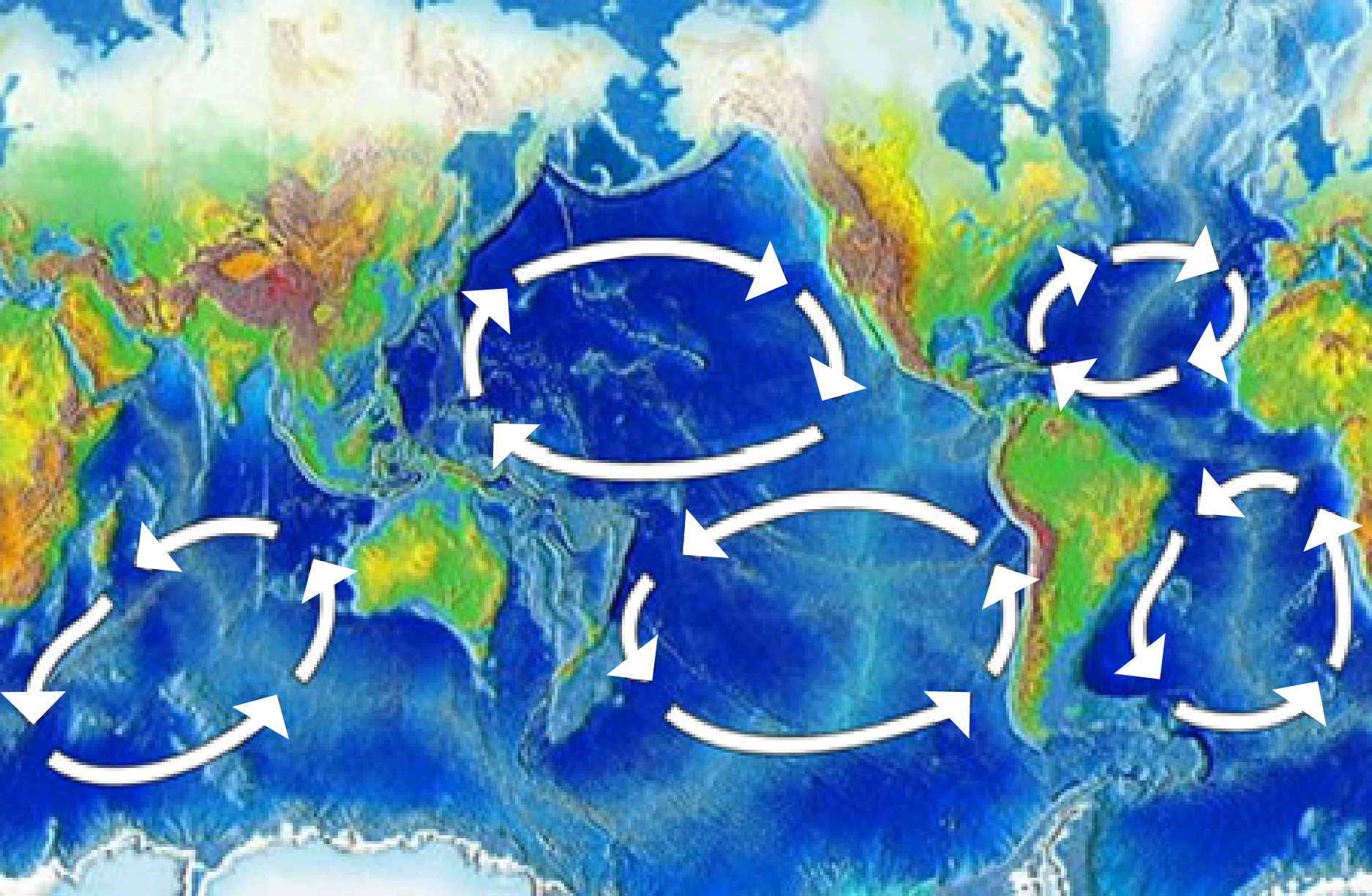
Map showing the five subtropical ocean gyres.

=== Subtropical gyres ===
Subtropical gyres act on the largest scale that we observe downwelling. Winds to the north and south of each ocean basin blow opposite each other such that Ekman transport moves water toward the basin's center. This movement piles up water, creating a high-pressure zone in the center of the gyre, low pressure on the borders, and deepens the mixed layer. The water in this zone would diffuse outward if the planet weren't spinning. However, because of the Coriolis force, the water rotates clockwise in the Northern Hemisphere and counterclockwise in the southern, creating a gyre. While it spins, the rotating high-pressure zone forces water downward, resulting in downwelling. Typical downwelling rates associated with ocean gyres are on the order of 10’s of meters per year.

=== Coastal downwelling ===
Coastal downwelling occurs when winds blow parallel to the shore. With such winds, Ekman transport directs water movement towards or directly away from the shore. If Ekman transport moves water towards the shore, the shoreline acts as a barrier causing surface water to pile up onshore. The piled-up water is forced downwards, pumping warm, nutrient-poor, oxygenated water below the mixed layer.

=== Langmuir circulation ===
Langmuir circulation develops from the wind, which, through Ekman transport, creates alternating zones of convergence and divergence at the ocean surface. In convergent zones, marked by long strips of floating debris accumulation, such as the Great Pacific Garbage Patch, coherent vortices transport surface waters to the base of the mixed layer develop. Also, direct wind stirring and current shear at the base of the mixed layer can create instabilities and turbulence that further mix properties within and at the base.

== Association with other ocean features ==
=== Eddies ===
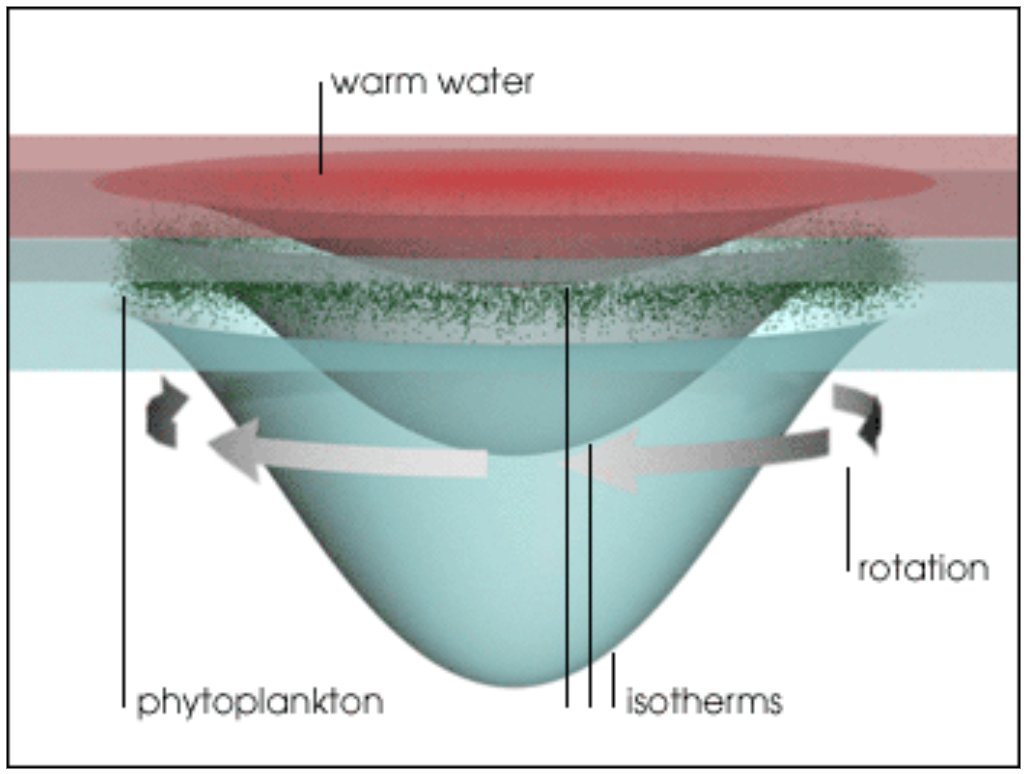
Warm-core eddy in the Northern Hemisphere. Shown are the clockwise rotation of waters, depressed isopycnals, and low productivity at the eddy's center.

Meso- (>10-100's km) and submesoscale (<1-10 km) eddies are ubiquitous features of the upper ocean. Eddies have either a cyclonic (cold-core) or anticyclonic (warm-core) rotation. Warm-core eddies are characterized by anticyclonic rotation that directs surface waters inward, creating high sea surface temperature and height. The high central hydrostatic pressure maintained by this rotation causes the downwelling of water and the depression of isopycnals - surfaces of constant density (see Eddy pumping) at scales of hundreds of meters per year. The typical result is a deeper surface layer of warm water often characterized by low primary production.

Warm-core eddies play multiple important roles in biogeochemical cycling and air-sea interactions. For example, these eddies are seen to decrease ice formation in the Southern Ocean due to their high sea surface temperatures. It has also been observed that air-sea fluxes of carbon dioxide decrease at the center of these eddies and that temperature was the leading cause of this inhibited flux. Warm-core eddies transport oxygen into the ocean interior (below the photic zone) which supports respiration. Although compounds such as oxygen are transported into the deep ocean, there is an observed decrease in carbon export in warm-core eddies due to intensified stratification at their center. Such stratification inhibits the mixing of nutrient-rich waters to the surface where they could fuel primary production. In this case, since primary production stays low, carbon export potential remains low.

=== Fronts and filaments ===
Ocean fronts are formed by the horizontal convergence of dissimilar water masses. They can develop at regions of freshwater input marked by horizontal density gradients due to salinity and temperature differences or the stretching and elongation of rotating flows.

Submesoscale fronts and filaments are formed by ocean current interactions and flow instabilities. They are regions that connect the surface layer and the ocean interior. These regions are characterized by horizontal buoyancy gradients < 10 km in scale, caused by sloping isopycnals. Two primary mechanisms transport surface waters to depth: the adiabatic tilting and relaxation of these isopycnals, and along-isopycnal flow or subduction. These mechanisms can transport surface properties, such as heat, below the mixed layer and assist in carbon sequestration through the biological pump. Numerical models predict vertical velocities at submesoscale fronts on the order of 100 m/day. However, vertical velocities over 1000 m/day have been observed using ocean floats. These observations are rare because ship-based sensors do not have sufficient accuracy to measure vertical velocities.

== Variability ==
Downwelling trends differ between latitudes and can be associated with variations in wind strength and changing seasons. In some areas, coastal downwelling is a seasonal event pushing nutrient-depleted waters towards the shore. The relaxation or reversal of upwelling-favorable winds creates periods of downwelling as waters pile up along the coast.

Temperature differences and wind patterns are seasonal in temperate latitudes, creating highly variable upwelling and downwelling conditions. For example, in fall and winter along the Pacific Northwest coast in the United States, southerly winds in the Gulf of Alaska and California Current system create downwelling-favorable conditions, transporting offshore water from the south and west towards the coast. These downwelling events tend to last for days and can be associated with winter storms and contribute to low levels of primary production observed during fall and winter. In contrast, during the "spring transition" at the end of the downwelling season and the beginning of the upwelling season is marked by the presence of cold, nutrient-rich, upwelled water at the coast, which stimulates high levels of primary production. In contrast to seasonally variable temperate regions, downwelling is relatively steady at the poles as cold air decreases the temperature of salty water transported by gyres from the tropics.

During the neutral and La Niña phases of the El Niño Southern Oscillation (ENSO), steady easterly trade winds in equatorial regions can cause water to pile up in the western Pacific. A weakening of these trade winds can create downwelling Kelvin waves, which propagate along the equator in the eastern Pacific. Series of Kelvin waves associated with anomalously warm sea surface temperatures in the eastern Pacific can be a predecessor to an El Niño event. During the El Niño phase of ENSO, the disruption of trade winds causes ocean water to pile up off the western coast of South America. This shift is associated with a decrease in upwelling and may enhance coastal downwelling.

== Effects on ocean biogeochemistry ==
Biogeochemical cycling related to downwelling is constrained by the location and frequency at which this process occurs. The majority of downwelling, as described above, occurs in polar regions as deep and bottom water formation or in the center of subtropical gyres. Bottom and deep water formation in the Southern Ocean (Weddell Sea) and North Atlantic Ocean (Greenland, Labrador, Norwegian, and Mediterranean Seas) is a major contributor towards the removal and sequestration of anthropogenic carbon dioxide, dissolved organic carbon (DOC), and dissolved oxygen. Dissolved gas solubility is greater in cold water allowing for increased gas concentrations.

The Southern Ocean alone has been shown to be the most important high-latitude region controlling pre-industrial atmospheric carbon dioxide by general circulation model simulations. Circulation of water into the Antarctic deep-water formation region is one of the main factors drawing carbon dioxide into the surface oceans. The other is the biological pump, which is typically limited by iron in the Southern Ocean in areas with high nutrients and low chlorophyll (HNLC). DOC can become entrained during bottom and deep water formation which is a large portion of biogenic carbon export. It is thought that the export of DOC is up to 30% of the biogenic carbon that makes it into the deep ocean. The intensity of the DOC flux to depth relies on the strength of winter convection, which also affects the microbial food web, causing variations in the DOC exported to depth. Dissolved oxygen is also downwelled at bottom and deep water formation sites, contributing to elevated dissolved oxygen concentrations below 1000 meters.

Subtropical gyres are typically limited in macro and micro nutrients such as nitrogen, phosphorus, and iron; resulting in picophytoplankton communities that have low nutrient requirements. This is in part due to consistent downwelling, which transports nutrients away from the photic zone. These oligotrophic areas are thought to be sustained by rapid nutrient cycling which could leave little carbon remaining that could be sequestered. The dynamics of picophytoplankton's role in carbon cycling in subtropical gyres is poorly understood and is being actively researched.

Areas with the highest primary productivity play significant roles in biogeochemical cycling of carbon and nitrogen. Downwelling can either alleviate or induce anoxic conditions, depending on the initial conditions and location. Sustained periods of upwelling can cause deoxygenation which is relieved by a downwelling event transporting dissolved oxygen back down to depths. Anoxic conditions can also result from persistent downwelling after an algal bloom of high-biomass dinoflagellates. The accumulation of dinoflagellates and other forms of biomass nearshore due to downwelling will eventually cause nutrient depletion and mortality of organisms. As the biomass decays, oxygen becomes depleted by heterotrophic bacteria, inducing anoxic conditions.
