= Irminger Rings =

Ocean eddies in Labrador Sea which influence deep convection

Irminger Rings (IRs) are mesoscale (15-50 kilometers) ocean eddies that are formed off the West coast of Greenland and travel southwestwards through the Labrador Sea. Most IRs are anti-cyclonic (clockwise in the Northern Hemisphere). There is considerable interest in researching IRs, because they have been hypothesized to influence deep convection in the Labrador sea, and therefore the formation of deep water.

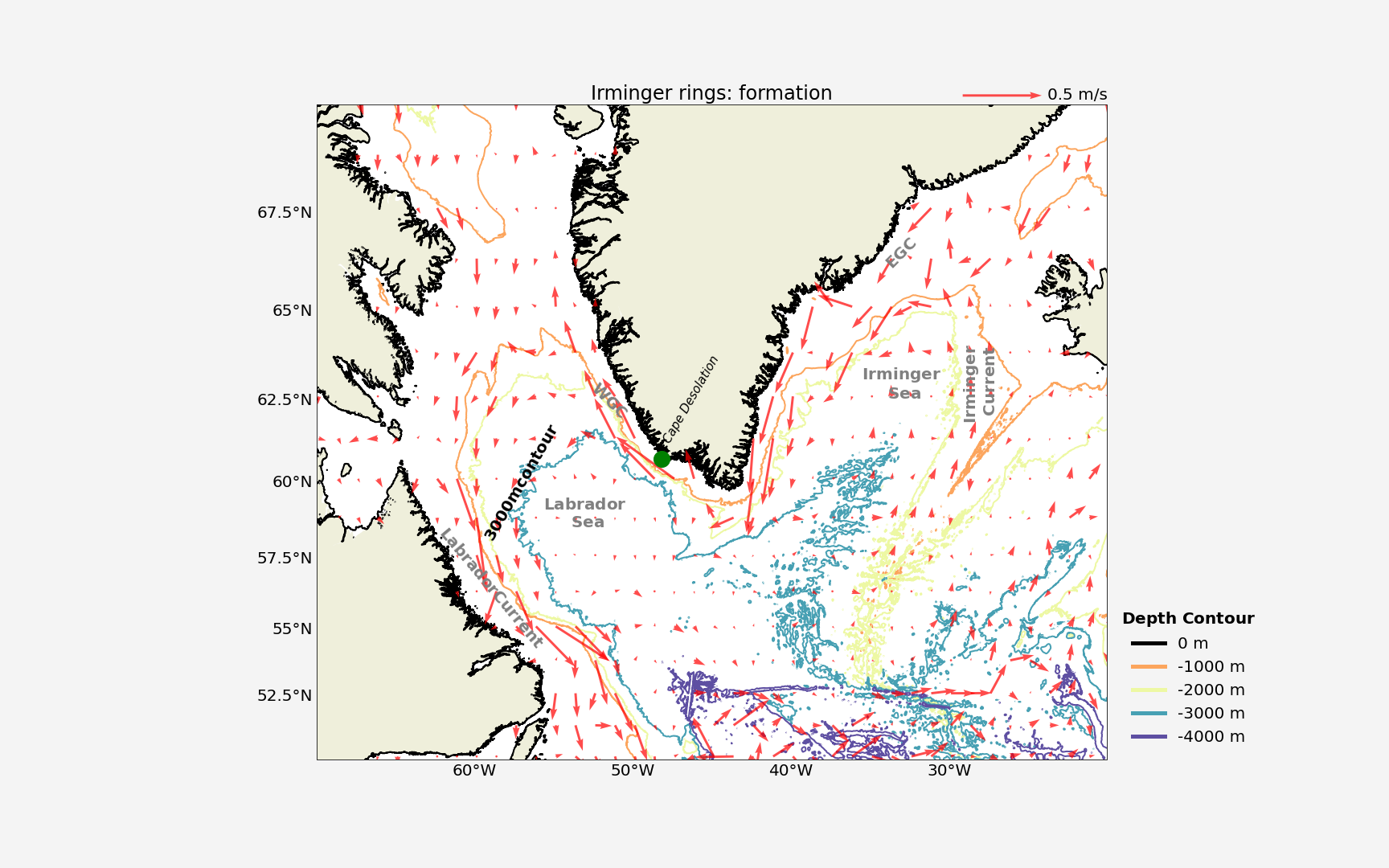
Map showing the mean velocity for 2020 and 2021 and depth contours of the Irminger and Labrador seas. Cape desolation marks the location where most irminger rings are formed. The 3000m depth contour is the contour Irminger rings tend to follow when they propagate. The bathymetry data is obtained from the General Bathymetric Chart of the Ocean (GEBCO). The current data is obtained from the CMEMs database.

== Basin overview ==
The Irminger Current (IC) is a branch of the North Atlantic Drift (NAD) that flows westward from Iceland. Because of its Atlantic origins, IC waters are relatively warm and saline compared to the cold, fresh water of the East Greenland Current (EGC) originating from the Greenland Sea. Off the East coast of Greenland, the IC and the EGC meet and "combine" after rounding Cape Farewell to form the heavily stratified current system known as the West Greenland Current (WGC). The top layer of the WGC is 200 meters deep and consists of fresh EGC water. The layer below, from 200 to 700 meters, consists of salty Irminger Water (IW).

== Irminger Ring formation ==
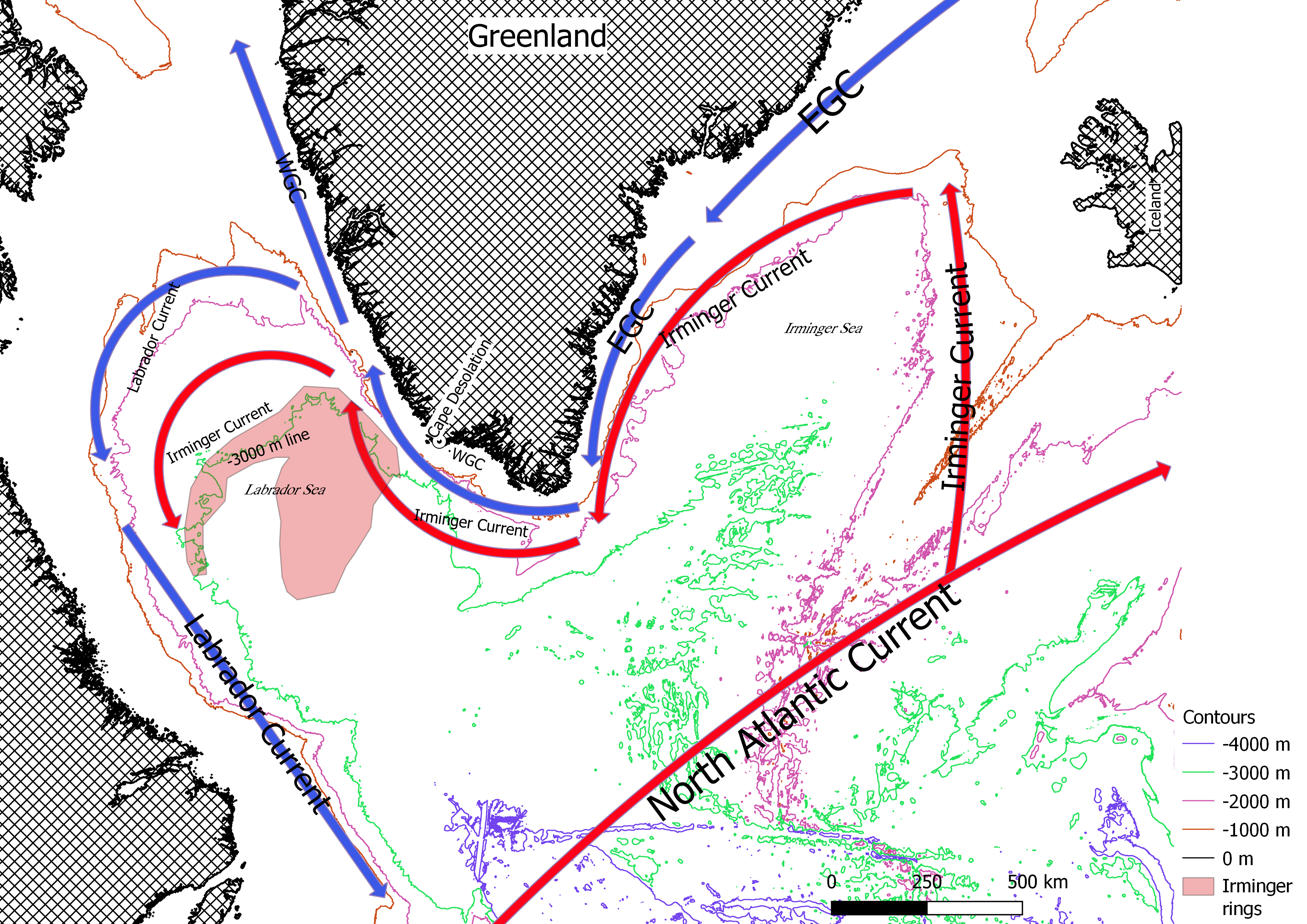
Qualitative map of the currents in the Labrador sea. The red area marks an area with relatively high eddy kinetic energy.

The topography of the Greenland coast steepens rapidly between 60° and 62°N, near Cape Desolation. This steep slope can induce instabilities in the WGC, leading to the formation of Irminger rings. It is unclear whether these instabilities are mainly barotropic or baroclinic, with contradicting outcomes between models.

Barotropic instabilities can be created by a large horizontal shear in the current. The sudden change in topography causes the geostrophic contours of the flow to converge, which increases the vertical extent and a decreases the width of the WGC. The resulting horizontal shears are sufficient to create barotropic instability.

Baroclinic instability is induced by the large horizontal density gradient in the WGC near the bottom. The misalignment of surfaces of equal pressure and density induces a vertical velocity gradient. The energy of the baroclinic instability is proportional to the potential energy of the environmental flow related to the vertical shear of the current.

Both barotropic and baroclinic instabilities generate vorticity leading to eddies called Irminger Rings. Associated with the formation of IRs is an increase in Eddy Kinetic Energy (EKE). IRs are not the only type of eddy spawned around the Labrador Sea. Convective events in the interior Labrador sea create steep density gradients. The associated baroclinic instability gives rise to Convective Eddies (CEs) (20-30 kilometers in diameter) that are more vertically homogeneous. In addition, weak instabilities in the WGC and LC along the West Greenland and Labrador coast spawn Boundary Current Eddies (BCEs).

=== Irminger Ring characteristics ===
Irminger Rings are mostly anticyclonic eddies with surface-intensified currents ranging from 30 to 80 cm/s in magnitude. The Rossby number of IRs is between 0.1 and 0.5. Since IRs are shed off the WGC, their vertical structure is similar to the WGC. The upper layer of IRs consists of freshwater, originating from the EGC. Below the upper layer is the relatively warm and saline IW. IRs are also regularly found to have secondary cores at depths between 1–1.5 km related to an enhanced downward isopycnal depression. Due to the contribution of IW, IRs are less dense and therefore more buoyant than typical water at the same depth. Both the freshwater and IW layer have a steep vertical density gradient, which results in strongly stratified IRs. The freshwater layer is found to be the largest contributor to Irminger ring stratification. Over the lifetime of IRs, the stratification decreases as the upper layer becomes saltier and the lower layer becomes fresher. During winter, the freshwater layer often erodes, which also drastically reduces the stratification.

==== Propagation ====
The main mode of propagation of IRs is in southwestward direction with an approximate speed of 5 cm/s. Modelled IRs roughly follow the 3000 meter depth isobath. IRs have a typical lifetime of a few months. Models find that IRs are prone to decay during winters with large convection events, but some survive up to 2 years. IRs that spawn in the south are likely to live long enough to reach the deep basin of the Labrador Sea, while IRs spawned further north are more likely to be disrupted by Boundary Currents (BCs).

==== Temporal variability ====
IR production increases during winter, due to the EKE maximum associated with higher WGC velocities. During fall the core of IRs has been measured to be warmer (1.9 °C) and saltier (0.07 psu saltier) than in spring. This is theorized to be a response to the seasonal cycle of IW, which reaches the highest current velocities in fall.

On interannual timescales, the Arctic Oscillation influences the formation of IRs. If the Arctic Oscillation is its positive phase, this leads to stronger currents in the WGC and other boundary currents. The larger WGC current increases the available EKE for IR generation.

== Influence on Labrador Sea deep convection ==
The Labrador Sea is one of the few places in the ocean where deep convection occurs. Due to the cyclonic large scale flow and high latitude positioning, the stratification in the Labrador Sea is usually weak. Deep convection events can occur during winter, if the cooling in the top layer is large enough to create a higher density in the top layer than the water below. As a consequence of this unstable stratification, large scale vertical mixing can be induced, which creates a deep mixed layer. The homogeneous water mass that is formed during deep convection is called Labrador Sea Water (LSW). LSW is a source of North Atlantic Deep Water, which is essential for the Atlantic Meridional Overturning Circulation. Deep convection also allows for mixing of oxygen and carbon dioxide into the deep ocean. Variations in the magnitude of deep convection are large, and can be up to 2000 meter depth. After a convective event, the Labrador Sea gradually restratifies during spring. The extent of this restratification influences the variability of future convective events.

=== Suppression of deep convection ===
Due to the long lifetime of Irminger rings, some reach the convective area in the interior Labrador Sea. Since IRs are highly stratified and buoyant, they enhance the stratification of the Labrador Sea. Consequently, Irminger Rings suppress deep convection in the Labrador Sea, which decreases Labrador Sea Water production. Specifically, IRs limit the area of deep convection in the North. Although IRs are more abundant during the positive phase of the Arctic Oscillation, this doesn't lead to reduced deep convection since the positive Arctic Oscillation phase simultaneously enhances deep convection.

=== Restratification ===
In addition to suppressing deep convection, IRs enhance restratification after convective events. The extent of IR-induced restratification is not clear. Possibly, IRs contribute to restratification only rarely and not on an annual basis. Convective Eddies (CEs) and Boundary Current Eddies (BCEs) also enhance restratification in the Labrador Sea. The relative contribution of IRs, CEs and BCEs to restratification is disputed. Some modelling studies find that IRs resupply more heat after a convective event than CEs and BCEs, while others find that CEs or BCEs are the main contributor. This variation can be explained partly by inter-model differences in position of the convective area in the Labrador Sea.

== Influence of Labrador Sea deep convection on Irminger Rings ==
Some interannual variability of IRs is related to the intensity of convective events, as more intense deep convection produces higher density Labrador Sea Water. This in turn causes a greater density gradient between the sea and the buoyant West Greenland Current, which positively correlates with eddy fluxes.

Although Irminger Rings decrease the production of LSW by suppressing deep convection, LSW can also be produced by IRs. During deep convection events, vertical mixing can take place inside long lived IRs that have reached the convective area. The typical extent of IR convective vertical mixing is between 100 and 700 meters deep, but can be up to 1300 meter during large convective events. This is almost as deep as in the rest of the convective area. In an ocean model, LSW was produced during this mixing by Irminger Rings that lived over 2 years.
