= Haida Eddies =

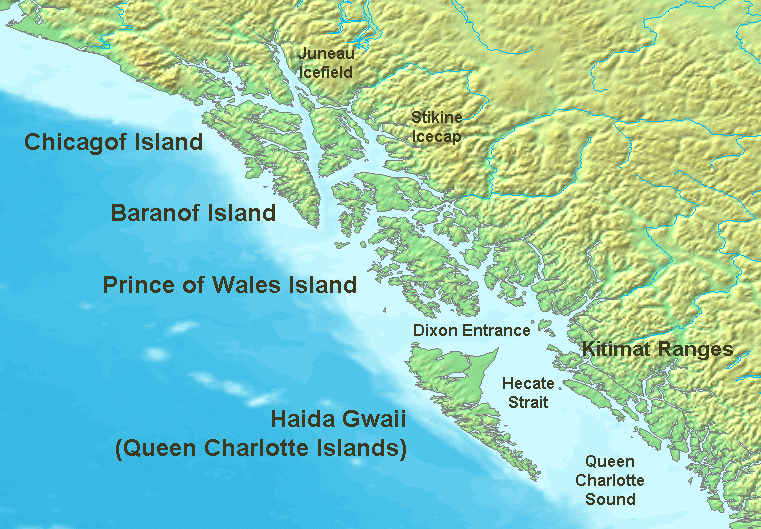
Northwest coast of British Columbia, and southeast Alaska.

Haida Eddies are episodic, clockwise rotating ocean eddies that form during the winter off the west coast of British Columbia's Haida Gwaii and Alaska's Alexander Archipelago. These eddies are notable for their large size, persistence, and frequent recurrence. Rivers flowing off the North American continent supply the continental shelf in the Hecate Strait with warmer, fresher, and nutrient-enriched water. Haida eddies are formed every winter when this rapid outflow of water through the strait wraps around Cape St. James at the southern tip of Haida Gwaii, and meets with the cooler waters of the Alaska Current. This forms a series of plumes which can merge into large eddies that are shed into the northeast Pacific Ocean by late winter, and may persist for up to two years.

Haida eddies can be more than 250 km in diameter, and transport a mass of coastal water approximately the volume of Lake Michigan over 1,000 km offshore into the lower nutrient waters of the northeast Pacific Ocean. These "warm-core rings" transport heat out to sea, supplying nutrients (particularly nitrate and iron) to nutrient depleted areas of lower productivity. Consequently, primary production in Haida eddies is up to three times higher than in ambient waters, supporting vast phytoplankton-based communities, as well as influencing zooplankton and icthyoplankton community compositions.

The Haida name is derived from the Haida people native to the region, centered on the islands of Haida Gwaii (formerly known as the Queen Charlotte Islands).

== Historical observations ==
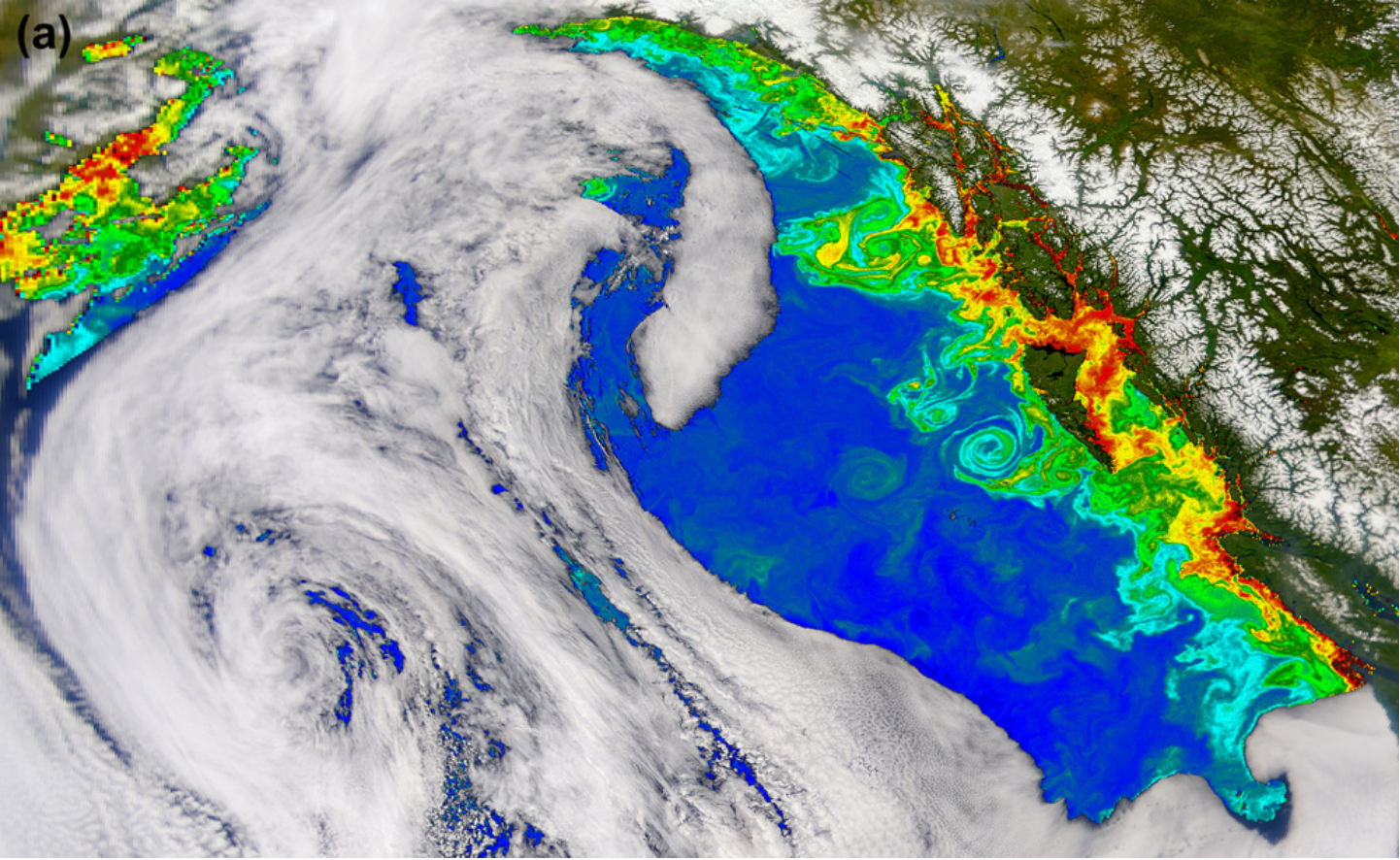
NASA Visible Earth image; ocean color from the SeaWIFS satellite, showing an anticyclonic Haida eddy in the Alaskan Current, southwest of Haida Gwaii.

Due to their large size, it was not until the satellite era that scientists were able to observe the full scale and life cycles of Haida eddies. Their extent is such that an ocean liner can move through the eddy without observing its borders, so accurate records did not exist until the late 1980s.

Between 1985 and 1990, the first US research mission to study changes in sea surface height using radar altimetry (an instrument used to measure the ocean surface height using a radar pulse in reference to a geoid), was conducted by the US Navy using the Geodetic/Geophysical Satellite (GEOSAT). The primary focus was to study fronts, eddies, winds, waves, and tides; each of these processes produce a change in sea surface height of several meters. In 1986, researchers Gower and Tabata observed clockwise eddies in the Gulf of Alaska using GEOSAT - the first satellite observation of Haida eddies. In 1987, the Ocean Storms program deployed 50 drifters to examine intertidal oscillations and mixing during fall storms and observed eddies propagating westward. Also in 1987, researchers Richard Thomson, Paul LeBlond, and William Emery observed that ocean drifters deployed in the Gulf of Alaska at 100–120 meters below the surface had stopped their eastward motion and actually began to move westward counter to the predominant current. The researchers attributed the unexpected motion to eddies dragging the buoys westward from their path at approximately 1.5 cm/s.

In 1992, Haida eddies were observed by researchers Meyers and Basu as positive sea surface height anomalies using TOPEX-POSEIDON, an altimetry-based satellite platform (like GEOSAT). They specifically noted an increase in the number of Haida eddies during the 1997/1998 El Niño winter. Haida eddy altimetry observations were further supplemented by European Remote Sensing satellites, ERS1 and ERS2. In 1995 Richard Thomson, together with James Gower at the Institute of Ocean Sciences in British Columbia, discovered the first clear evidence of eddies along the entire continental margin using temperature maps from infrared observations using National Oceanic and Atmospheric Administration (NOAA) satellites. Satellite observations coupled with drifter observations have allowed scientists to resolve physical and biogeochemical structures of Haida eddies.

== Formation ==
=== General circulation ===
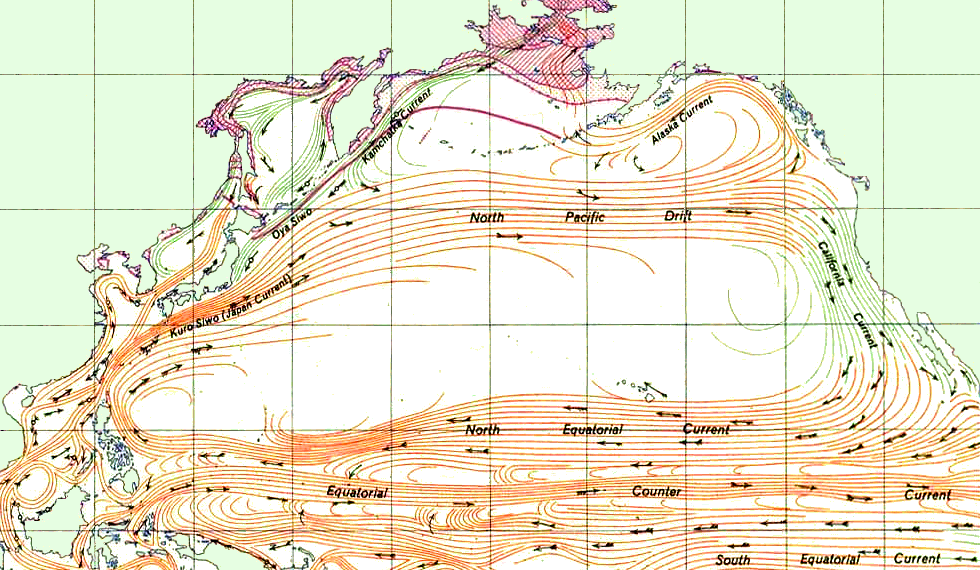
North Pacific Current splitting into southward California Current and northward Alaska Current (bifurcation in image occurring around 45°N). Haida eddies occur within the subpolar Alaska Gyre to the north of the Pacific Current. Arrows indicate the direction of the current.

Ocean circulation in the region begins with the transport of waters eastward along the North Pacific Current, also known as the "West Wind Drift", which forms the northern branch of the anticyclonic (clockwise rotation of fluids in Northern Hemisphere) North Pacific subtropical gyre. The North Pacific current approaches the continental US and bifurcates into the southward flowing California Current and the northward flowing Alaska Current. The latitude of this bifurcation is dependent on changes in the midlatitude (30-60° latitude) westerly atmospheric wind patterns, which is the primary forcing on the ocean's circulation in this region. These westerly winds oscillate around 45°N and can have variable wind speeds. Changes in these winds are based on the large-scale atmospheric circulation which has seasonal (summer/winter), interannual (ENSO), and decadal (Pacific Decadal Oscillation, or PDO) variability. The northwestward Alaska Current then feeds into the westward Alaskan Coastal Current, and eventually into the Alaskan Stream; together these make up the cyclonic (counterclockwise rotating) subpolar Alaskan gyre, where Haida eddies are found.

In winter, the location of the North Pacific Current bifurcation is approximately 45°N, which is 5° south of where it bifurcates in the summer at approximately 50°N. This has implications as to what water is moved into the Alaskan subpolar gyre. In winter, when the splitting of the current is more south, fresh, warmer waters from river input from the Columbia (47°N) and Fraser (49°N) rivers are transported north. This shift in the North Pacific current location leads to winter currents transporting relatively warmer water poleward from a lower latitude than in the summer. Although the northern branch of the subtropical gyre shifts south in the winter, the subpolar gyre does not shift location, but intensifies in its circulation. This intensification brings a greater volume of water from the south into the subpolar gyre, which again is dependent on the magnitude of atmospheric circulation. For example: the Aleutian Low is a persistent low pressure system over the Gulf of Alaska that can fluctuate on decadal timescales, producing the PDO. If this system is relatively strong during winter, there will be an increase in northward transport of waters along the Alaskan current from southerly winds. Haida eddies have been documented to form predominantly in the winter when bifurcation is south, and favorable atmospheric conditions are met to intensify the subpolar gyre. With these conditions, Haida eddy formation has also been documented to occur from baroclinic instabilities from alongshore wind reversals, equatorial Kelvin waves, and bottom topography. Baroclinic instabilities form when tilting or sloping of isopycnals (horizontal lines of constant density) form. Baroclinic instabilities from alongshore wind reversals occur when a persistent wind along the coast changes direction. For example: in the Gulf of Alaska average winds travel from the south, poleward (termed southerly winds), but during a wind reversal the winds will abruptly shift to a northwesterly wind (coming from the northwest), and the coastal current that was being pushed north will now be pushed south. This change in direction causes rotation in an originally northward flowing current, which results in tilting isopyncals. Kelvin waves that form along the equator are able to travel along the west coast of North America to the Gulf of Alaska, where their presence can cause disruptions in the poleward current and form baroclinic instabilities. Bottom topography, the third formation process of Haida eddies, can occur because the Alaska current will interact with hills or rock formations below the surface, and this can cause baroclinic instabilities.

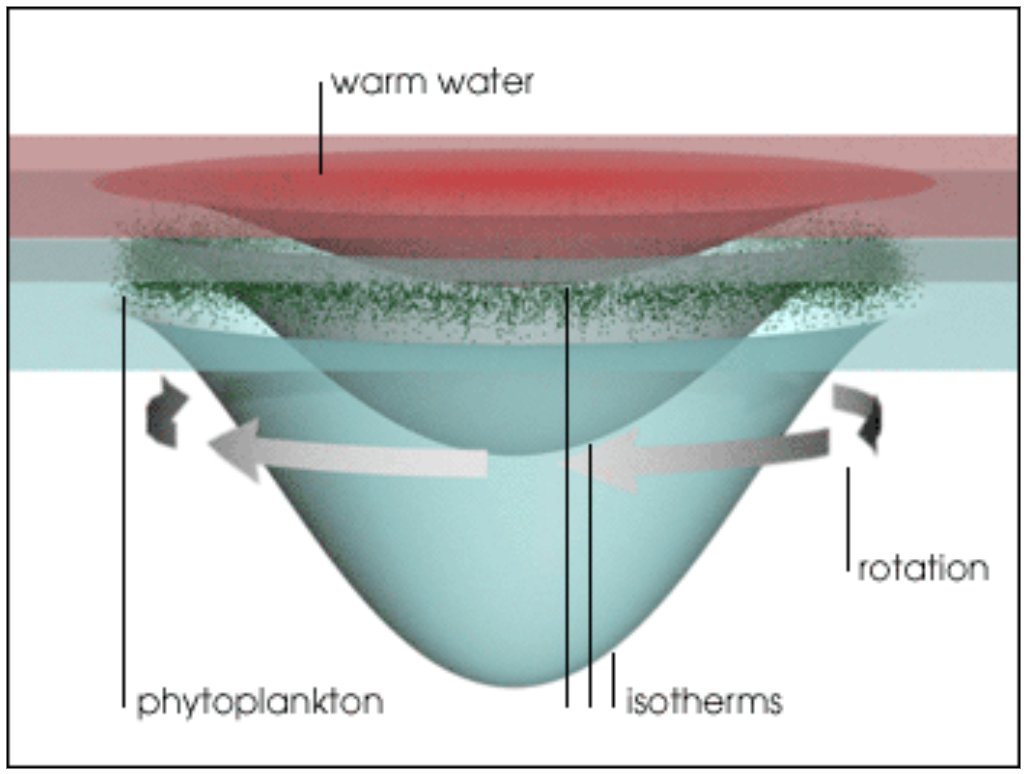
An idealized eddy in the Gulf of Alaska. "Isotherms" are lines connecting points of equal temperature. Warm, nutrient-rich coastal water spirals clockwise, forming the core of the eddy. Phytoplankton are concentrated in the edges of the eddy near the ocean surface, nourished by the nutrient-rich eddy water.

=== General physical attributes ===
Haida eddies possess common physical characteristics that are dependent on the attributes of the water that is being transported, and how that influences the overall structure. Haida eddies are characterized as relatively long-lived, transient (departure from the average ocean current along the coast), medium-sized (mesoscale) ocean eddies that rotate clockwise (anti-cyclonic), and possess a warm, less-saline core, relative to the surrounding waters. These warm waters within the eddy are attributed to the baroclinic clockwise motion that results in a piling up of water near the center, and a downward displacement of surface water to depth (downwelling). This phenomenon is referred to as Ekman pumping, resulting from a conservation of mass, vertical velocity, and the Coriolis force. Downwelling of water from convergence produces what is called 'dynamic height anomalies' between the center and the surrounding waters. The anomaly is calculated by taking the difference between the surface of interest, for example the middle of a Haida eddy, and a reference point (in oceanography it is in reference to the geopotential surface, or the geoid). Haida eddies are capable of producing dynamic height anomalies between the center and the surrounding waters of 0.12-0.35 m.

Ekman pumping of surface waters, coupled with northward transport of warm waters (from location of bifurcation), dampens the temperature gradient from the surface down to 300 m, so that water temperature within the eddy is warmer below the surface than typical conditions. Stratification increases between these warmer, less-saline vortices and the surrounding waters by effectively depressing background lines of constant temperature (isotherms) and salinity (isohalines) (shown in figure). This makes them an ideal vehicle to transport coastal water properties into the Gulf of Alaska because of reduced mixing with surrounding waters.

As Haida eddies break away from the coast into the subpolar gyre, they transport water properties such as temperature, salinity and kinetic energy. A common water mass in the area is the Pacific Subarctic Upper Water (PSUW) mass with conservative (constant through time and space) properties of salinity (32.6-33.6 psu) and temperature (3-15 °C). PSUW moves into the Alaska Current from the North Pacific Current and may be mixed via Haida eddies into the subpolar gyre. Fresh (low salinity) water from rivers are mixed into Haida eddies. They are also able to exchange potential energy and momentum from the coastal mean current, a process that takes energy away from the coastal current and advects it toward the middle of the gyre. On average, the Gulf of Alaska experiences 5.5 Haida eddies per year, with a typical eddy characterized by a dynamical height of approximately 0.179 m, propagation speed of 2 km per day, average core diameter of 97 km, total volume of approximately 3,000 to 6,000 km^{3}, and a duration of 30 weeks.

== Biogeochemical and nutrient dynamics ==
Biogeochemical dynamics in Haida eddies are typically characterized by highly productive, yet relatively nutrient depleted surface waters, that may be replenished by diffusion and mixing from nutrient abundant sub-surface core waters. This nutrient exchange is also often facilitated by seasonal fluctuations in the surface mixed layer depth (~20 m in winter, up to 100 m in summer), bringing the low-nutrient surface waters in contact with the nutrient-rich core waters as the mixed layer deepens. Upon eddy formation in winter, surface water concentrations are high in nutrients including nitrate, carbon, iron, and others that are important for biological production. However, they are quickly consumed by phytoplankton through spring and summer, until fall when the now reduced nutrient concentrations can be slowly replenished by mixing with the sub-surface core waters. The net effect of Haida eddies on macronutrients and trace metal micronutrients is that of offshore transport of materials from coastal waters to open ocean, increasing offshore primary productivity inside the eddy formation site.

=== Dissolved iron ===
The southeast and central Gulf of Alaska tends to be iron-limited, and Haida eddies deliver large quantities of iron-rich coastal waters into these regions. In High-Nutrient, Low-Chlorophyll (HNLC) areas, iron tends to limit phytoplankton growth more than macronutrients, so the delivery of iron plays an important role in stimulating biological activity. While surface waters within the eddy are similar to that of ambient HNLC waters, waters in the eddy core are highly iron-enriched. Iron is delivered upward to the surface from the eddy core as a result of physical transport properties as the eddy decays or interacts with other eddies. This iron flux into the photic zone (where light is abundant to support growth), is associated with an increase in spring and summer primary production, and drawdown of macronutrients as they are consumed by phytoplankton. Increased iron concentrations have been observed to persist in the core of the eddy up to 16 months after eddy formation. Physical transport properties retain a supply of iron to the surface from the still iron-rich eddy core for the lifetime of the eddy. Because of the large vertical iron transport, Haida eddies contribute a significant portion of the total iron available for biological use.

Total dissolved iron concentrations in Haida eddies are approximately 28 times higher than open ocean waters of the Alaska gyre. The daily average supply of iron upwelled from the eddy core is 39 times higher than the iron introduced by average daily dust deposition in the northeast Pacific. Despite the fact that seasonal shallowing and strengthening of the thermocline may inhibit mixing between the surface layer and enriched waters below (reducing iron exchange between the two by as much as 73%), concentrations are still an order of magnitude higher than ambient waters, delivering an estimated 4.6 million moles of iron annually to the Gulf of Alaska. This loading is comparable to the total iron delivery from atmospheric dust or major volcanic eruptions. Thus, the arrival of Haida eddies may introduce anywhere from 5–50% of the annual dissolved iron supply in the upper 1,000 m of the Gulf of Alaska.

In the summer of 2012, an iron fertilization experiment deposited 100 tons of finely-ground iron oxides into a Haida eddy in an effort to increase salmon returns through an attempt to increase primary production. This resulted in the highest chlorophyll concentrations measured within an eddy, and the most intense phytoplankton bloom in the last ten years in the northeast Pacific. However, the impact of this bloom on higher trophic organisms such as zooplankton and fish is not known.

=== Carbon ===
Concentrations of dissolved inorganic carbon (DIC) and nitrate (NO_{3}^{−}), which are important macronutrients for photosynthesis, are quickly depleted in Haida eddy surface waters through most of their first year due to uptake by biological primary production. This uptake of nutrients, which is largely carried out by phytoplankton, leads to observable increases in chlorophyll-a (Chl-a) concentrations. In summer, a large portion of the DIC pool is consumed due to increased production of coccolithophores, which are phytoplankton that use bicarbonate ion to build their calcium carbonate (CaCO_{3}) shells, releasing carbon dioxide (CO_{2}) in the process. This process also leads to a summertime reduction in total alkalinity, which is a measure of the capacity of seawater to neutralize acids, and is largely determined by bicarbonate and carbonate ion concentrations. Surrounding surface waters show similar, or even slightly higher concentrations of DIC, total alkalinity, and nitrates, and may at times exchange surface waters with Haida eddies, as witnessed when Haida-2000 merged with Haida-2001. Although some nutrient exchange takes place at the surface, export of organic carbon out of the eddy is not enhanced, and there is little change in organic carbon concentrations at depth, suggesting that the organic carbon formed through primary production is largely being recycled within the eddies.

In February, surface concentrations of CO_{2} (as quantified by ƒCO_{2}), in the eddy center and edges start out relatively oversaturated relative to atmospheric CO_{2} concentrations, but quickly drop, partially due to biological production. By June, ƒCO_{2} becomes undersaturated relative to atmospheric concentrations, but increases slightly again through summer, aided by warming temperatures. In the eddy center, ƒCO_{2} usually reaches near equilibrium with the atmosphere by fall (depending on timing of the mixed layer deepening), when vertical entrainment and mixing from below can replenish ƒCO_{2}, as well as the now-depleted DIC and nitrate concentrations. Lower ƒCO_{2} tends to persist through summer in edge waters however, most likely due to the presence of enhanced biological production, as suggested by the presence of higher Chl-a concentrations. Ambient waters typically reach parity with atmospheric CO_{2} by spring, after a smaller initial decrease early in the year. Net atmospheric CO_{2} removal by Haida eddies is estimated to be 0.8-1.2 million tons per year, underscoring the important role they play in the Gulf of Alaska.

=== Other trace metals ===
Transport and delivery of other trace metals in the Gulf of Alaska are also enhanced by Haida eddies and may result in increased burial of trace metals in marine sediments where they can no longer be used to support biological growth. Evidence suggests Haida eddies may be an important source of dissolved silver ions, with eddy surface water concentrations three to four times higher compared to ambient waters. Silicate uptake rates by marine diatoms in Haida eddies are three times that observed in ambient waters, suggesting strong diatom population growth. Haida eddies are important sources of silver for diatom production, as silver is incorporated into the silicate shells of diatoms and the transport of silver associated with Haida eddies promotes diatom growth. Silver is sequestered by this production and eventually transported to depth by sinking particles of organic matter, linking silver to the marine silicate cycle.

Large quantities of dissolved aluminum and manganese ions are also supplied to the Gulf of Alaska via eddy transport of coastal waters enriched from riverine inputs. The quantity transported is also comparable to that deposited by atmospheric dust. This supply of trace metals impacts the rate of dissolved iron removal because the particles tend to aggregate together and sink to the seafloor, a process which may account for 50-60% of dissolved aluminum and manganese removal. Additionally, there is evidence for enhanced delivery of cadmium and copper to the Gulf of Alaska by Haida eddies.

=== Macronutrients ===
Haida eddies can produce low silicate and high nitrate, chlorophyll, and sedimentation events offshore.

Eddies that form nearshore in the Gulf of Alaska carry shelf nutrients west into the High-Nutrient, Low-Chlorophyll (HNLC) and oligotrophic (low-nutrient) waters of the northeast Pacific, or south into seasonally nitrate-depleted waters. If eddies head southward from the Gulf of Alaska toward British Columbia, waters in the eddy become enriched in nutrients at the expense of the seawater they are capturing nutrients from, leaving coastal waters relatively nutrient poor. If eddies head west into the HNLC waters of the central Gulf of Alaska basin, they transport particulate matter and supply the photic zone with nitrate that is up to three times greater than typical seasonal transport, increasing spring productivity.

The timing of advection from the eddy has important seasonal implications on the delivery of nutrients. The high-nutrient and high-iron coastal water is carried into the Gulf of Alaska from either the core of the eddy or the outer ring. The core of the eddy contains warm, fresh, nutrient-rich waters formed in winter, and with the addition of sunlight, produces strong spring blooms of primary productivity offshore. As the eddy drifts westward in late spring and summer, the outer ring mixes coastal and deep ocean waters in large arcs around the eddy edge. This process has an effect hundreds of kilometers offshore, and facilitates the exchange of nutrients between shelf to deep ocean from late winter to the following autumn.

=== Biology ===
Nutrients trapped and transported by Haida eddies support more biological growth compared to surrounding, low-nutrient ocean water.

Elevated measurements of chlorophyll in eddy centers, as compared to surrounding water, indicate that eddies increase primary production, and can support multiple phytoplankton blooms within a single year. These blooms are not only caused by increased nutrients, but also the eddy's ability to transport biota from the coast into the eddy. Spring blooms are caused by sufficient light reaching the warm, nutrient-rich water contained in the middle of the eddy, due to anticyclonic rotation. A second bloom can occur once the eddy has moved closer to the deep ocean, when the outer reaches of the eddy can gather nutrient-rich water from either the coast or from an adjacent eddy. Coastal water transported by this outer ring advection can move from the coast into the eddy in six days which also allows for the rapid transport of coastal algae into the nutrient-rich eddy waters. A late summer bloom can occur if storms produce vertical convection of the mixed layer, causing it to deepen and trap nutrients from below into the region of primary production.

High eddy kinetic energy (EKE) may also increase chlorophyll concentration in eddies. Northern Gulf of Alaska and Haida eddy regions have more chlorophyll when EKE was higher, which can be caused by storms, producing higher mixing of the mixed layer and introducing nutrients from below. Because of the correlation, research suggests that EKE could be used to predict chlorophyll blooms.

Haida eddies affect zooplankton distribution by transporting nearshore species into the deep ocean. During the first summer that an eddy moves offshore, nearshore species often dominate zooplankton communities, but decline after one or two years as the eddy dissipates. Species that perform diel vertical migration can remain in the eddy core for longer periods of time.

The influence of Haida eddies on larger organisms remains poorly understood. They are thought to influence winter feeding habits of northern fur seals by providing food at a low energy expense. Ichthyoplankton composition within eddies is significantly different than that of surrounding ocean water. The species composition is based on where an eddy forms, and thus what coastal species it acquired. Fish larval species richness correlates with distance from an eddy center, with higher richness closer to the core. The icthyoplankton communities also change depending on the age of the eddy.

== See also ==
- Mesoscale ocean eddies
- Baroclinity
- Ekman transport
- Aleutian Low
