= Modon =

Modon may refer to:

- The name given by the Venetians to the town of Methoni, Messenia, in Greece
- Latin Bishopric of Modon, a titular diocese of the Roman Catholic church whose seat was Methoni
- MODON, a business name of the Saudi Industrial Property Authority
- Modon (river), a tributary of the Cher, in France
- Modon (fluid dynamics), or dipole eddy pair.
