= Modon (fluid dynamics) =

Sea eddies

Modons or dipole eddy pairs, are eddies that can carry water over distances of more than 1000 km in the ocean, in different directions than usual sea currents like Rossby waves, and much faster than other eddies.

== History ==
The name modon was coined by M. E. Stern as a pun on the joint USA-USSR oceanographic research program POLYMODE. The modon is a dipole-vortex solution to the potential-vorticity equation that was theorized in order to explain anomalous atmospheric blocking events and eddy structures in rotating fluids, and the first solution was obtained by Stern in 1975. However, this solution was imperfect because it was not continuous at the modon boundary, so other scientists, such as Larichev and Reznik (1976), proposed other solutions that corrected that problem.

Although modons were predicted theoretically in the 1970s, a pair of modons spinning in opposite directions was first identified traveling in 2017 over the Tasman Sea. The study of satellite images has allowed the identification of other modons, at least dating back to 1993, that hadn't been identified as such until then. The scientists that first discovered modons in the wild think that they can absorb small sea creatures and carry them at high speed over long ocean distances. They are also capable of affecting the transport of heat, carbon and nutrients over that area of the ocean. They move about ten times faster than a typical eddy, and can last for six months before being disengaged.

== Equatorial modon ==
In 2019, Rostami and Zeitlin reported a discovery of steady, long-living, slowly eastward-moving large-scale coherent twin cyclones, so-called “equatorial modon,” by means of a moist-convective rotating shallow water model. Crudest barotropic features of MJO such as eastward propagation along the equator, slow phase speed, hydro-dynamical coherent structure, the convergent zone of moist-convection, are captured by Rostami and Zeitlin's modon. Having an exact solution of streamlines for internal and external regions of equatorial asymptotic modon is another feature of this structure. It is shown that such eastward-moving coherent dipolar structures can be produced during geostrophic adjustment of localized large-scale pressure anomalies in the diabatic moist-convective environment on the equator.
