= Sigma-t =

Sigma-t is a quantity used in oceanography to measure the density of seawater at a given temperature. σ_{T} is defined as ρ(S,T)-1000 kg m^{−3}, where ρ(S,T) is the density of a sample of seawater at temperature T and salinity S, measured in kg m^{−3}, at standard atmospheric pressure. For example, a water sample with a density of 1.027 g/cm^{3} has a σ_{T} value of 27.

== See also ==
- Density of saltwater and ice
