= Anticyclonic rotation =

Anticyclonic rotation, or anticyclonic circulation, is atmospheric motion in the direction opposite to a cyclonic rotation. For cyclonic rotation, this motion is in a counter-clockwise direction in the Northern Hemisphere and clockwise in the Southern Hemisphere. Thus, just anticyclonic rotation would mean clockwise in the Northern Hemisphere and counter-clockwise in the Southern. For large-scale weather systems, greater than approximately 500 km (310 mi), anticyclonic rotation only occurs for high-pressure systems. This is due to how the Coriolis effect acts on high-pressure systems. Large, low-pressure systems, such as tropical cyclones, have cyclonic rotation. Small scale rotating atmospheric features, such as tornadoes, water spouts, and dust devils can have either anticyclonic or cyclonic rotation, since the direction of their spin depends on local forces rather than the Coriolis effect.
