= Cyclonic rotation =

Atmospheric motion matching a planet's rotation

Cyclonic rotation or cyclonic circulation is the atmospheric motion in the same direction as a planet's rotation, as opposed to anticyclonic rotation. In the case of Earth's rotation, the Coriolis effect causes cyclonic rotation to be in a counterclockwise direction in the Northern Hemisphere and clockwise in the Southern Hemisphere. A closed area of winds rotating cyclonically is known as a cyclone.

Cyclonic rotation is characteristic of the vast majority of violent tornadoes and of mesocyclones, which are regions of rotation of storm-scale, 2-6 miles across, an area that is much larger than that of any tornado that may be in it.

In contrast to cyclonic rotation, rotation in the opposite direction of the Earth's rotation is called anticyclonic rotation.
