= Mixed layer =

Layer in which active turbulence has homogenized some range of depths

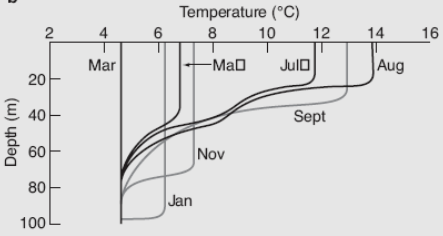
Depth of Mixed Layer versus temperature, along with relationship to different months of the year

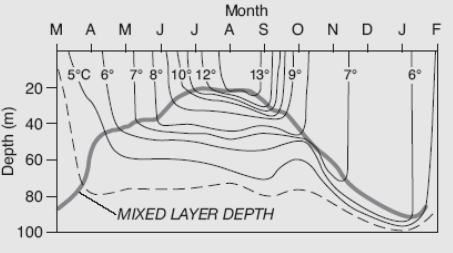
Depth of Mixed Layer versus the month of the year, along with relationship to temperature

The oceanic or limnological mixed layer is a layer in which active turbulence has homogenized some range of depths. The surface mixed layer is a layer in which this turbulence is generated by winds, surface heat fluxes, or processes such as evaporation or sea ice formation which result in an increase in salinity. The atmospheric mixed layer is a zone having nearly constant potential temperature and specific humidity with height. The depth of the atmospheric mixed layer is known as the mixing height. Turbulence typically plays a role in the formation of fluid mixed layers.

== Oceanic mixed layer ==
=== Importance of the mixed layer ===
The mixed layer plays an important role in the physical climate. Because the specific heat of ocean water is much larger than that of air, the top 2.5 m of the ocean holds as much heat as the entire atmosphere above it. Thus the heat required to change a mixed layer of 2.5 m by 1 °C would be sufficient to raise the temperature of the atmosphere by 1 °C. The depth of the mixed layer is thus very important for determining the temperature range in oceanic and coastal regions. In addition, the heat stored within the oceanic mixed layer provides a source for heat that drives global variability such as El Niño.

The mixed layer is also important as its depth determines the average level of light seen by marine organisms. In very deep mixed layers, the tiny marine organisms known as phytoplankton are unable to get enough light to maintain their metabolism. The deepening of the mixed layer in the wintertime in the North Atlantic is therefore associated with a strong decrease in surface chlorophyll a. However, this deep mixing also replenishes near-surface nutrient stocks. Thus when the mixed layer becomes shallow in the spring, and light levels increase, there is often a concomitant increase of phytoplankton biomass, known as the "spring bloom".

=== Oceanic mixed layer formation ===
There are three primary sources of energy for driving turbulent mixing within the open-ocean mixed layer. The first is the ocean waves, which act in two ways. The first is the generation of turbulence near the ocean surface, which acts to stir light water downwards. Although this process injects a great deal of energy into the upper few meters, most of it dissipates relatively rapidly. If ocean currents vary with depth, waves can interact with them to drive the process known as Langmuir circulation, large eddies that stir down to depths of tens of meters. The second is wind-driven currents, which create layers in which there are velocity shears. When these shears reach sufficient magnitude, they can eat into stratified fluid. This process is often described and modelled as an example of Kelvin-Helmholtz instability, though other processes may play a role as well. Finally, if cooling, addition of brine from freezing sea ice, or evaporation at the surface causes the surface density to increase, convection will occur. The deepest mixed layers (exceeding 2000 m in regions such as the Labrador Sea) are formed through this final process, which is a form of Rayleigh–Taylor instability. Early models of the mixed layer such as those of Mellor and Durbin included the final two processes. In coastal zones, large velocities due to tides may also play an important role in establishing the mixed layer.

The mixed layer is characterized by being nearly uniform in properties such as temperature and salinity throughout the layer. Velocities, however, may exhibit significant shears within the mixed layer. The bottom of the mixed layer is characterized by a gradient, where the water properties change. Oceanographers use various definitions of the number to use as the mixed layer depth at any given time, based on making measurements of physical properties of the water. Often, an abrupt temperature change called a thermocline occurs to mark the bottom of the mixed layer; sometimes there may be an abrupt salinity change called a halocline that occurs as well. The combined influence of temperature and salinity changes results in an abrupt density change, or pycnocline. Additionally, sharp gradients in nutrients (nutricline) and oxygen (oxycline) and a maximum in chlorophyll concentration are often co-located with the base of the seasonal mixed layer.

=== Oceanic mixed layer depth determination ===
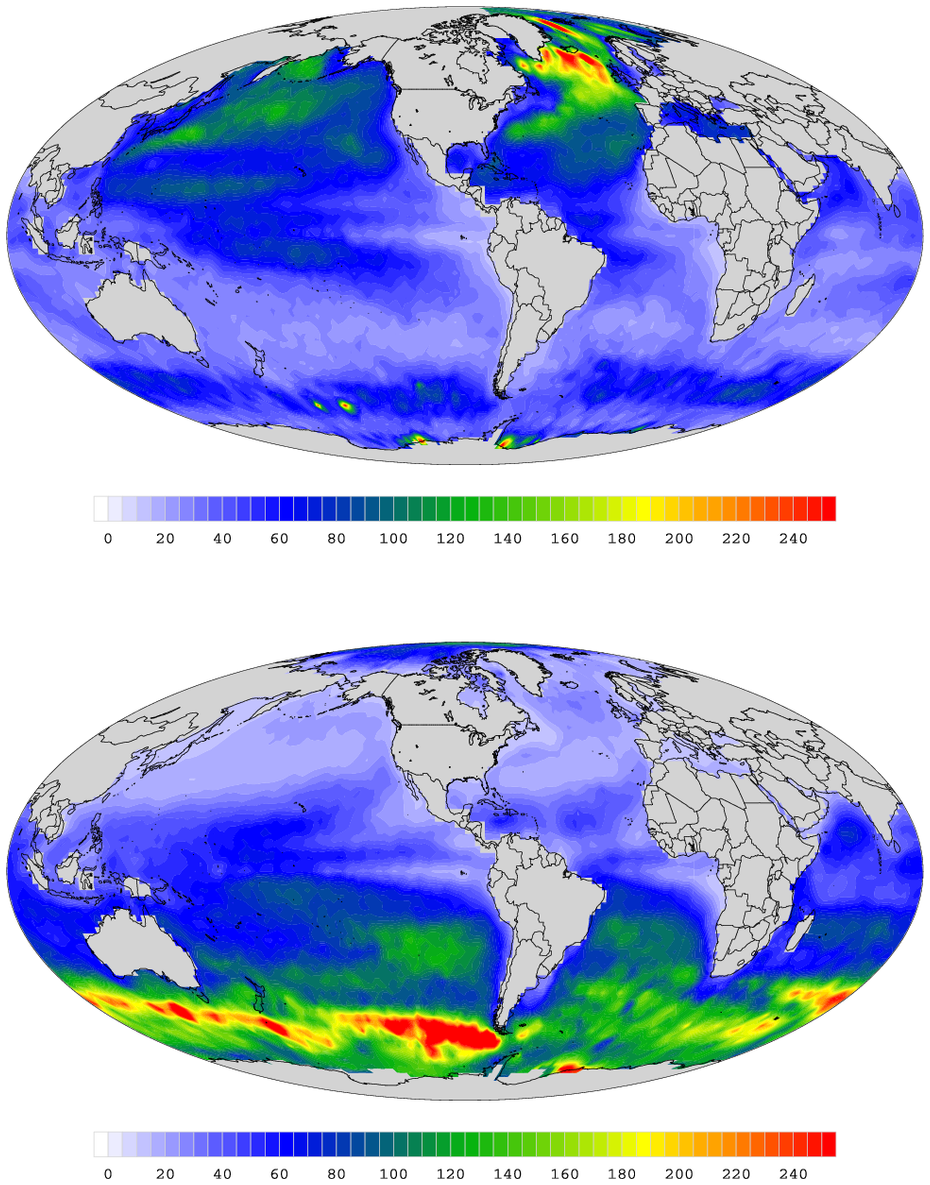
Mixed layer depth climatology for boreal winter(upper image) and boreal summer(lower image).

The depth of the mixed layer is often determined by hydrography—making measurements of water properties. Two criteria often used to determine the mixed layer depth are temperature and sigma-t (density) change from a reference value (usually the surface measurement). The temperature criterion used in Levitus (1982) defines the mixed layer as the depth at which the temperature change from the surface temperature is 0.5 °C. However, work done by Kara et al. (2000) suggest that the temperature difference is closer to .8 °C. The sigma-t (density) criterion used in Levitus uses the depth at which a change from the surface sigma-t of 0.125 has occurred. Neither criterion implies that active mixing is occurring to the mixed layer depth at all times. Rather, the mixed layer depth estimated from hydrography is a measure of the depth to which mixing occurs over the course of a few weeks.

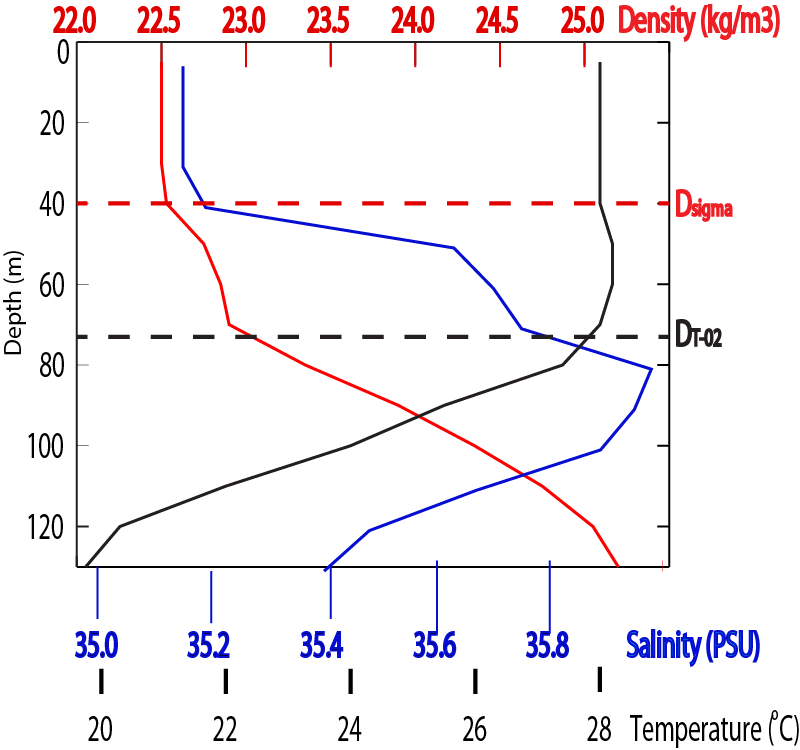
An example of barrier layer thickness for an Argo profile taken January 31, 2002 in the tropical Indian Ocean. The red line is the density profile, black line is temperature, and the blue line is salinity. One mixed layer depth, D_{T-02}, is defined as the depth at which the surface temperature cools by 0.2°C (black dashed line). The density defined mixed layer, D_{sigma}, is 40 m (red dashed line) and is defined as the surface density plus the density difference brought about by the temperature increment of 0.2°C. Above D_{sigma} the water is both isothermal and isohaline. The difference between D_{T-02} minus D_{sigma} is the barrier layer thickness (blue arrows on the figure) .

=== Barrier layer thickness ===
The barrier layer thickness (BLT) is a layer of water separating the well-mixed surface layer from the thermocline. A more precise definition would be the difference between mixed layer depth (MLD) calculated from temperature minus the mixed layer depth calculated using density. The first reference to this difference as the barrier layer was in a paper describing observations in the western Pacific as part of the Western Equatorial Pacific Ocean Circulation Study. In regions where the barrier layer is present, stratification is stable because of strong buoyancy forcing associated with a fresh (i.e. more buoyant) water mass sitting on top of the water column.

In the past, a typical criterion for MLD was the depth at which the surface temperature cools by some change in temperature from surface values. For example, Levitus used 0.5 °C. In the example to the right, 0.2 °C is used to define the MLD (i.e. D_{T-02} in the Figure). Prior to the abundant subsurface salinity available from Argo, this was the main methodology for calculating the oceanic MLD. More recently, a density criterion has been used to define the MLD. The density-derived MLD is defined as the depth where the density increases from the surface value due to a prescribed temperature decrease of some value (e.g. 0.2 °C) from the surface value while maintaining constant surface salinity value. (i.e. D_{T-02} - D_{sigma}).

==== BLT regimes ====
Large values of the BLT are typically found in the equatorial regions and can be as high as 50 m. Above the barrier layer, the well mixed layer may be due to local precipitation exceeding evaporation (e.g. in the western Pacific), monsoon related river runoff (e.g. in the northern Indian Ocean), or advection of salty water subducted in the subtropics (found in all subtropical ocean gyres). Barrier layer formation in the subtropics is associated with seasonal change in the mixed layer depth, a sharper gradient in sea surface salinity (SSS) than normal, and subduction across this SSS front. In particular, the barrier layer is formed in winter season in the equatorward flank of subtropical salinity maxima. During early winter, the atmosphere cools the surface and strong wind and negative buoyancy forcing mixes temperature to a deep layer. At this same time, fresh surface salinity is advected from the rainy regions in the tropics. The deep temperature layer along with strong stratification in the salinity gives the conditions for barrier layer formation.

For the western Pacific, the mechanism for barrier layer formation is different. Along the equator, the eastern edge of the warm pool (typically 28 °C isotherm - see SST plot in the western Pacific) is a demarcation region between warm fresh water to the west and cold, salty, upwelled water in the central Pacific. A barrier layer is formed in the isothermal layer when salty water is subducted (i.e. a denser water mass moves below another) from the east into the warm pool due to local convergence or warm fresh water overrides denser water to the east. Here, weak winds, heavy precipitation, eastward advection of low salinity water, westward subduction of salty water and downwelling equatorial Kelvin or Rossby waves are factors that contribute to deep BLT formation.

==== Importance of BLT ====
Prior to El Nino, the warm pool stores heat and is confined to the far western Pacific. During the El Nino, the warm pool migrates eastward along with the concomitant precipitation and current anomalies. The fetch of the westerlies is increased during this time, reinforcing the event. Using data from the ship of opportunity and Tropical Atmosphere – Ocean (TAO) moorings in the western Pacific, the east and west migration of the warm pool was tracked over 1992-2000 using sea surface salinity (SSS), sea surface temperature (SST), currents, and subsurface data from Conductivity, temperature, depth taken on various research cruises. This work showed that during westward flow, the BLT in the western Pacific along the equator (138^{o}E-145^{o}E, 2^{o}N-2^{o}S) was between 18 m – 35 m corresponding with warm SST and serving as an efficient storage mechanism for heat. Barrier layer formation is driven by westward (i.e. converging and subducting) currents along the equator near the eastern edge of the salinity front that defines the warm pool. These westward currents are driven by downwelling Rossby waves and represent either a westward advection of BLT or a preferential deepening of the deeper thermocline versus the shallower halocline due to Rossby wave dynamics (i.e. these waves favor vertical stretching of the upper water column). During El Nino, westerly winds drive the warm pool eastward allowing fresh water to ride on top of the local colder/saltier/denser water to the east. Using coupled, atmospheric/ocean models and tuning the mixing to eliminate BLT for one year prior to El Nino, it was shown that the heat buildup associated with barrier layer is a requirement for big El Nino. It has been shown that there is a tight relationship between SSS and SST in the western Pacific and the barrier layer is instrumental in maintaining heat and momentum in the warm pool within the salinity stratified layer. Later work, including Argo drifters, confirm the relationship between eastward migration of the warm pool during El Nino and barrier layer heat storage in the western Pacific. The main impact of barrier layer is to maintain a shallow mixed layer allowing an enhanced air-sea coupled response. In addition, BLT is the key factor in establishing the mean state that is perturbed during El Nino/La Niña

== Limnological mixed layer formation ==
Formation of a mixed layer in a lake is similar to that in the ocean, but mixing is more likely to occur in lakes solely due to the molecular properties of water. Water changes density as it changes temperature. In lakes, temperature structure is complicated by the fact that fresh water is heaviest at 3.98 °C (degrees Celsius). Thus in lakes where the surface gets very cold, the mixed layer briefly extends all the way to the bottom in the spring, as surface warms as well as in the fall, as the surface cools. This overturning is often important for maintaining the oxygenation of very deep lakes.

The study of limnology encompasses all inland water bodies, including bodies of water with salt in them. In saline lakes and seas (such as the Caspian Sea), mixed layer formation generally behaves similarly to the ocean.

== Atmospheric mixed layer formation ==
The atmospheric mixed layer results from convective air motions, typically seen towards the middle of the day when air at the surface is warmed and rises. It is thus mixed by Rayleigh–Taylor instability. The standard procedure for determining the mixed layer depth is to examine the profile of potential temperature, the temperature which the air would have if it were brought to the pressure found at the surface without gaining or losing heat. As such an increase of pressure involves compressing the air, the potential temperature is higher than the in-situ temperature, with the difference increasing as one goes higher in the atmosphere. The atmospheric mixed layer is defined as a layer of (approximately) constant potential temperature, or a layer in which the temperature falls at a rate of approximately 10 °C/km, provided it is free of clouds. Such a layer may have gradients in the humidity, though. As is the case with the ocean mixed layer, velocities will not be constant throughout the atmospheric mixed layer.
