= Isopycnal =

Line connecting points of a specific density or potential density

Isopycnals /ˌaɪsəˈpɪknl/ are layers within the ocean that are stratified based on their densities and can be shown as a line connecting points of a specific density or potential density on a graph. Isopycnals are often displayed graphically to help visualize "layers" of the water in the ocean or gases in the atmosphere in a similar manner to how contour lines are used in topographic maps to help visualize topography.

== Oceanography ==
Water masses in the ocean are characterized by their properties. Factors such as density, temperature, and salinity can all be used to identify these masses and their origins as well as where they are in the water column. Density plays a large role in stratifying the ocean into layers. In a body of water, as the depth increases, so does the density; water masses with the highest density are at the bottom and the lowest densities are at the top. Typically, warm freshwater is less dense than cold salty water, thus the colder water will sink below the warmer water. Isopycnals are used to display this vertical distribution of the water. Variations in temperature and salinity along isopycnals can be described with spiciness. This creates distinguishable layers of water with differing physical properties. This phenomenon is called stratification. The strata are held in place by the large differences in physical and chemical properties between layers that prevent mixing.Turbulence can disturb boundaries between the layers, causing them to bend, which causes the isopycnals to appear uneven. These boundaries are known as diapycnals (Talley, 162). The ways in which the isopycnals and diapycnals are transformed can be used by oceanographers to identify the force that caused the underwater disturbance.

=== Mixing ===
Isopycnal mixing and diapycnal mixing work together to mix and ventilate the entire ocean. Isopycnal mixing is when surface waters moving into the interior of the ocean typically run horizontally, along the isopycnal layers, settling into their correct density-dependent layer. This process is important for ventilating the ocean with oxygen. Diapycnal mixing is the movement of water by either upwelling or downwelling. This mixing is occurring vertically, across the isopycnal layer boundaries. These mixing processes are essential for nutrient distribution and the upwelling of cold bottom water. Mixing of waters of the same densities is easier than across densities which is why diapycnal mixing does not occur as frequently as isopycnal mixing.

== Meteorology ==
In meteorology, isopycnals are used to display different layers of gases in the atmosphere. In the atmosphere, varying degrees of humidity, temperature, and pressure change the density of air. Isopycnals are not used in meteorology as frequently as they are in oceanography, since the density gradients observed in the atmosphere are typically gradual, unlike in stratified bodies of water. In these cases, isopycnals are less relevant, as they do not display any substantial features.

== See also ==
- Atmosphere of Earth
- Internal wave

== Sources ==
- Talley, Lynne D. (2011), Talley, Lynne D.; Pickard, George L.; Emery, William J. (eds.), Descriptive physical oceanography: an introduction (6th ed.), Amsterdam; Boston: Academic Press, ISBN 978-0-7506-4552-2, OCLC 720651296
