= High-nutrient, low-chlorophyll regions =

Ocean regions with little phytoplankton

High-nutrient, low-chlorophyll (HNLC) regions are regions of the ocean where the abundance of phytoplankton is low and fairly constant despite the availability of macronutrients. Phytoplankton rely on a suite of nutrients for cellular function. Macronutrients (e.g., nitrate, phosphate, silicic acid) are generally available in higher quantities in surface ocean waters, and are the typical components of common garden fertilizers. Micronutrients (e.g., iron, zinc, cobalt) are generally available in lower quantities and include trace metals. Macronutrients are typically available in millimolar concentrations, while micronutrients are generally available in micro- to nanomolar concentrations. In general, nitrogen tends to be a limiting ocean nutrient, but in HNLC regions it is never significantly depleted. Instead, these regions tend to be limited by low concentrations of metabolizable iron. Iron is a critical phytoplankton micronutrient necessary for enzyme catalysis and electron transport.

Between the 1930s and '80s, it was hypothesized that iron is a limiting ocean micronutrient, but there were not sufficient methods reliably to detect iron in seawater to confirm this hypothesis. In 1989, high concentrations of iron-rich sediments in nearshore coastal waters off the Gulf of Alaska were detected. However, offshore waters had lower iron concentrations and lower productivity despite macronutrient availability for phytoplankton growth. This pattern was observed in other oceanic regions and led to the naming of three major HNLC zones: the North Pacific Ocean, the Equatorial Pacific Ocean, and the Southern Ocean.

The discovery of HNLC regions has fostered scientific debate about the ethics and efficacy of iron fertilization experiments which attempt to draw down atmospheric carbon dioxide by stimulating surface-level photosynthesis. It has also led to the development of hypotheses such as grazing control which poses that HNLC regions are formed, in part, from the grazing of phytoplankton (e.g. dinoflagellates, ciliates) by smaller organisms (e.g. protists).

== Primary production ==
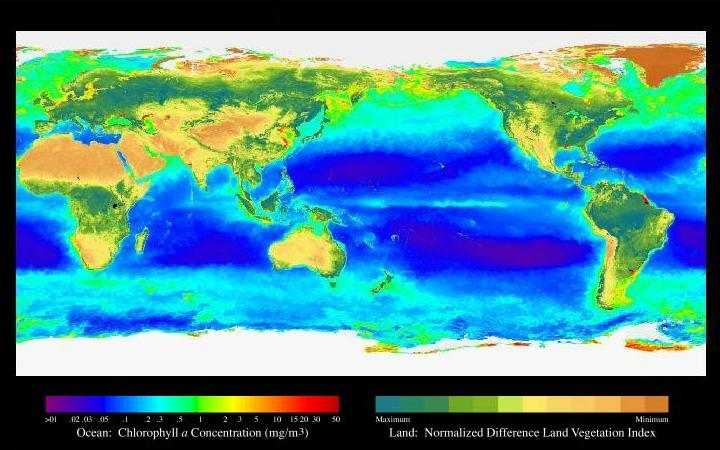
Global distribution of surface chlorophyll levels. Chlorophyll (a proxy for phytoplankton mass) is relatively low in the three HNLC regions (North Pacific, Equatorial Pacific, and Southern Ocean).

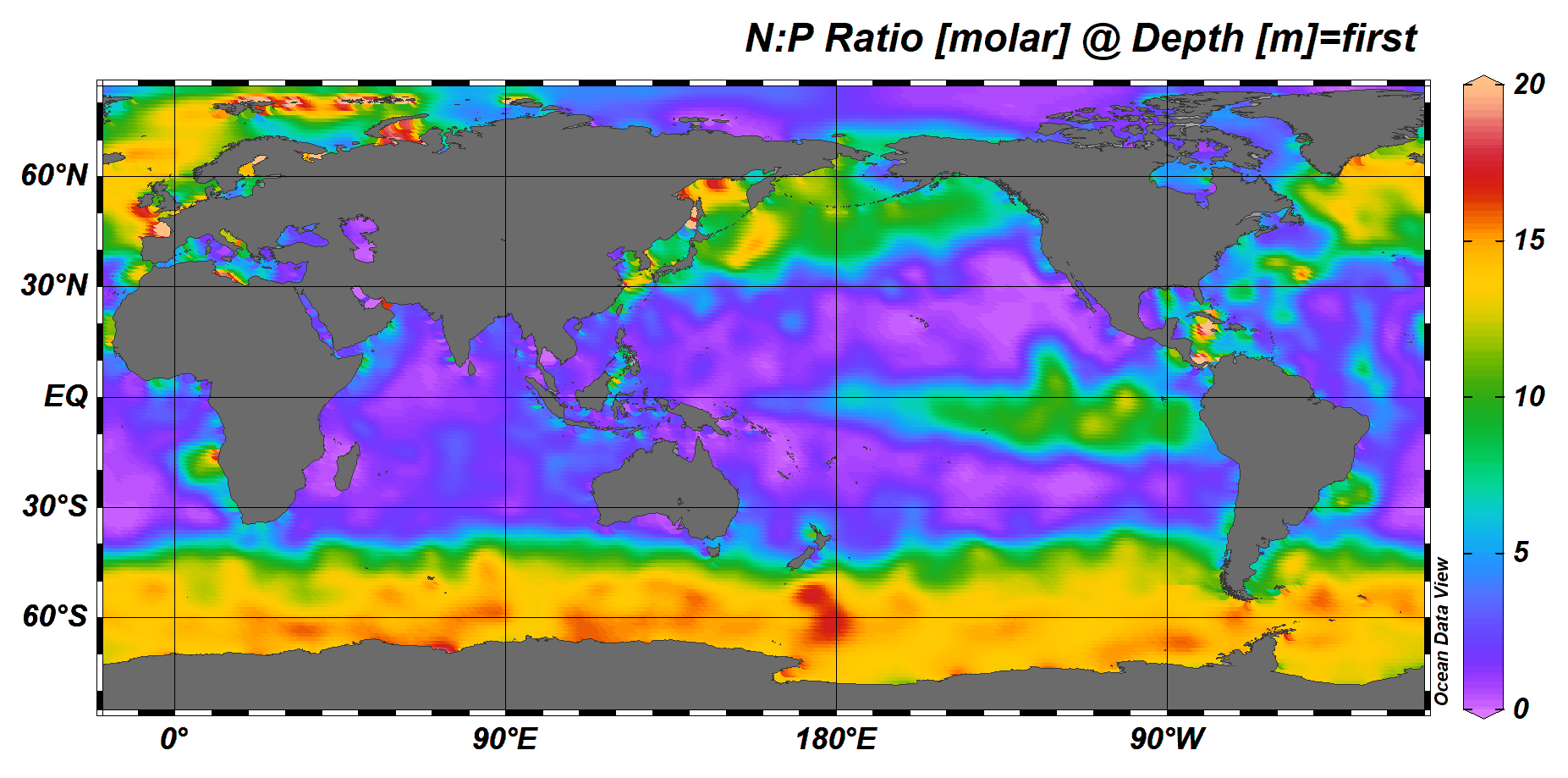
Global nitrogen to phosphorus ratio is plotted for the global surface ocean. Nutrients are available in the three HNLC regions in sufficient RKR Ratios for biological activity.

Primary production is the process by which autotrophs use light to convert carbon from aqueous carbon dioxide to sugar for cellular growth. Light provides the energy for the photosynthetic process and nutrients are incorporated into organic material. For photosynthesis to occur, macronutrients such as nitrate and phosphate must be available in sufficient ratios and bioavailable forms for biological utilization. The molecular ratio of 106(Carbon):16(Nitrogen):1(Phosphorus) was deduced by Redfield, Ketcham, and Richards (RKR) and is known as the Redfield Ratio. Photosynthesis (forward) and respiration (reverse) is represented by the equation:

$\ce{{106CO2} + {16HNO3} + {H3PO4} + {122H2O} <=> {(CH2O)106(NH3)16(H3PO4)} + {136O2}}$

Photosynthesis can be limited by deficiencies of certain macronutrients. However, in the North Pacific, the Equatorial Pacific, and the Southern Ocean macronutrients are found in sufficient ratios, quantities and bioavailable forms to support greater levels of primary production than found. Macronutrient availability in HNLC regions in tandem with low standing stocks of phytoplankton suggests that some other biogeochemical process limits phytoplankton growth.

Since primary production and phytoplankton biomass cannot currently be measured over entire ocean basins, scientists use chlorophyll α as a proxy for primary production. Modern satellite observations monitor and track global chlorophyll α abundances in the ocean via remote sensing. Higher chlorophyll concentrations generally indicate areas of enhanced primary production, and conversely lower chlorophyll levels indicate low primary production. This co-occurrence of low chlorophyll and high macronutrient availability is why these regions are deemed "high-nutrient, low-chlorophyll."

In addition to the macronutrients needed for organic matter synthesis, phytoplankton need micronutrients such as trace metals for cellular functions. Micronutrient availability can constrain primary production because trace metals are sometimes limiting nutrients. Iron has been determined to be a primary limiting micronutrient in HNLC provinces. Recent studies have indicated that zinc and cobalt may be secondary and/or co-limiting micronutrients.

== Global distribution ==
=== Common characteristics ===
HNLC regions cover 20% of the world’s oceans and are characterized by varying physical, chemical, and biological patterns. These surface waters have annually varying, yet relatively abundant macronutrient concentrations compared to other oceanic provinces. While HNLC broadly describes the biogeochemical trends of these large ocean regions, all three zones experience seasonal phytoplankton blooms in response to global atmospheric patterns. On average, HNLC regions tend to be growth-limited by iron and variably, zinc. This trace metal limitation leads to communities of smaller sized phytoplankton. Compared to more productive regions of the ocean, HNLC zones have higher ratios of silicic acid to nitrate because larger diatoms, that require silicic acid to make their opal silica shells, are less prevalent. Unlike the Southern Ocean and the North Pacific, the Equatorial Pacific experiences temporal silicate availability which leads to large seasonal diatom blooms.

The distribution of trace metals and relative abundance of macronutrients are reflected in the plankton community structure. For example, the selection of phytoplankton with a high surface area to volume ratio results in HNLC regions being dominated by nano- and picoplankton. This ratio allows for optimal utilization of available dissolved nutrients. Larger phytoplankton, such as diatoms, cannot energetically sustain themselves in these regions. Common picoplankton within these regions include genera such as prochlorococcus (not generally found in the North Pacific), synechococcus, and various eukaryotes. Grazing protists likely control the abundance and distribution of these small phytoplankton.

The generally lower net primary production in HNLC zones results in lower biological draw-down of atmospheric carbon dioxide and thus these regions are generally considered a net source of carbon dioxide to the atmosphere. HNLC areas are of interest to geoengineers and some in the scientific community who believe fertilizing large patches of these waters with iron could potentially lower dissolved carbon dioxide and offset increased anthropogenic carbon emissions. Analysis of Antarctic ice core data over the last million years shows correlation between high levels of dust and low temperature, indicating that addition of diffuse iron-rich dust to the sea has been a natural amplifier of climate cooling.

=== North Pacific ===
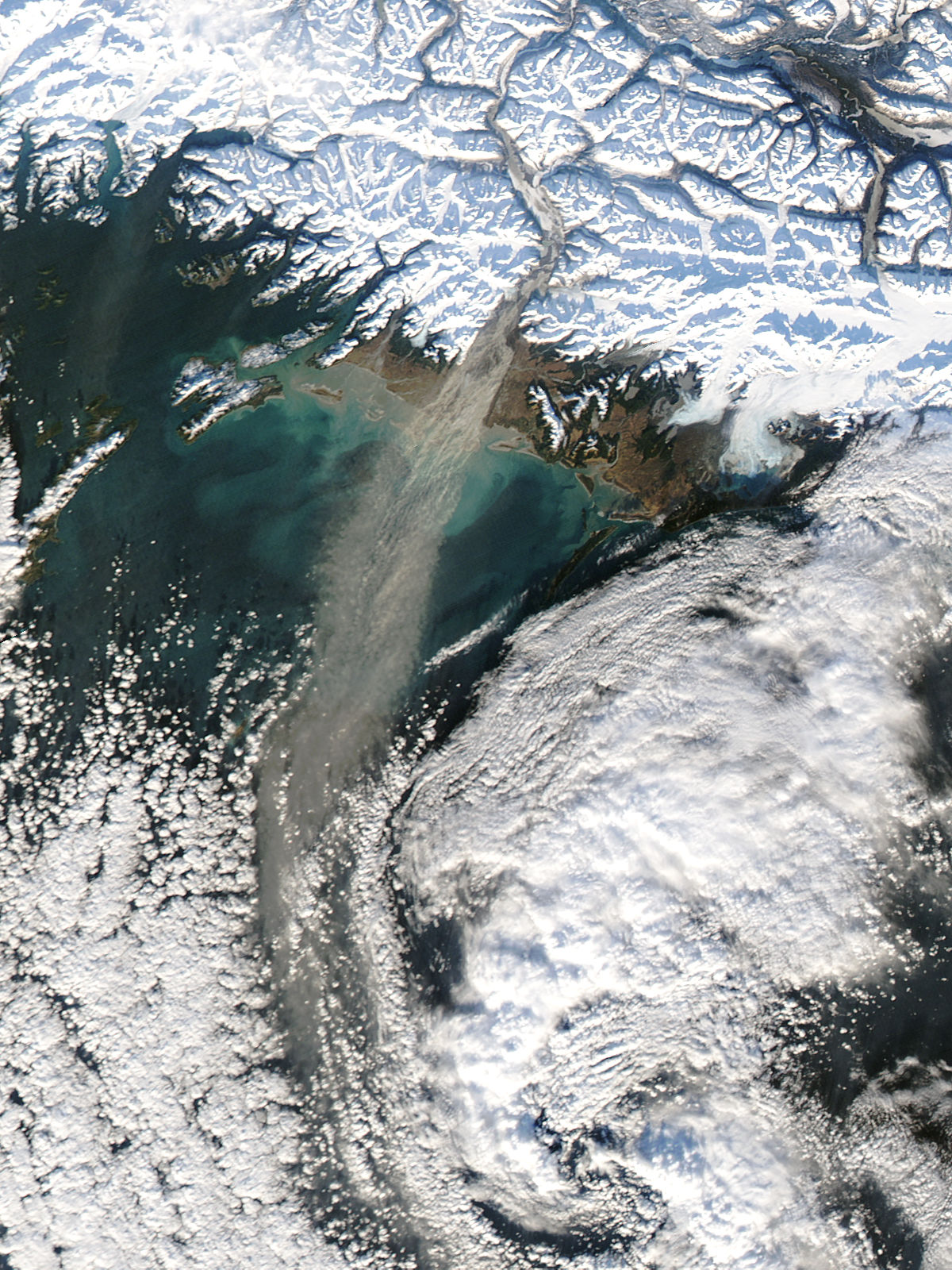
Dust blown off the Alaskan coast into the North Pacific.

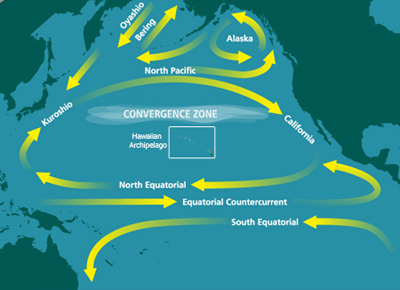
Currents in the North Pacific Ocean.

The discovery and naming of the first HNLC region, the North Pacific, was formalized in a seminal paper published in 1988. The study concluded that surface waters of the eastern North Pacific are generally dominated by picoplankton despite the relative abundance of macronutrients. In other words, larger phytoplankton, such as diatoms which thrive in nutrient-rich waters, were not found. Instead, the surface waters were replete with smaller pico- and nanoplankton. Based on laboratory nutrient experiments, iron was hypothesized to be a key limiting micronutrient.

The Pacific Ocean is the largest and oldest body of water on Earth. The North Pacific is characterized by the general clockwise rotation of the North Pacific gyre, which is driven by trade winds. Spatial variations in tradewinds result in cooler air temperatures in the western North Pacific and milder air temperatures in the eastern North Pacific (i.e., Subarctic Pacific). Iron is supplied to the North Pacific by dust storms that occur in Asia and Alaska as well as iron-rich waters advected from the continental margin, sometimes by eddies such as Haida Eddies.

Concentrations of iron however vary throughout the year. Ocean currents are driven by seasonal atmospheric patterns which transport iron from the Kuril-Kamchatka margin into the western Subarctic Pacific. This introduction of iron provides a subsurface supply of micronutrients, which can be used by primary producers during upwelling of deeper waters to the surface. Seafloor depth may also stimulate phytoplankton blooms in HNLC regions as iron diffuses from the seafloor and alleviates iron limitation in shallow waters. Research conducted in the Gulf of Alaska showed that areas with shallow waters, such as the south shelf of Alaska, have more intense phytoplankton blooms than offshore waters. Volcanic ash from the eruption of the Kasatochi volcano in August 2008 provided an example of natural iron fertilization in the Northeast Pacific Ocean. The region was fertilized by raining volcanic dust containing soluble iron. In the days following, phytoplankton blooms were visible from space.

Limitations in trace metal concentrations in the North Pacific limit diatom blooms throughout the entire year. Even though the North Pacific is an HNLC region, it produces and exports to the ocean interior a relatively high amount of particulate biogenic silica compared to the North Atlantic, which supports significant diatom growth.

=== Equatorial Pacific ===
The Equatorial Pacific is an oceanic province characterized by nearly year-round upwelling due to the convergence of trade winds from the northeast and southeast at the Intertropical Convergence Zone. The Equatorial Pacific spans nearly half of Earth’s circumference and plays a major role in global marine new primary production. New production is a term used in biological oceanography to describe the way in which nitrogen is recycled within the ocean. In regions of enhanced new production, nitrate from the aphotic zone makes its way into surface waters, replenishing surface nitrate supply. Despite nitrogen availability in Equatorial Pacific waters, primary production and observed surface ocean biomass are considerably lower compared to other major upwelling regions of the ocean. Thus the Equatorial Pacific is considered one of the three major HNLC regions.

Like other major HNLC provinces, the Equatorial Pacific is considered nutrient-limited due to lack of trace metals such as iron. The Equatorial Pacific receives approximately 7-10 times more iron from Equatorial Undercurrent (EUC) upwelling than from inputs due to settling atmospheric dust. Climate reconstructions of glacial periods using sediment proxy records have revealed that the Equatorial Pacific may have been 2.5 times more productive than the modern equatorial ocean. During these glacial periods, the Equatorial Pacific increased its export of marine new production, thus providing a sink of atmospheric carbon dioxide. The science of paleoceanography attempts to understand the interplay of glacial cycles with ocean dynamics. Paleo-oceanographers currently challenge the Aeolian Dust hypothesis which suggests that the atmospheric transport of iron-rich dust off Central and South America controls the intensity of primary production in the Equatorial Pacific. One study suggests that because EUC upwelling provides most of the bioavailable iron to the equatorial surface waters, the only method to reverse HNLC conditions is by enhancing upwelling. In other words, enhanced regional upwelling, rather than iron-rich atmospheric dust deposition, may explain why this region experiences higher primary productivity during glacial periods.

Compared to the North Pacific and Southern Ocean, Equatorial Pacific waters have relatively low levels of biogenic silica and thus do not support significant standing stocks of diatoms. Picoplankton are the most abundant marine primary producers in these regions due mainly to their ability to assimilate low concentrations of trace metals. Various phytoplankton communities within the Equatorial Pacific are grazed at the same rate as their growth rate, which further limits primary production.

There is no current consensus regarding which of the two main hypotheses (grazing or micronutrients) controls production in these equatorial waters. It is likely that trace metal limitations select for smaller-celled organisms, which thereby increases the grazing pressure of protists. While the Equatorial Pacific maintains HNLC characteristics, productivity can be high at times. Productivity leads to an abundance of seabirds such as storm petrels near the convergence of subtropical water and the equatorial "cold tongue." The Equatorial Pacific contains the world's largest yellowfin tuna fisheries and is home to the spotted dolphin.

=== Southern Ocean ===
A schematic of Antarctic currents. Movement of surface water away from the continent pulls water up from depth.

The Southern Ocean is the largest HNLC region in the global ocean. The surface waters of the Southern Ocean have been widely identified as being rich in macronutrients despite low phytoplankton stocks. Iron deposited in the North Atlantic is incorporated into North Atlantic Deep Water and is transported to the Southern Ocean via thermohaline circulation. Eventually mixing with the Antarctic Circumpolar Water, upwelling provides iron and macronutrients to the Southern Ocean surface waters. Therefore, iron inputs and primary production in the Southern Ocean are sensitive to iron-rich Saharan dust deposited over the Atlantic. Because of low atmospheric dust inputs directly onto Southern Ocean surface waters, chlorophyll α concentrations are low. Light availability in the Southern Ocean changes dramatically seasonally, but it does not seem to be a significant constraint on phytoplankton growth.

Macronutrients present in Southern Ocean surface waters come from upwelled deep water. While micronutrients such as zinc and cobalt may possibly co-limit phytoplankton growth in the Southern Ocean, iron appears to be a critical limiting micronutrient. Some regions of the Southern Ocean experience both adequate bioavailable iron and macronutrient concentrations yet phytoplankton growth is limited. Hydrographic studies and explorations of the Southern Drake Passage region have observed this phenomenon around the Crozet Islands, Kerguelen Islands, and South Georgia and the South Sandwich Islands. These areas are adjacent to shelf regions of Antarctica and islands of the Southern Ocean. The micronutrients required for algal growth are believed to be supplied from the shelves themselves. Except in areas close to the Antarctic shelf, micronutrient deficiency severely limits productivity in the Southern Ocean.

Iron availability is not the only regulator of phytoplankton productivity and biomass. In the Southern Ocean, prevailing low temperatures are believed to have a negative impact on phytoplankton growth rates. Phytoplankton growth rate is very intense and short lived in open areas surrounded by sea ice and permanent sea-ice zones. Grazing by herbivores such as krill, copepods and salps is believed to suppress phytoplankton standing stock. Unlike the open waters of the Southern Ocean, grazing along continental shelf margins is low, so most phytoplankton that are not consumed sink to the sea floor which provides nutrients to benthic organisms.

== Hypotheses ==
Given the remote location of HNLC areas, scientists have combined modeling and observational data in order to study limits on primary production. Combining these two data sources allows for comparison between the North Pacific, Equatorial Pacific, and Southern Ocean. Two current explanations for global HNLC regions are growth limitations due to iron availability and phytoplankton grazing controls.

=== Iron hypothesis ===
In 1988, John Martin confirmed the hypothesis that iron limits phytoplankton blooms and growth rates in the North Pacific. His work was extrapolated to other HNLC regions through evidence which linked low surface iron concentration with low chlorophyll. In response to iron fertilization experiments (IronEx, SOIREE, SEEDS, etc.) in HNLC areas, large phytoplankton responses such as decreased surface nutrient concentration and increased biological activity were observed.

Iron fertilization studies conducted at repeated intervals over the span of a week have produced a larger biological response than a single fertilization event. The biological response size tends to depend on a site’s biological, chemical, and physical characteristics. In the Equatorial and North Pacific, silica is thought to constrain additional production after iron fertilization, while light limits additional production in the Southern Ocean. Native, smaller phytoplankton were initial responders to increased iron, but were quickly outcompeted by larger, coastal phytoplankton such as diatoms. The large bloom response and community shift has led to environmental concerns about fertilizing large sections of HNLC regions. One study suggests that diatoms grow preferentially during fertilization experiments. Some diatoms, such as pseudo-nitzschia, release the neurotoxin domoic acid, poisoning grazing fish. If diatoms grow preferentially during iron fertilization experiments, sustained fertilizations could enhance domoic acid poisoning in the marine food web near fertilized patches.

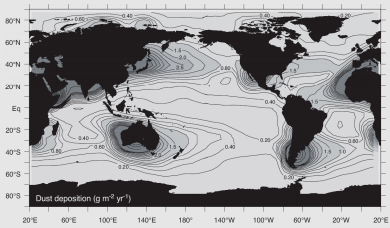
Global dust deposition from wind. The three HNLC regions (North Pacific, Equatorial Pacific, and Southern Ocean) receive little atmospheric dust, leading to iron deficiencies.

==== Aeolian dust ====
Iron enters remote HNLC regions through two primary methods: upwelling of nutrient-rich water and atmospheric dust deposition. Iron needs to be replenished frequently and in bioavailable forms because of its insolubility, rapid uptake through biological systems, and binding affinity with ligands. Dust deposition might not result in phytoplankton blooms unless settling dust is in the correct bioavailable form of iron. Additionally, iron must be deposited during productive seasons and coincide with the appropriate RKR-ratios of surface nutrients. Aeolian dust has a larger influence on Northern Hemisphere HNLC regions because more land mass contributes to more dust deposition. Due to the Southern Ocean's isolation from land, upwelling related to eddy diffusivity provides iron to HNLC regions.

=== Grazing control hypothesis ===
Formulated by John Walsh in 1976, the grazing hypothesis states that grazing by heterotrophs suppresses primary productivity in areas of high nutrient concentrations. Predation by microzooplankton primarily accounts for phytoplankton loss in HNLC regions. Grazing by larger zooplankton and advective mixing are also responsible for a small proportion of losses to phytoplankton communities. Constant grazing limits phytoplankton to a low, constant standing stock. Without this grazing pressure, some scientists believe small phytoplankton would produce blooms despite micronutrient depletion because smaller phytoplankton typically have lower iron requirements and can absorb nutrients at a slower rate.

=== Contemporary view ===
Current scientific consensus agrees that HNLC areas lack high productivity because of a combination of iron and physiological limitations, grazing pressure, and physical forcings. The extent to which each factor contributes to low production may differ in each HNLC region. Iron limitation allows for smaller, more iron-frugal phytoplankton to grow at rapid rates, while grazing by microzooplankton maintains stable stocks of these smaller phytoplankton. Once micronutrients become available, grazing may then limit bloom sizes. Additional micronutrient limitations from trace metals like zinc or cobalt may suppress phytoplankton blooms. Turbulent mixing at higher-latitude HNLC regions (North Pacific and Southern Ocean) may mix phytoplankton below the critical depth needed to have community growth.

== Geo-engineering HNLC regions ==
=== Theory ===
The marine carbon cycle. Carbon dioxide is taken up by phytoplankton for photosynthesis and incorporated into the marine food web. When plankton or predator dies, sedimentation of organic matter reaches the seafloor, where carbon can be buried and sequestered. Stimulating phytoplankton blooms is thought to increase sedimentation of particulate organic carbon after the blooms die off, leading to increased carbon sequestration.

Since past iron fertilization experiments have resulted in large phytoplankton blooms, some have suggested that large-scale ocean fertilization experiments should be conducted to draw down inorganic anthropogenic carbon dioxide in the form of particulate organic carbon. Fertilization would stimulate biological productivity, leading to a decrease in the amount of inorganic surface carbon dioxide within a fertilized patch. The bloom would then die off and presumably sink to the deep ocean, taking much of the absorbed carbon dioxide to the seafloor and sequestering it from the short-term carbon cycle in the deep ocean or ocean sediments.

=== Efficiency and efficacy ===
To effectively remove anthropogenic carbon from the atmosphere, iron fertilization would need to result in significant removal of particulate carbon from the surface ocean and transport it to the deep ocean. Various studies estimated that less than 7-10% of carbon taken up during a bloom would be sequestered, and only a 15-25 ppm decrease in atmospheric carbon dioxide would result with sustained global iron fertilization. The amount of carbon dioxide removed may be offset by the fuel cost of acquiring, transporting, and releasing significant amounts of iron into remote HNLC regions.

Many environmental concerns exist for large-scale iron fertilization. While blooms can be studied and traced, scientists still do not know if the extra production gets incorporated into the food chain or falls to the deep ocean after a bloom dies off. Even if carbon is exported to depth, raining organic matter can be respired, potentially creating mid-column anoxic zones or causing acidification of deep ocean water. Pronounced community shifts to diatoms have been observed during fertilization, and it's still unclear if the change in species composition has any long-term environmental effects.

== Energy resources ==
The following is completely theoretical. Testing would be required to determine feasibility, optimum iron concentration per unit area, carbon sequestration by area over time, need for other micro-nutrients, amount of energy required to maintain such a system, and the potential amount of energy produced by the system. This system considers economic feasibility (profitability of bio-fuel products and carbon credits) and risk management.

=== Growth ===
Grazing results in algae being consumed by micro-zooplankton. This predation results in less than 7-10% of carbon being taken to the bottom of the ocean. Growing algae in floating farms could allow these HNLC areas to grow algae for harvest without the problem of predation. Algae grown in floating farms would be recycled through grazing if there was a catastrophic failure of a floating farm, which would limit any environmental damage.

=== Uses ===
Algae grown in floating farms could be harvested and used for food or fuel. All biological life is made up of lipids, carbohydrates, amino acids, and nucleic acids. Whole algae could be turned into animal feed, fertilizer, or bio-char. Separating the lipids from the algae could also create bio-diesel from the lipid content and bio-char from the rest. Of course, the algae could be pumped to the bottom of the ocean, below any grazing pressure for sequestration.

=== Sequestration ===
In a controlled floating farm, the harvest could be sampled to record the amount of algae per unit volume which will indicate the amount of carbon being sequestered. If this carbon is sequestered at the bottom of the ocean, this figure could be used to accurately create carbon credits. Sequestering carbon dioxide on the ocean floor could destroy the unstudied ecosystem and cause undiscovered lifeforms to go extinct.

Carbon sequestration on land does so with desiccated algae. Without sufficient sources of water, bacteria and other life will have a difficult time digesting the sequestered algae. Biofuels, not sold and used as renewable fuel, could be sequestered in abandoned oil wells and coal mines. The volume of bio-diesel and mass of bio-char would provide an accurate figure for producing (when sequestering) and selling (when removing from wells or mines) carbon credits.

== See also ==
- Antarctic krill
- Iron fertilization
- Iron Hypothesis
- John Martin (oceanographer)
- Marine snow
- Primary production
