= Martin curve =

Mathematical representation of particulate organic carbon export to ocean floor

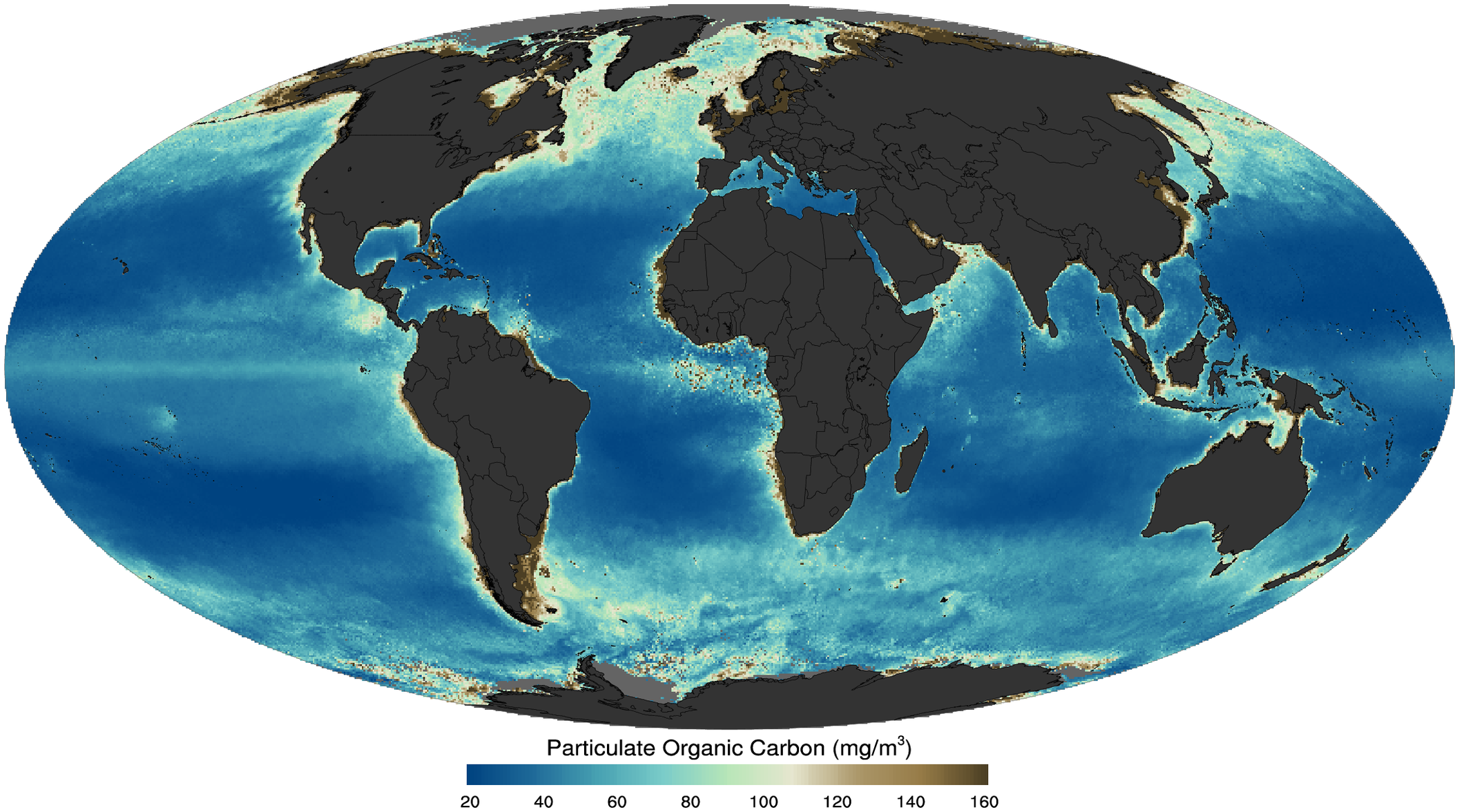
Surface concentrations of particulate organic matter (POM) as imaged by satellite in 2011

The Martin curve is a power law used by oceanographers to describe the export to the ocean floor of particulate organic carbon (POC). The curve is controlled by two parameters: the reference depth in the water column, and a remineralisation parameter which is a measure of the rate at which the vertical flux of POC attenuates. It is named after the American oceanographer John Martin.

The Martin Curve has been used in the study of ocean carbon cycling and has contributed to understanding the role of the ocean in regulating atmospheric CO_{2} level.

== Background ==
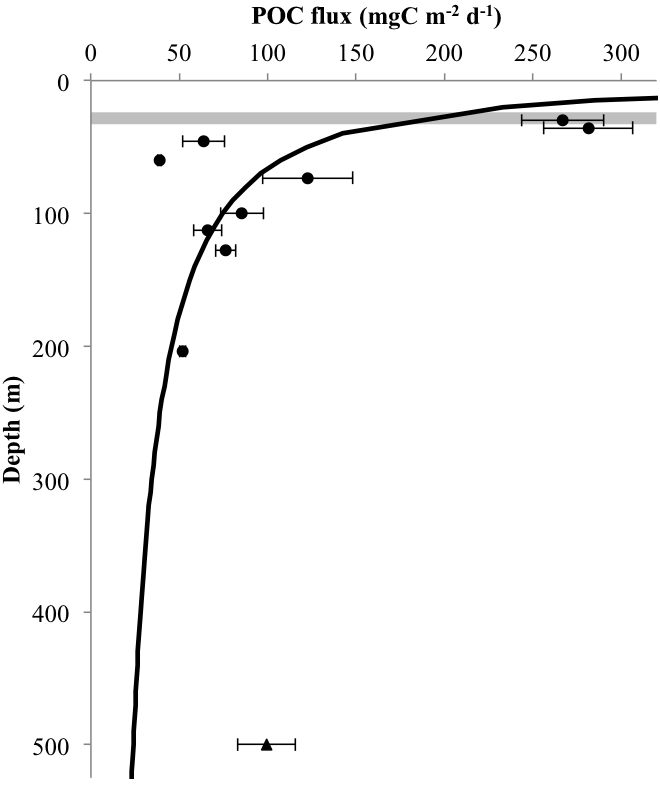
Flux of POC with depth

The dynamics of the particulate organic carbon (POC) pool in the ocean are central to the marine carbon cycle. POC is the link between surface primary production, the deep ocean, and marine sediments. The rate at which POC is degraded in the dark ocean can impact atmospheric CO_{2} concentration.

The biological carbon pump (BCP) is a crucial mechanism by which atmospheric CO_{2} is taken up by the ocean and transported to the ocean interior. Without the BCP, the pre-industrial atmospheric CO_{2} concentration (~280 ppm) would have risen to ~460 ppm. At present, the particulate organic carbon (POC) flux from the surface layer of the ocean to the ocean interior has been estimated to be 4–13 Pg-C year^{−1}. To evaluate the efficiency of the BCP, it is necessary to quantify the vertical attenuation of the POC flux with depth because the deeper that POC is transported, the longer the CO_{2} will be isolated from the atmosphere. Thus, an increase in the efficiency of the BCP has the potential to cause an increase of ocean carbon sequestration of atmospheric CO_{2} that would result in a negative feedback on global warming. Different researchers have investigated the vertical attenuation of the POC flux since the 1980s.

In 1987, Martin et al. proposed the following power law function to describe the POC flux attenuation:

$F_{z}=F_{100} \left(\frac{z}{100}\right)^{-b}$ (1)

where z is water depth (m), and F_{z} and F_{100} are the POC fluxes at depths of z metres and 100 metres respectively. Although other functions, such as an exponential curve, have also been proposed and validated, this power law function, commonly known as the "Martin curve", has been used very frequently in discussions of the BCP. The exponent b in this equation has been used as an index of BCP efficiency: the larger the exponent b, the higher the vertical attenuation rate of the POC flux and the lower the BCP efficiency. Moreover, numerical simulations have shown that a change in the value of b would significantly change the atmospheric CO_{2} concentration.

Subsequently, other researchers have derived alternative remineralization profiles from assumptions about particle degradability and sinking speed. However, the Martin curve has become ubiquitous as the model that assumes slower-sinking and/or labile organic matter is preferentially depleted near the surface causing increasing sinking speed and/or remineralization timescale with depth.

The Martin curve can be expressed in a slightly more general way as:

$$f_p{(z)}=C_pz^{-b}$$

where f_{p}(z) is the fraction of the flux of particulate organic matter from a productive layer near the surface sinking through the depth horizon z [m], C_{p} [m^{b}] is a scaling coefficient, and b is a nondimensional exponent controlling how f_{p} decreases with depth. The equation is often normalised to a reference depth z_{o} but this parameter can be readily absorbed into C_{p}.

== Vertical attenuation rate ==
The vertical attenuation rate of the POC flux is very dependent on the sinking velocity and decomposition rate of POC in the water column. Because POC is labile and has little negative buoyancy, it must be aggregated with relatively heavy materials called ballast to settle gravitationally in the ocean. Materials that may serve as ballast include biogenic opal (hereinafter "opal"), CaCO_{3}, and aluminosilicates. In 1993, Ittekkot hypothesized that the drastic decrease from ~280 to ~200 ppm of atmospheric CO_{2} that occurred during the last glacial maximum was caused by an increase of the input of aeolian dust (aluminosilicate ballast) to the ocean, which strengthened the BCP. In 2002, Klaas and Archer, as well as Francois et al. who compiled and analyzed global sediment trap data, suggested that CaCO_{3}, which has the largest density among possible ballast minerals, is globally the most important and effective facilitator of vertical POC transport, because the transfer efficiency (the ratio of the POC flux in the deep sea to that at the bottom of the surface mixed layer) is higher in subtropical and tropical areas where CaCO_{3} is a major component of marine snow.

Reported sinking velocities of CaCO_{3}-rich particles are high. Numerical simulations that take into account these findings have indicated that future ocean acidification will reduce the efficiency of the BCP by decreasing ocean calcification. In addition, the POC export ratio (the ratio of the POC flux from an upper layer (a fixed depth such as 100 metres, or the euphotic zone or mixed layer) to net primary productivity) in subtropical and tropical areas is low because high temperatures in the upper layer increase POC decomposition rates. The result might be a higher transfer efficiency and a strong positive correlation between POC and CaCO_{3} in these low-latitude areas: labile POC, which is fresher and easier for microbes to break down, decomposes in the upper layer, and relatively refractory POC is transported to the ocean interior in low-latitude areas.

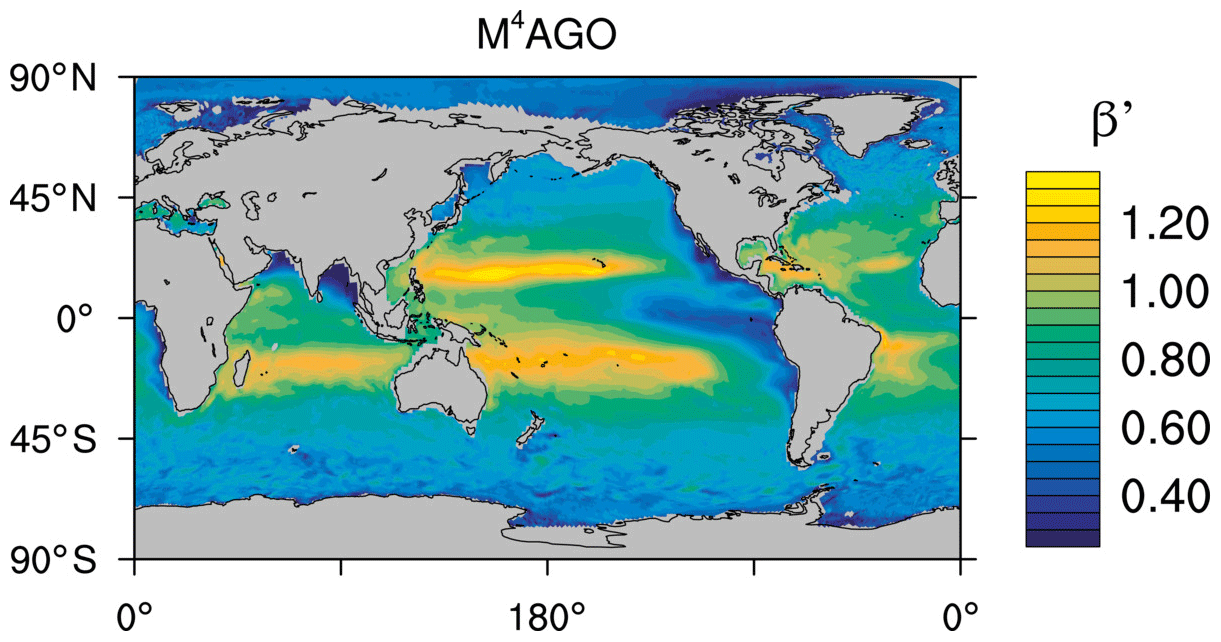
Effective Martin curve slope for POC (according to a global biogeochemical model called M^{4}AGO)

On the basis of observations that revealed a large increase of POC fluxes in high-latitude areas during diatom blooms and on the fact that diatoms are much bigger than coccolithophores, Honda and Watanabe proposed in 2010 that opal, rather than CaCO_{3}, is crucial as ballast for effective POC vertical transport in subarctic regions. Weber et al. reported in 2016 a strong negative correlation between transfer efficiency and the picoplankton fraction of plankton as well as higher transfer efficiencies in high-latitude areas, where large phytoplankton such as diatoms predominate. They also calculated that the fraction of vertically transported CO_{2} that has been sequestered in the ocean interior for at least 100 years is higher in high-latitude (polar and subpolar) regions than in low-latitude regions.

In contrast, Bach et al.conducted in 2019 a mesocosm experiment to study how the plankton community structure affected sinking velocities and reported that during more productive periods the sinking velocity of aggregated particles was not necessarily higher, because the aggregated particles produced then were very fluffy; Rather, the settling velocity was higher when the phytoplankton were dominated by small cells. In 2012, Henson et al. revisited the global sediment trap data and reported the POC flux is negatively correlated with the opal export flux and uncorrelated with the CaCO_{3} export flux.

Zones in the water column

Key factors affecting the rate of biological decomposition of sinking POC in the water column are water temperature and the dissolved oxygen (DO) concentration: the lower the water temperature and the DO concentration, the slower the biological respiration rate and, consequently, the POC flux decomposition rate. For example, in 2015 Marsay with other analysed POC flux data from neutrally buoyant sediment traps in the upper 500 m of the water column and found a significant positive correlation between the exponent b in equation (1) above and water temperature (i.e., the POC flux was attenuated more rapidly when the water was warmer). In addition, Bach et al. found POC decomposition rates are high (low) when diatoms and Synechococcus (harmful algae) are the dominant phytoplankton because of increased (decreased) zooplankton abundance and the consequent increase (decrease) in grazing pressure.

Using radiochemical observations (234Th-based POC flux observations), Pavia et al. found in 2019 that the exponent b of the Martin curve was significantly smaller in the low-oxygen (hypoxic) eastern Pacific equatorial zone than in other areas; that is, vertical attenuation of the POC flux was smaller in the hypoxic area. They pointed out that a more hypoxic ocean in the future would lead to a lower attenuation of the POC flux and therefore increased BCP efficiency and could thereby be a negative feedback on global warming. McDonnell et al. reported in 2015 that vertical transport of POC is more effective in the Antarctic, where the sinking velocity is higher and the biological respiration rate is lower than in the subtropical Atlantic. Henson et al. also reported in 2019 a high export ratio during the early bloom period, when primary productivity is low, and a low export ratio during the late bloom period, when primary productivity is high. They attributed the low export ratio during the late bloom to grazing pressure by microzooplankton and bacteria.

Despite these many investigations of the BCP, the factors governing the vertical attenuation of POC flux are still under debate. Observations in subarctic regions have shown that the transfer efficiency between depths of 1000 and 2000 m is relatively low and that between the bottom of the euphotic zone and a depth of 1000 m it is relatively high. Marsay et al. therefore proposed in 2015 that the Martin curve does not appropriately express the vertical attenuation of POC flux in all regions and that a different equation should instead be developed for each region. Gloege et al. discussed in 2017 parameterization of the vertical attenuation of POC flux, and reported that vertical attenuation of the POC flux in the twilight zone (from the base of the euphotic zone to 1000 m) can be parameterised well not only by a power law model (Martin curve) but also by an exponential model and a ballast model.

However, the exponential model tends to underestimate the POC flux in the midnight zone (depths greater than 1000 metres). Cael and Bisson reported in 2018 that the exponential model (power law model) tends to underestimate the POC flux in the upper layer, and overestimate it in the deep layer. However, the abilities of both models to describe POC fluxes were comparable statistically when they were applied to the POC flux dataset from the eastern Pacific that was used to propose the "Martin curve". In a long-term study in the northeastern Pacific, Smith et al. observed in 2018 a sudden increase of the POC flux accompanied by an unusually high transfer efficiency; they have suggested that because the Martin curve cannot express such a sudden increase, it may sometimes underestimate BCP strength. In addition, contrary to previous findings, some studies have reported a significantly higher transfer efficiency, especially to the deep sea, in subtropical regions than in subarctic regions. This pattern may be attributable to small temperature and DO concentration differences in the deep sea between high-latitude and low-latitude regions, as well as to a higher sinking velocity in subtropical regions, where CaCO_{3} is a major component of deep-sea marine snow. Moreover, it is also possible that POC is more refractory in low-latitude areas than in high-latitude areas.

== Uncertainty in the biological pump ==
The ocean's biological pump regulates atmospheric carbon dioxide levels and climate by transferring organic carbon produced at the surface by phytoplankton to the ocean interior via marine snow, where the organic carbon is consumed and respired by marine microorganisms. This surface to deep transport is usually described by a power law relationship of sinking particle concentration with depth. Uncertainty in biological pump strength can be related to different variable values (parametric uncertainty) or the underlying equations (structural uncertainty) that describe organic matter export. In 2021, Lauderdale evaluated structural uncertainty using an ocean biogeochemistry model by systematically substituting six alternative remineralisation profiles fit to a reference power-law curve. Structural uncertainty makes a substantial contribution, about one-third in atmospheric pCO_{2} terms, to the total uncertainty of the biological pump, highlighting the importance of improving biological pump characterisation from observations and its mechanistic inclusion in climate models.

Carbon and nutrients are consumed by phytoplankton in the surface ocean during primary production, leading to a downward flux of organic matter. This "marine snow" is transformed, respired, and degraded by heterotrophic organisms in deeper waters, ultimately releasing those constituents back into dissolved inorganic form. Oceanic overturning and turbulent mixing return resource-rich deep waters back to the sunlit surface layer, sustaining global ocean productivity. The biological pump maintains this vertical gradient in nutrients through uptake, vertical transport, and remineralisation of organic matter, storing carbon in the deep ocean that is isolated from the atmosphere on centennial and millennial timescales, lowering atmospheric CO_{2} levels by several hundred microatmospheres. The biological pump resists simple mechanistic characterisation due to the complex suite of biological, chemical, and physical processes involved, so the fate of exported organic carbon is typically described using a depth-dependent profile to evaluate the degradation of sinking particulate matter.

== See also ==
- Particulate inorganic carbon
