= John Martin (oceanographer) =

American oceanographer (1935–1993)

John Holland Martin (February 27, 1935 – June 18, 1993), was an American oceanographer, known for his research work at the Moss Landing Marine Laboratories.

== Life and career ==
Born in Old Lyme, Connecticut, he is known for his research on the role of iron as a phytoplankton micronutrient, and its significance for so-called "High-Nutrient, Low Chlorophyll" regions of the oceans. He further advocated the use of iron fertilization to enhance oceanic primary production and act as a sink for fossil fuel carbon dioxide. He is also known for the Martin curve, a power law which is widely used by oceanographers to describe the export to the ocean floor of particulate organic carbon (POC).

John Martin died from prostate cancer at the age of 58.

== Quotes ==
“Give me a half tanker of iron, and I will give you an ice age.” - John Martin, from a lecture at Woods Hole Oceanographic Institution.

== See also ==
- Moss Landing Marine Laboratories
