= Moss Landing Marine Laboratories =

Multi-campus marine research consortium of the California State University System

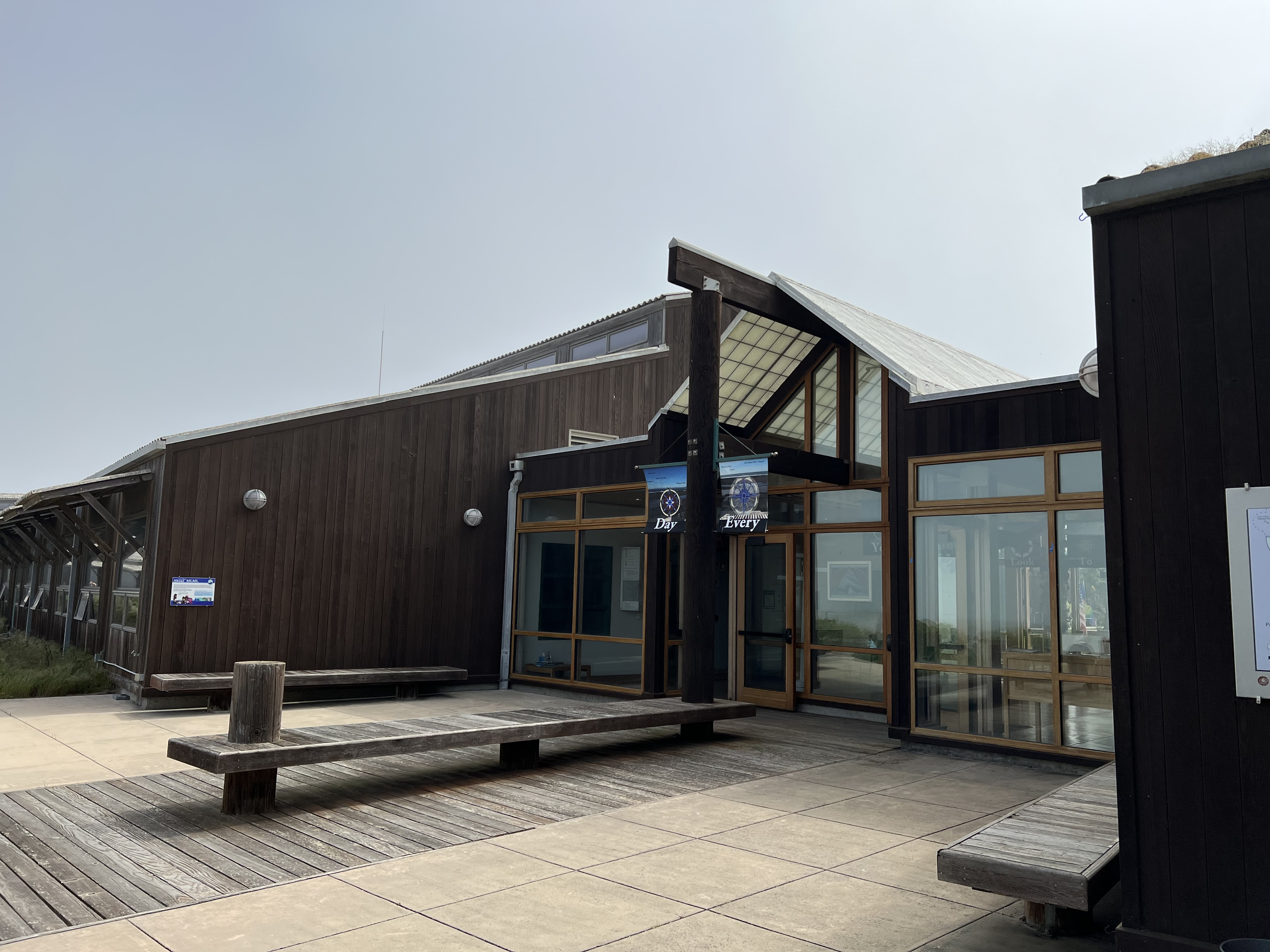
- MLML main entrance
- Type: Public
- Established: 1966
- Affiliations: California State University system; Sea grant colleges
- Location: Moss Landing, California, USA
- Campus: Rural
- Website: mlml.sjsu.edu

The Moss Landing Marine Laboratories (MLML) is a multi-campus marine research consortium of the California State University System, headquartered at Moss Landing, California.

== Organization ==
Moss Landing Marine Laboratories is part of the California State University, administered by San Jose State University (SJSU), and located in Moss Landing, California. The main building is located at 8272 Moss Landing Road, 36.79441°N 121.78762°W. It was established in 1966. At the midpoint of the coast of Monterey Bay, it is only a few hundred meters from Monterey Canyon, the largest undersea canyon on the west coast of the Americas.

The facility is a sea grant college which offers a Master of Science degree in marine sciences through the seven universities that make up the consortium, as well as graduate and undergraduate marine science courses for students on the campuses.

The seven members of the Moss Landing Marine Laboratories consortium are:

- California State University, East Bay
- California State University, Fresno
- California State University, Monterey Bay
- California State University, Sacramento
- San Francisco State University
- San Jose State University
- California State University, Stanislaus

Researchers at Moss Landing Marine Laboratories also collaborate with scientists at other institutions to analyse marine chemistry and marine species. One frequent partner in such collaborations is the Marine Mammal Center.

=== Research vessels ===
MLML operates two vessels, the 56-foot (17 m) R/V John H. Martin, and the 30-foot (9.1 m) R/V Sheila B.

=== Sea Grant ===
Moss Landing Marine Laboratories participates in the Sea Grant Colleges program by hosting an office of the UC Sea Grant Extension Program, affiliated with the University of California, San Diego.

=== Projects ===
The Submersible Capable of Under Ice Navigation and Imaging was a National Science Foundation funded research project for robotic undersea ice surveying and exploration in Antarctica from 2007 through 2009.

The Vertical Transport and Exchange of Ocean Particulate program (VERTEX) was initiated by Moss Landing Marine Labs in 1981 under the supervision of Dr. John Martin. This project resulted in the development of the iron fertilization theory (then known as the iron hypothesis), which contends that iron is a limiting factor for phytoplankton production in high-nutrient low-chlorophyll (HNLC) zones. Martin was dubbed the "Iron Man" for his role in this discovery.

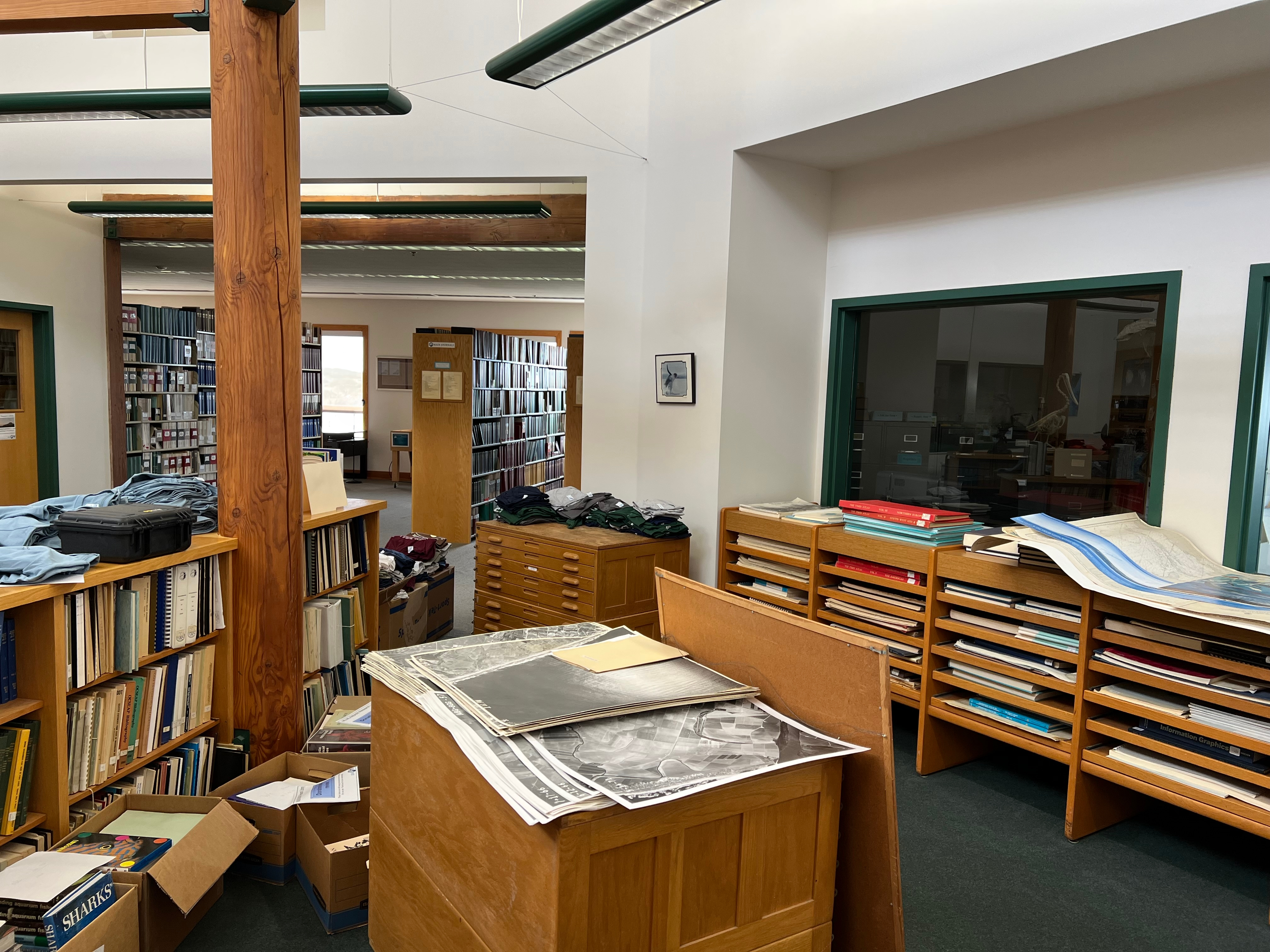
MLML library

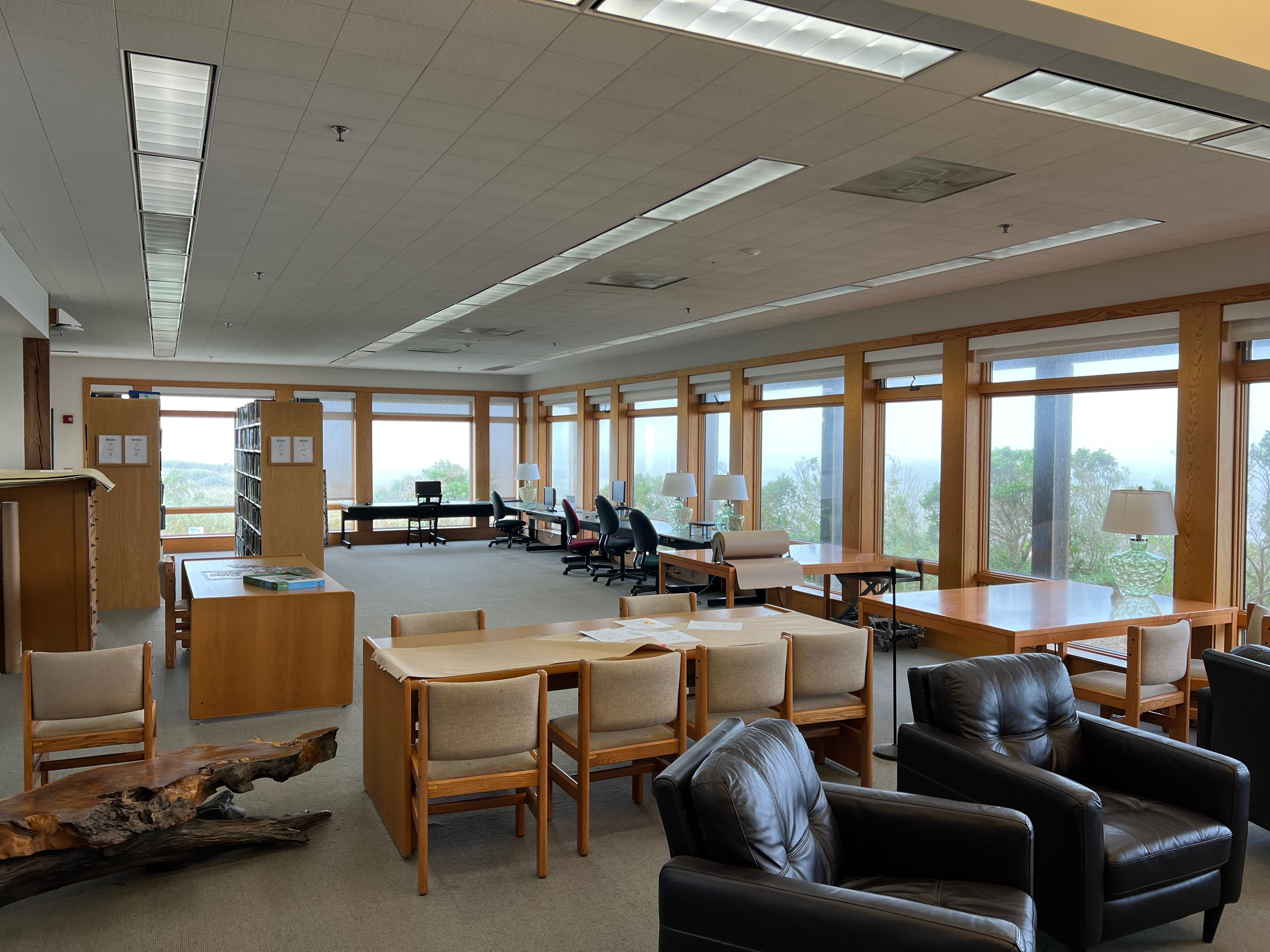
Study area

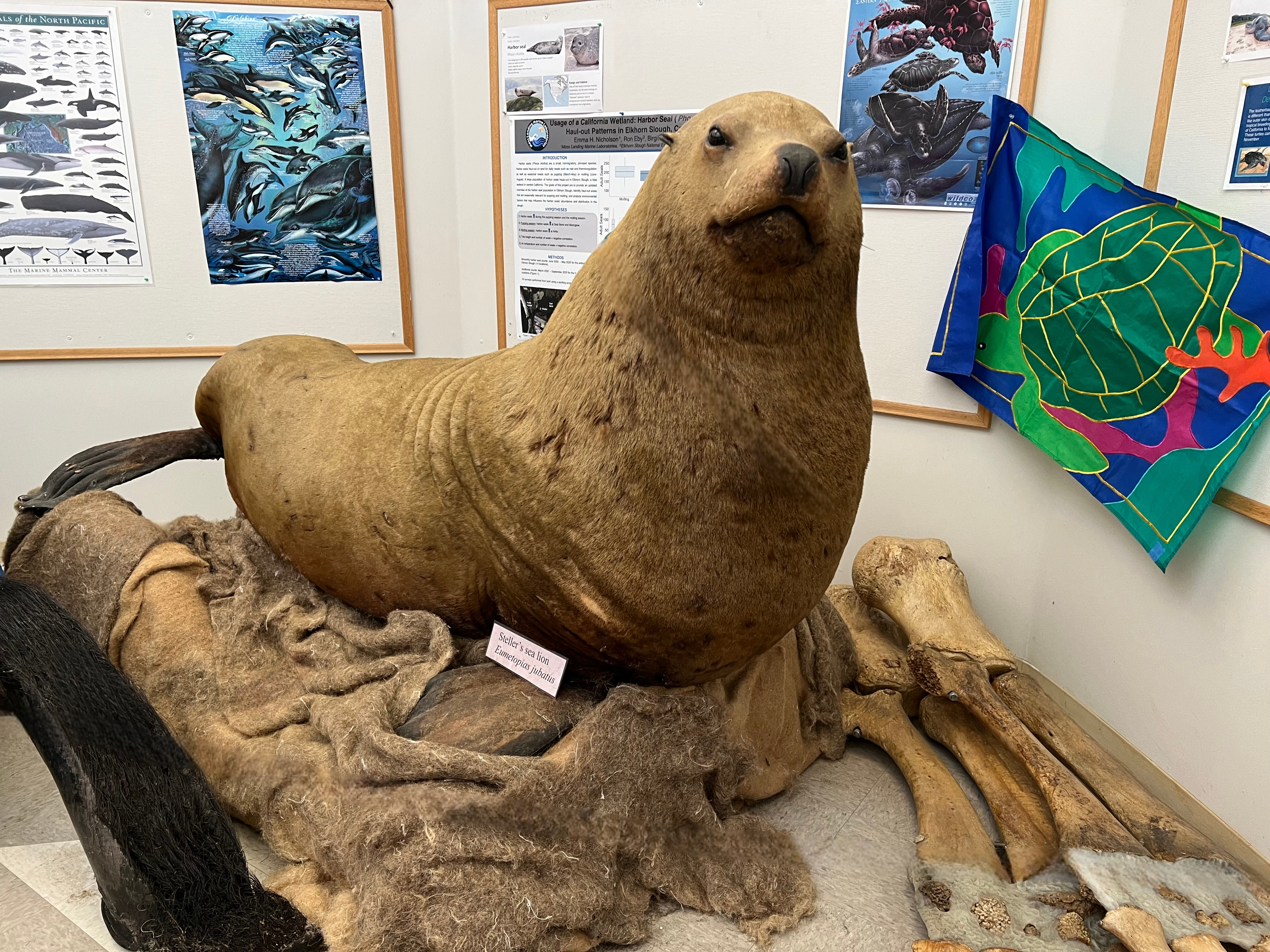
Steller's sea lion - Eumetopias jubatus

== See also ==
- Alliance for Coastal Technologies
- Hatfield Marine Science Center, a research facility associated with the Oregon State University and located in Newport, Oregon
- Hopkins Marine Station, a research facility run by Stanford University in Monterey, California
- John Martin (oceanographer)
- Marine Mammal Center
- Monterey Bay Aquarium Research Institute
- Scripps Institution of Oceanography, a research facility associated with the University of California, San Diego and located in La Jolla, California
- Southern California Marine Institute
- Woods Hole Oceanographic Institution, a research facility located in Woods Hole, Massachusetts
