= New production =

Marine biological processes using nutrients from outside the euphotic zone

In biological oceanography, new production is supported by nutrient inputs from outside the euphotic zone, especially upwelling of nutrients from deep water, but also from terrestrial and atmospheric sources (as opposed to regenerated production, which is supported by recycling of nutrients in the euphotic zone). New production depends on mixing and vertical advective processes associated with the circulation.

== New and regenerated production ==
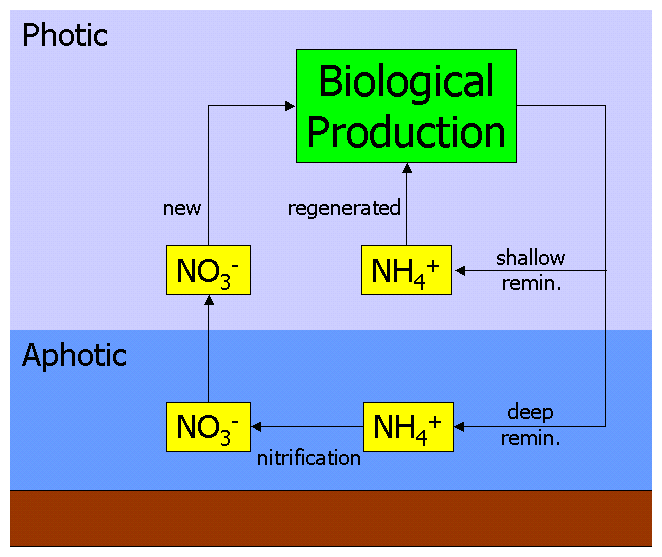
Figure: new and regenerated production

Bio-available nitrogen occurs in the ocean in several forms, including simple ionic forms such as nitrate (NO_{3}^{−}), nitrite (NO_{2}^{−}) and ammonium (NH_{4}^{+}), and more complex organic forms such as urea ((NH2)_{2}CO). These forms are utilised by autotrophic phytoplankton to synthesise organic molecules such as amino acids (the building blocks of proteins). Grazing of phytoplankton by zooplankton and larger organisms transfers this organic nitrogen up the food chain and throughout the marine food-web.

When nitrogenous organic molecules are ultimately metabolised by organisms, they are returned to the water column as ammonium (or more complex molecules that are then metabolised to ammonium). This is known as regeneration, since the ammonium can be used by phytoplankton, and again enter the food-web. Primary production fuelled by ammonium in this way is thus referred to as regenerated production.

However, ammonium can also be oxidised to nitrate (via nitrite), by the process of nitrification. This is performed by different bacteria in two stages :

NH_{3} + O_{2} → NO_{2}^{−} + 3H^{+} + 2e^{−}

NO_{2}^{−} + H_{2}O → NO_{3}^{−} + 2H^{+} + 2e^{−}

Crucially, this process is believed to only occur in the absence of light (or as some other function of depth). In the ocean, this leads to a vertical separation of nitrification from primary production, and confines it to the aphotic zone. This leads to the situation whereby any nitrate in the water column must be from the aphotic zone, and must have originated from organic material transported there by sinking. Primary production fuelled by nitrate is, therefore, making use of a "fresh" nutrient source rather than a regenerated one. Production by nitrate is thus referred to as new production.

To sum up, production based on nitrate is using nutrient molecules newly arrived from outside the productive layer is termed new production. The rate of nitrate utilization remains a good measure of the new production. While if the organic matter is then eaten, respired and the nitrogen excreted as ammonia, its subsequent uptake and re-incorporation in organic matter by phytoplankton is termed recycled (or regenerated) production. The rate of ammonia utilization is, in the same sense, a measure of recycled production.

The use of ^{15}N-compounds makes it possible to measure the fractions of new nitrogen and regenerated nitrogen associated with the primary production in the sea.

== See also ==
- f-ratio
- Primary production
