= Seston =

Organisms and non-living matter swimming or floating in a water body

Seston (from Ancient Greek: σηστόν, romanized: sēstón, lit. 'that which is sifted') refers to the particles suspended in bodies of water, such as oceans, lakes, and rivers. Small particles of seston may be formed by the breaking down of larger particles amidst the crashing of waves, mixing of water currents, or slow disintegration. The organic constituents of seston include plankton and detritus from decomposing organisms; the inorganic components of seston are of mineral origin, essentially particles of mud suspended in the water column.

Seston is used by many species in their day-to-day activities. Some examples are barnacles, mussels, scallops, corals, sea anemones, sea squirts, and sea cucumbers. Suspension feeders and filter feeders like whales also rely on seston as a food source. Nutrient-rich seston particles can support the local ecosystem by providing nutrition to organisms. The higher the amount of organic matter in the seston, the more nutritious it is for the suspension feeders who count on seston as a food source. Many of these animals have adapted to be able to eat both organic and inorganic seston. Animals that eat seston also have to adapt because the seston is not always present or may have periods of time when it is less nutritious. They adapt by eating more when it is there or by storing it to eat later when it would otherwise be unavailable. Studies of rivers have shown that downstream seston is more nutritious than it is upstream.

While seston is necessary for many animals and in many ecosystems, it can also be harmful in large quantities. Sometimes human activities like fishing and farming that generate nutrient-rich surface runoff can make the presence of organic seston increase dramatically. This sudden increase can destabilize the ecosystem if there are not enough organisms that eat that seston to make up for the increase. As the amount of seston grows, it may undermine the growth of other organisms, a process known as cultural eutrophication. One example of this process Lake Okeechobee in the U.S. state of Florida. Runoff from nearby farming increases the nutrients in the lake and causes the amount of algae to grow. Especially in the more shallow parts of Lake Okeechobee, the algae grows very well because it requires sunlight to carry out the process of photosynthesis to make food for itself. Because parts of Lake Okeechobee are so shallow, there is a high degree of light penetration through the water, which allows more of the algae to receive the sunlight it needs. Because the algae needs a warm and sunny environment, this is especially a problem in warmer climates like that of Florida. Some of the algae bloom is blue-green algae, which is also known as cyanobacteria. It grows very quickly when it has nutrition from nitrogen and phosphorus. The algae bloom decreases water quality and can make people and animals sick. Some symptoms in people include nausea and vomiting, but the worst side effect could be liver failure. Since Lake Okeechobee waters are released to the ocean through canals to the east and west, coastal areas in Florida are affected too. The algae bloom has caused businesses near the ocean to close and hurt tourism revenues in recent years. Florida has even declared a state of emergency in the past because of the algae bloom.

== See also ==
- Aquatic animal
- Aquatic ecosystem
- Marine snow
