= Marine snow =

Shower of organic detritus in the ocean

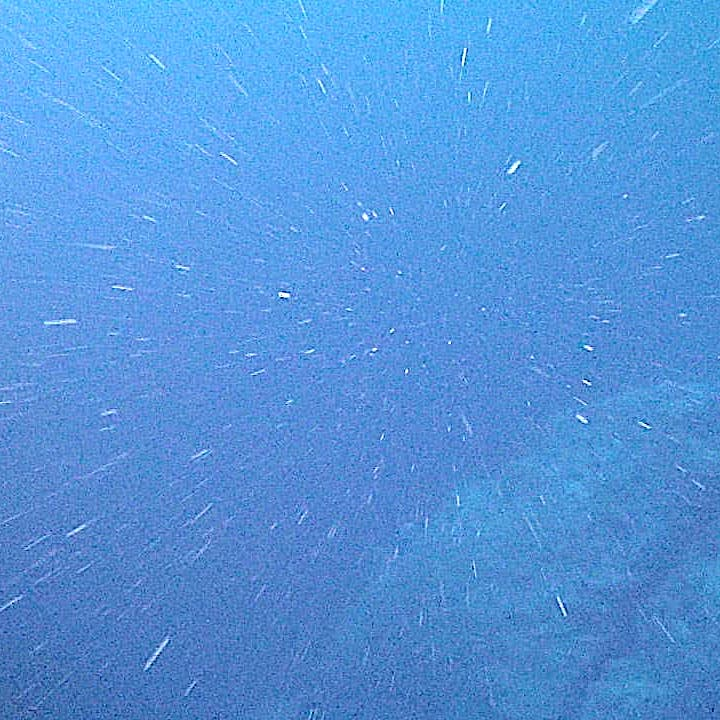
Marine snow is a shower of organic material falling from upper waters to the deep ocean.

In the deep ocean, marine snow is a continuous shower of mostly organic detritus falling from the upper layers of the water column. It is a significant means of exporting energy from the light-rich photic zone to the aphotic zone below, which is referred to as the biological pump. Export production is the amount of organic matter produced in the ocean by primary production that is not recycled (remineralised) before it sinks into the aphotic zone. Because of the role of export production in the ocean's biological pump, it is typically measured in units of carbon (e.g. mg C m^{−2} d^{−1}). The term was coined by explorer William Beebe as observed from his bathysphere. As the origin of marine snow lies in activities within the productive photic zone, the prevalence of marine snow changes with seasonal fluctuations in photosynthetic activity and ocean currents. Marine snow can be an important food source for organisms living in the aphotic zone, particularly for organisms that live very deep in the water column.

== Composition ==
Marine snow is made up of a variety of mostly organic matter, including dead or dying animals and phytoplankton, protists, fecal matter, sand, and other inorganic dust. Most trapped particles are more vulnerable to grazers than they would be as free-floating individuals. Aggregates can form through abiotic processes (i.e. extrapolymeric substances). These are natural polymers exuded as waste products mostly by phytoplankton and bacteria. Mucus secreted by zooplankton (mostly salps, appendicularians, and pteropods) also contributes to the constituents of marine snow aggregates. These aggregates grow over time and may reach several centimeters in diameter, traveling for weeks before reaching the ocean floor.

Marine snow often forms during algal blooms. As phytoplankton accumulate, they aggregate or get captured in other aggregates, both of which accelerate the sinking rate. Aggregation and sinking is actually thought to be a large component of sources for algae loss from surface water. Most organic components of marine snow are consumed by microbes, zooplankton and other filter-feeding animals within the first 1,000 metres (3,300 ft) of their journey. In this way marine snow may be considered the foundation of deep-sea mesopelagic and benthic ecosystems: As sunlight cannot reach them, deep-sea organisms rely heavily on marine snow as an energy source. The small percentage of material not consumed in shallower waters becomes incorporated into the muddy "ooze" blanketing the ocean floor, where it is further decomposed through biological activity.

Marine snow aggregates exhibit characteristics that fit Goldman's "aggregate spinning wheel hypothesis". This hypothesis states that phytoplankton, microorganisms and bacteria live attached to aggregate surfaces and are involved in rapid nutrient recycling. Phytoplankton have been shown to be able to take up nutrients from small local concentrations of organic material (e.g. fecal matter from an individual zooplankton cell, regenerated nutrients from organic decomposition by bacteria). As the aggregates slowly sink to the bottom of the ocean, the many microorganisms residing on them are constantly respiring and contribute greatly to the microbial loop.

== Aggregate dynamics ==
Aggregates begin as the colloidal fraction, which typically contains particles sized between one nanometer and several micrometers. The colloidal fraction of the ocean contains a large amount of organic matter unavailable to grazers. This fraction has a much higher total mass than either phytoplankton or bacteria but is not readily available due to size characteristics of the particles in relation to potential consumers. The colloidal fraction must aggregate in order to be more bioavailable.

=== Ballasting effect ===
Aggregates that sink more quickly to the bottom of the ocean have a greater chance of exporting carbon to the deep sea floor. The longer the residence time in the water column the greater the chance of being grazed upon. Aggregates formed in high dust areas are able to increase their densities faster and in more superficial layers compared to aggregates formed without dust particles present and these aggregates with increased lithogenic material have also been correlated with particulate organic carbon fluxes, however when they become heavily ballasted with lithogenic material they cannot scavenge any additional minerals during their descent, which suggests that carbon export to the deep ocean in regions with high dust deposition is strongly controlled by dust input to the surface ocean while suspended dust particles in deeper water layers do not significantly interact with sinking aggregates.

=== Fragmentation ===
Once particles have aggregated to several micrometers in diameter, they begin to accumulate bacteria, since there is sufficient site space for feeding and reproduction. At this size, it is large enough to undergo sinking. It also has the components necessary to fit the "aggregate spinning wheel hypothesis". Evidence for this has been found by Alldredge and Cohen (1987) who found evidence of both respiration and photosynthesis within aggregates, suggesting the presence of both autotrophic and heterotrophic organisms. During zooplankton's vertical migration, the abundances of aggregates increased while size distributions decreased. Aggregates were found in the abdomen in zooplankton indicating their grazing will fragment larger aggregates.

=== Surface coagulation ===
Aggregates may also form from colloids trapped on the surface of rising bubbles. For example, Kepkay et al. found that bubble coagulation leads to an increase in bacterial respiration since more food is available to them.

=== Filtration ===
Particles and small organisms floating through the water column can become trapped within aggregates. Marine snow aggregates are porous, however, and some particles are able to pass through them.

== Particle-associated microorganisms ==
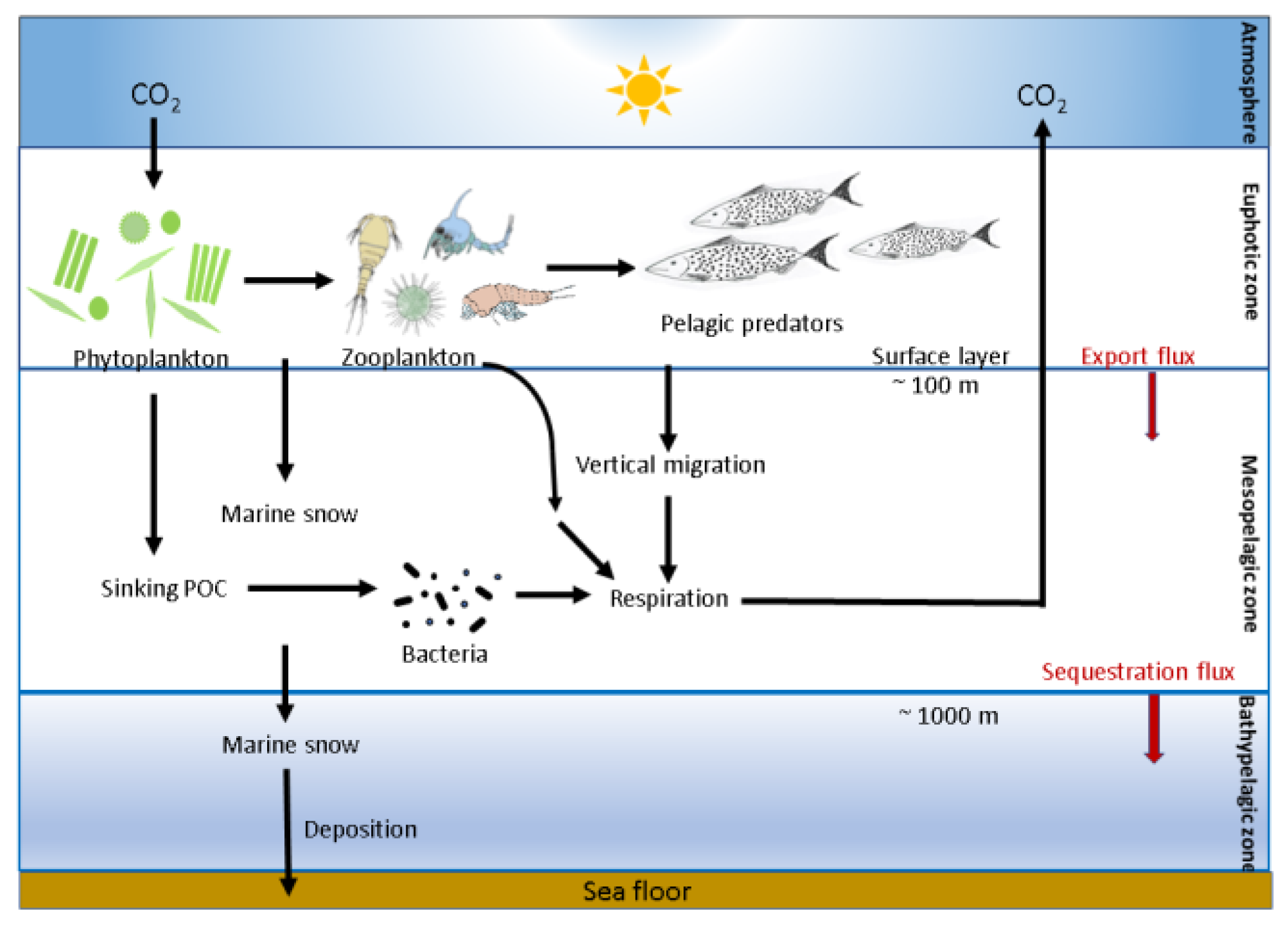
Central role of marine snow in the ocean carbon pump

Planktonic prokaryotes are further defined into two categories, free-living or particle associated. The two are separated by filtration. Particle-associated bacteria are often difficult to study because marine snow aggregates are often ranging in sizes from 0.2 to 200 μm, often rendering sampling efforts difficult. These aggregates are hotspots for microbial activity. Marine bacteria are the most abundant organisms in aggregates followed by cyanobacteria and then nanoflagellates. Aggregates can be enriched about one thousand times more than the surrounding seawater. Seasonal variability can also have an effect on microbial communities of marine snow aggregates with concentrations being the highest during the summer.

As illustrated in the diagram, phytoplankton fix carbon dioxide in the euphotic zone using solar energy and produce particulate organic carbon. The particulate organic carbon formed in the euphotic zone is processed by marine microorganisms (microbes), zooplankton and their consumers into organic aggregates (marine snow), which is then exported to the mesopelagic (200–1,000 m (660–3,280 ft) depth) and bathypelagic zones by sinking and vertical migration by zooplankton and fish.

Export flux is defined as the sedimentation out of the surface layer (at approximately 100 m (330 ft) depth) and sequestration flux is the sedimentation out of the mesopelagic zone (at approximately 1000 m depth). A portion of the particulate organic carbon is respired back to CO_{2} in the oceanic water column at depth, mostly by heterotrophic microbes and zooplankton, thus maintaining a vertical gradient in concentration of dissolved inorganic carbon (DIC). This deep-ocean DIC returns to the atmosphere on millennial timescales through thermohaline circulation. Between 1% and 40% of the primary production is exported out of the euphotic zone, which attenuates exponentially towards the base of the mesopelagic zone and only about 1% of the surface production reaches the sea floor.

The largest component of biomass are marine protists (eukaryotic microorganisms). Marine snow aggregates collected from the bathypelagic zone were found to consist largely of fungi and labyrinthulomycetes. Smaller aggregates do not harbor as many eukaryotic organisms which is similar to what is found in the deep ocean. The bathypelagic aggregates mostly resembled those found in the surface ocean. It implies higher rates of remineralization in the bathypelagic zone.

Numerically, the largest component of marine snow are the prokaryotes that colonize the aggregates. Bacteria are largely responsible for the remineralisation and fragmentation of aggregates. Remineralization occurs typically below 200 m (660 ft) depth.

Microbial communities that form on the aggregates vary from the communities in the water column. The concentration of attached microbes are typically orders of magnitude larger than free-living microbes. Isolated bacterial cultures have up to 20 times more enzymatic activity within 2 hours of aggregate attachment. The dark ocean harbors around 65% of all pelagic Bacteria and Archaea.

It was previously thought that due to fragmentation, bacterial communities would shift as they travel down the water column. As seen in experiments, it now appears that the communities that form during aggregation remain associated with the aggregate and any community changes are due to grazing or fragmentation rather than new bacterial colony formation.

=== Carbon cycling ===
The deep ocean harbors more than 98% of the dissolved inorganic carbon pool, along with a rapid sedimentation rate that results in low particulate organic carbon inputs. It is yet to be resolved what effect microbes have on the global carbon cycle. Studies show that microbes in the deep ocean are not dormant, but are metabolically active and must be participating in nutrient cycling by not only heterotrophs but by autotrophs as well. There is a mismatch from the microbial carbon demand in the deep ocean and the carbon export from the surface ocean. Dissolved inorganic carbon fixation is on similar orders of magnitude as heterotrophic microbes in the surface ocean. Model-based data reveal that dissolved inorganic carbon fixation ranges from 1 mmol C m^{−2} d^{−1} to 2.5 mmol C m^{−2} d^{−1}.

==== Microenvironments ====
Large aggregates can become anoxic which gives rise to anaerobic metabolisms. Typically anaerobic metabolisms are confined to areas where it is more energetically favorable. Given the abundance of denitrifying and sulfate-reducing bacteria, it is thought that these metabolisms are able to thrive within marine snow aggregates. In a model developed by Bianchi et al., it shows the various redox potentials within an aggregate.

== Implications ==
Because of the relatively long residence time of the ocean's thermohaline circulation, carbon transported as marine snow into the deep ocean by the biological pump can remain out of contact with the atmosphere for more than 1000 years. That is, when the marine snow is finally decomposed to inorganic nutrients and dissolved carbon dioxide, these are effectively isolated from the surface ocean for relatively long time scales related to ocean circulation. Consequently, enhancing the quantity of marine snow that reaches the deep ocean is the basis of several geoengineering schemes to enhance carbon sequestration by the ocean. Ocean nourishment and iron fertilisation seek to boost the production of organic material in the surface ocean, with a concomitant rise in marine snow reaching the deep ocean. These efforts have not yet produced a sustainable fertilization that effectively transports carbon out of the system.

Increases in ocean temperatures, a projected indicator of climate change, may result in a decrease in the production of marine snow due to the enhanced stratification of the water column. Increasing stratification decreases the availability of phytoplankton nutrients such as nitrate, phosphate and silicic acid, and could lead to a decrease in primary production and, thus, marine snow.

The microbial communities associated with marine snow are also interesting to microbiologists. Recent research indicates transported bacteria may exchange genes with previously thought to be isolated populations of bacteria inhabiting the breadth of the ocean floor. In such an immense area there may be as yet undiscovered species tolerant of high pressures and extreme cold, perhaps finding use in bioengineering and pharmacy.

== See also ==
- Biological pump
- Detritivore
- Diffusion-limited aggregation
- f-ratio
- Martin curve
- Particulate organic matter
- Sea snot
- Sediment trap
- Whale fall
- Vampire squid
- Seston
