= Particulate organic matter =

Non-soluble organic matter in aquatic and soil systems

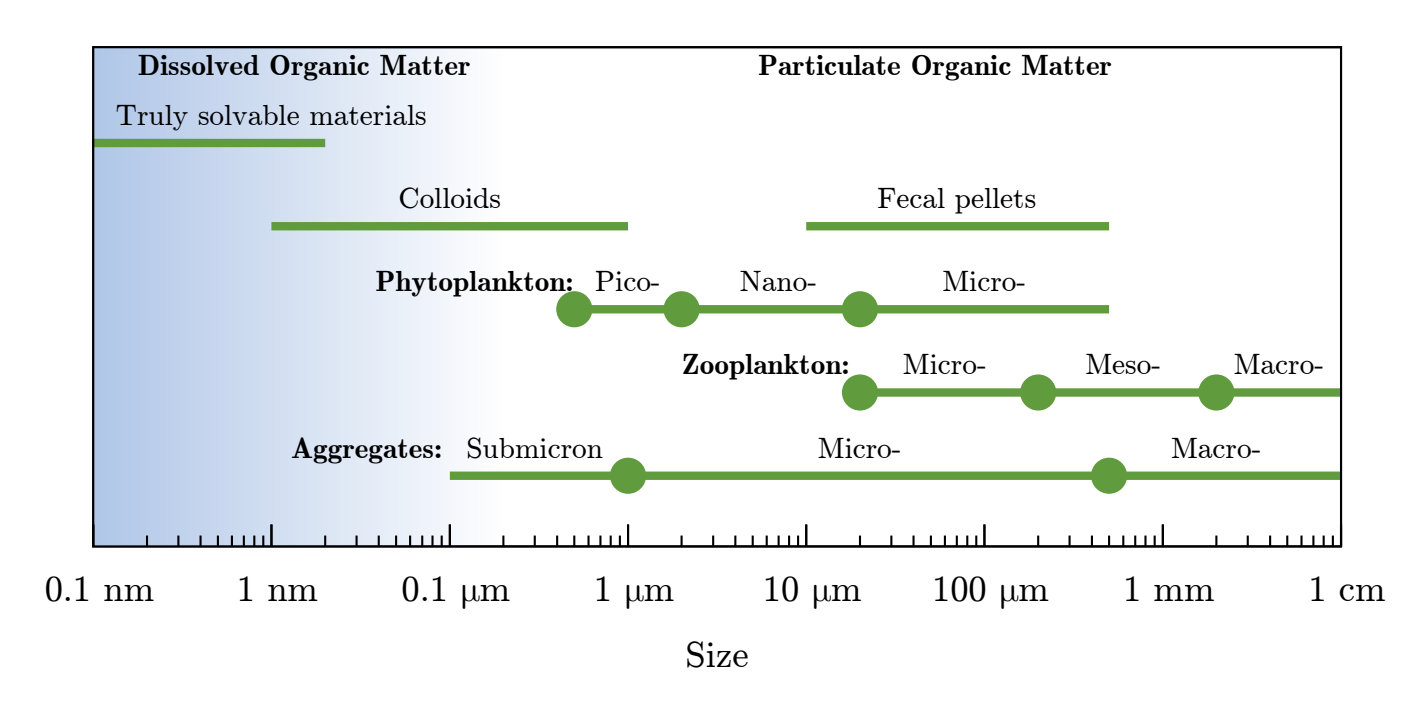
Size and classification of marine particles Adapted from Simon et al., 2002.

Particulate organic matter (POM) is a fraction of total organic matter operationally defined as that which does not pass through a filter pore size that typically ranges in size from 0.053 millimeters (53 μm) to 2 millimeters.

Particulate organic carbon (POC) is a closely related term often used interchangeably with POM. POC refers specifically to the mass of carbon in the particulate organic material, while POM refers to the total mass of the particulate organic matter. In addition to carbon, POM includes the mass of the other elements in the organic matter, such as nitrogen, oxygen and hydrogen. In this sense POC is a component of POM and there is typically about twice as much POM as POC. Many statements that can be made about POM apply equally to POC, and much of what is said in this article about POM could equally have been said of POC.

Particulate organic matter is sometimes called suspended organic matter, macroorganic matter, or coarse fraction organic matter. When land samples are isolated by sieving or filtration, this fraction includes partially decomposed detritus and plant material, pollen, and other materials. When sieving to determine POM content, consistency is crucial because isolated size fractions will depend on the force of agitation.

POM is readily decomposable, serving many soil functions and providing terrestrial material to water bodies. It is a source of food for both soil organisms and aquatic organisms and provides nutrients for plants. In water bodies, POM can contribute substantially to turbidity, limiting photic depth which can suppress primary productivity. POM also enhances soil structure leading to increased water infiltration, aeration and resistance to erosion. Soil management practices, such as tillage and compost/manure application, alter the POM content of soil and water.

== Overview ==
Particulate organic carbon (POC) is operationally defined as all combustible, non-carbonate carbon that can be collected on a filter. The oceanographic community has historically used a variety of filters and pore sizes, most commonly 0.7, 0.8, or 1.0 μm glass or quartz fiber filters. The biomass of living zooplankton is intentionally excluded from POC through the use of a pre-filter or specially designed sampling intakes that repel swimming organisms. Sub-micron particles, including most marine prokaryotes, which are 0.2–0.8 μm in diameter, are often not captured but should be considered part of POC rather than dissolved organic carbon (DOC), which is usually operationally defined as < 0.2 μm.

Typically POC is considered to contain suspended and sinking particles ≥ 0.2 μm in size, which therefore includes biomass from living microbial cells, detrital material including dead cells, fecal pellets, other aggregated material, and terrestrially derived organic matter. Some studies further divide POC operationally based on its sinking rate or size, with ≥ 51 μm particles sometimes equated to the sinking fraction. Both DOC and POC play major roles in the carbon cycle, but POC is the major pathway by which organic carbon produced by phytoplankton is exported – mainly by gravitational settling – from the surface to the deep ocean and eventually to sediments, and is thus a key component of the biological pump.

Particulate organic nitrogen (PON) can also be an important component of particulate organic matter. PON is the fraction of nitrogen found in particulate organic matter (POM) that exists in solid or suspended form, rather than dissolved in water. PON primarily originates from phytoplankton during photosynthetic growth, but it can also form from zooplankton fecal pellets, detritus, and aggregated organic debris from the breakdown of larger organisms. PON plays an important role in the marine nitrogen cycle and the biological carbon pump. When particles containing organic nitrogen sink from the surface ocean, they transport both nitrogen and carbon to deeper waters. In deep waters, microbial remineralization converts the material back into dissolved forms. This vertical flux helps sustain deep-ocean microbial communities and regulates nutrient availability in surface waters, thus influencing global productivity patterns.

PON is commonly measured by filtering seawater samples to isolate particulate matter, which is then analyzed for total nitrogen and isotopic composition. Isotopic ratios like δ^{15}N (the ratio of ^{15}N to ^{14}N) provide valuable information about nitrogen sources and biogeochemical transformations. Low δ^{15}N values in PON can indicate a primary contribution from nitrogen fixation, whereas higher values often reflect the assimilation of nitrate regenerated from deeper layers, as the lighter ^{14}N isotope is preferentially used in the early fixation process. Recent studies now use dual-isotope analysis. This process measures both δ^{15}N and δ^{18}O of nitrate. The data allows scientists to better understand nitrification, denitrification, and other nitrogen cycle processes. These combined measurements allow scientists to distinguish between physical mixing and microbial fractionation effects that influence nitrate and particulate nitrogen in the ocean.

By tracking PON concentrations and isotopic compositions, researchers can estimate the proportion of "new" versus "regenerated" production, evaluate the efficiency of the biological pump, and quantify how nitrogen moves through and out of marine ecosystems.

== Terrestrial ecosystems ==
=== Soil organic matter ===
Soil organic matter is anything in the soil of biological origin. Carbon is its key component comprising about 58% by weight. Simple assessment of total organic matter is obtained by measuring organic carbon in soil. Living organisms (including roots) contribute about 15% of the total organic matter in soil. These are critical to operation of the soil carbon cycle. What follows refers to the remaining 85% of the soil organic matter - the non-living component.

As shown below, non-living organic matter in soils can be grouped into four distinct categories on the basis of size, behaviour and persistence. These categories are arranged in order of decreasing ability to decompose. Each of them contribute to soil health in different ways.

- Soil organic matter (non‑living)
  - dissolved organic matter (DOM)
    relatively simple molecules
    from decomposing materials
    (< 0.45 microns)
  - particulate organic matter (POM)
    - litter of plant and
      herbivore origin
      (< 2 mm)
    - detritus
      (2 mm – 54 micron)
  - humus
    amorphous colloidal
    particles
    (< 53 microns)
  - resistant organic matter
    charcoals and
    related compounds

Dissolved organic matter (DOM): is the organic matter which dissolves in soil water. It comprises the relatively simple organic compounds (e.g. organic acids, sugars and amino acids) which easily decompose. It has a turnover time of less than 12 months. Exudates from plant roots (mucilages and gums) are included here.

Particulate organic matter (POM): is the organic matter that retains evidence of its original cellular structure, and is discussed further in the next section.

Humus: is usually the largest proportion of organic matter in soil, contributing 45 to 75%. Typically it adheres to soil minerals, and plays an important role structuring soil. Humus is the end product of soil organism activity, is chemically complex, and does not have recognisable characteristics of its origin. Humus is of very small unit size and has large surface area in relation to its weight. It holds nutrients, has high water holding capacity and significant cation exchange capacity, buffers pH change and can hold cations. Humus is quite slow to decompose and exists in soil for decades.

Resistant organic matter: has a high carbon content and includes charcoal, charred plant materials, graphite and coal. Turnover times are long and estimated in hundreds of years. It is not biologically active but contributes positively to soil structural properties, including water holding capacity, cation exchange capacity and thermal properties.

=== Role of POM in soils ===
Particulate organic matter (POM) includes steadily decomposing plant litter and animal faeces, and the detritus from the activity of microorganisms. Most of it continually undergoes decomposition by microorganisms (when conditions are sufficiently moist) and usually has a turnover time of less than 10 years. Less active parts may take 15 to 100 years to turnover. Where it is still at the soil surface and relatively fresh, particulate organic matter intercepts the energy of raindrops and protects physical soil surfaces from damage. As it is decomposes, particulate organic matter provides much of the energy required by soil organisms as well as providing a steady release of nutrients into the soil environment.

The decomposition of POM provides energy and nutrients. Nutrients not taken up by soil organisms may be available for plant uptake. The amount of nutrients released (mineralized) during decomposition depends on the biological and chemical characteristics of the POM, such as the C:N ratio. In addition to nutrient release, decomposers colonizing POM play a role in improving soil structure. Fungal mycelium entangle soil particles and release sticky, cement-like, polysaccharides into the soil; ultimately forming soil aggregates

Soil POM content is affected by organic inputs and the activity of soil decomposers. The addition of organic materials, such as manure or crop residues, typically results in an increase in POM. Alternatively, repeated tillage or soil disturbance increases the rate of decomposition by exposing soil organisms to oxygen and organic substrates; ultimately, depleting POM. Reduction in POM content is observed when native grasslands are converted to agricultural land. Soil temperature and moisture also affect the rate of POM decomposition. Because POM is a readily available (labile) source of soil nutrients, is a contributor to soil structure, and is highly sensitive to soil management, it is frequently used as an indicator to measure soil quality.

=== Freshwater ecosystems ===
In poorly managed soils, particularly on sloped ground, erosion and transport of soil sediment rich in POM can contaminate water bodies. Because POM provides a source of energy and nutrients, rapid build-up of organic matter in water can result in eutrophication. Suspended organic materials can also serve as a potential vector for the pollution of water with fecal bacteria, toxic metals or organic compounds.

=== Effect on sewage and its systems ===
In sewage systems, POC (mainly derived from carbon particulates) tend to affect the viscosity and toxicity levels of the sewage material in modern sewage systems. This has a destructive effect on the sewage infrastructure in major cities as well by causing build up and increasing the rate of corrosion. This also increases the viscosity of the sewage turning it into a 'sewage sludge'.

== Marine ecosystems ==
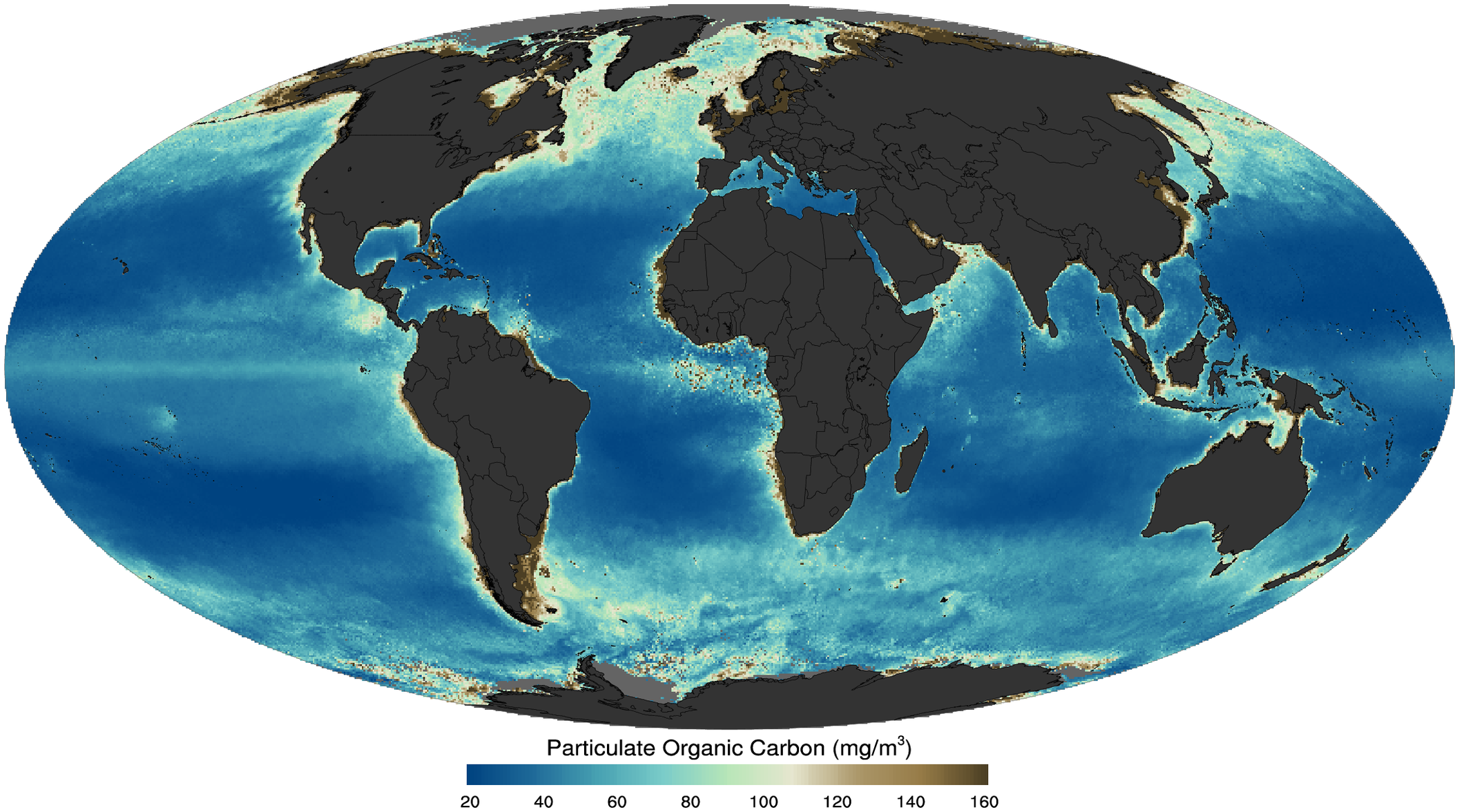
Ocean particulate organic matter (POM) as imaged by satellite in 2011

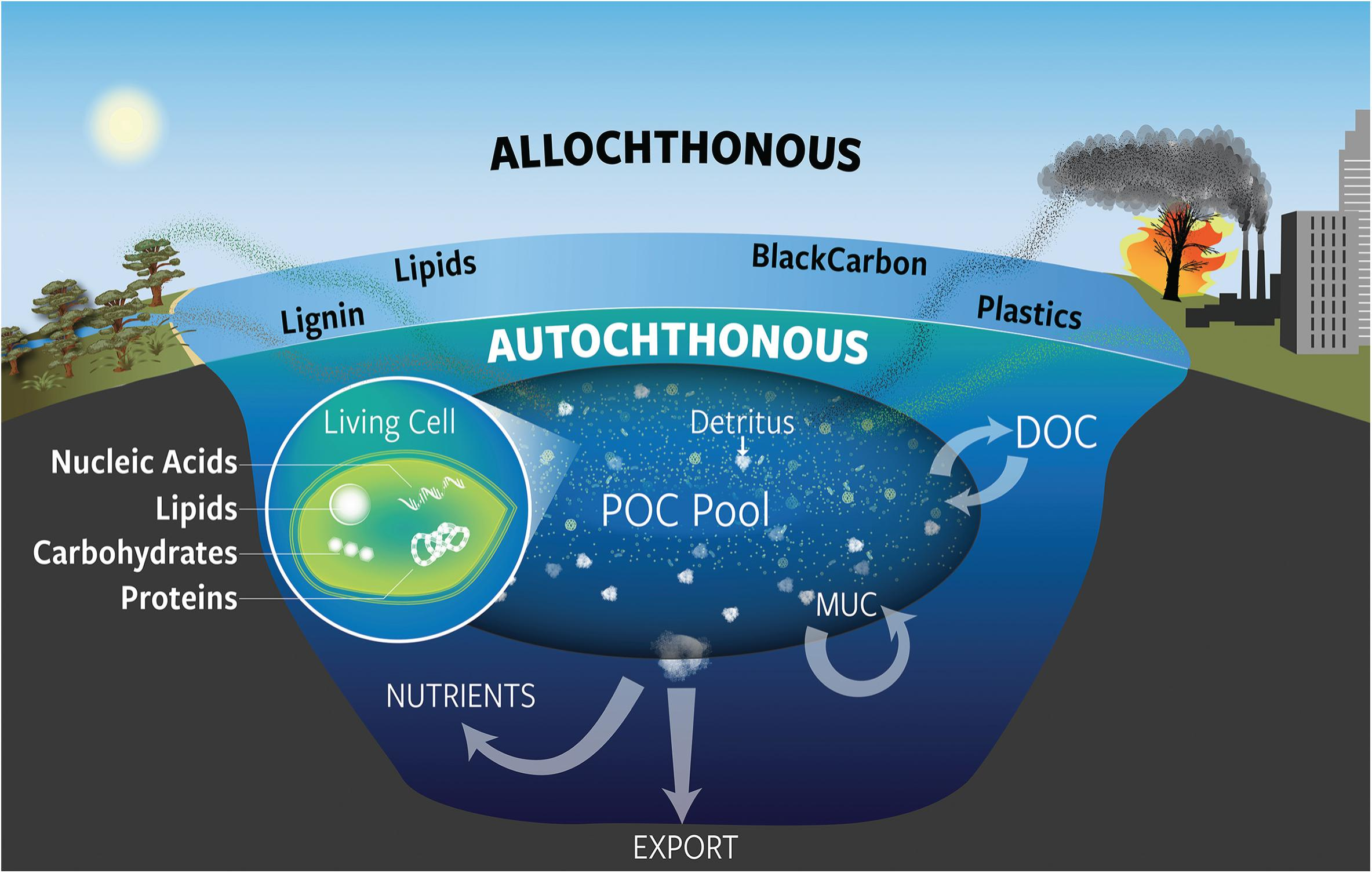
Marine particulate organic carbon (POC) POC includes components of living cells as well as dead material (detritus), and originates from both allochthonous and autochthonous sources. The POC pool can also exchange material with the dissolved OC (DOC) pool through aggregation and disaggregation of particles. This process and others may be involved in the formation of the molecularly uncharacterized component (MUC), which may incorporate both autochthonous and allochthonous OC.

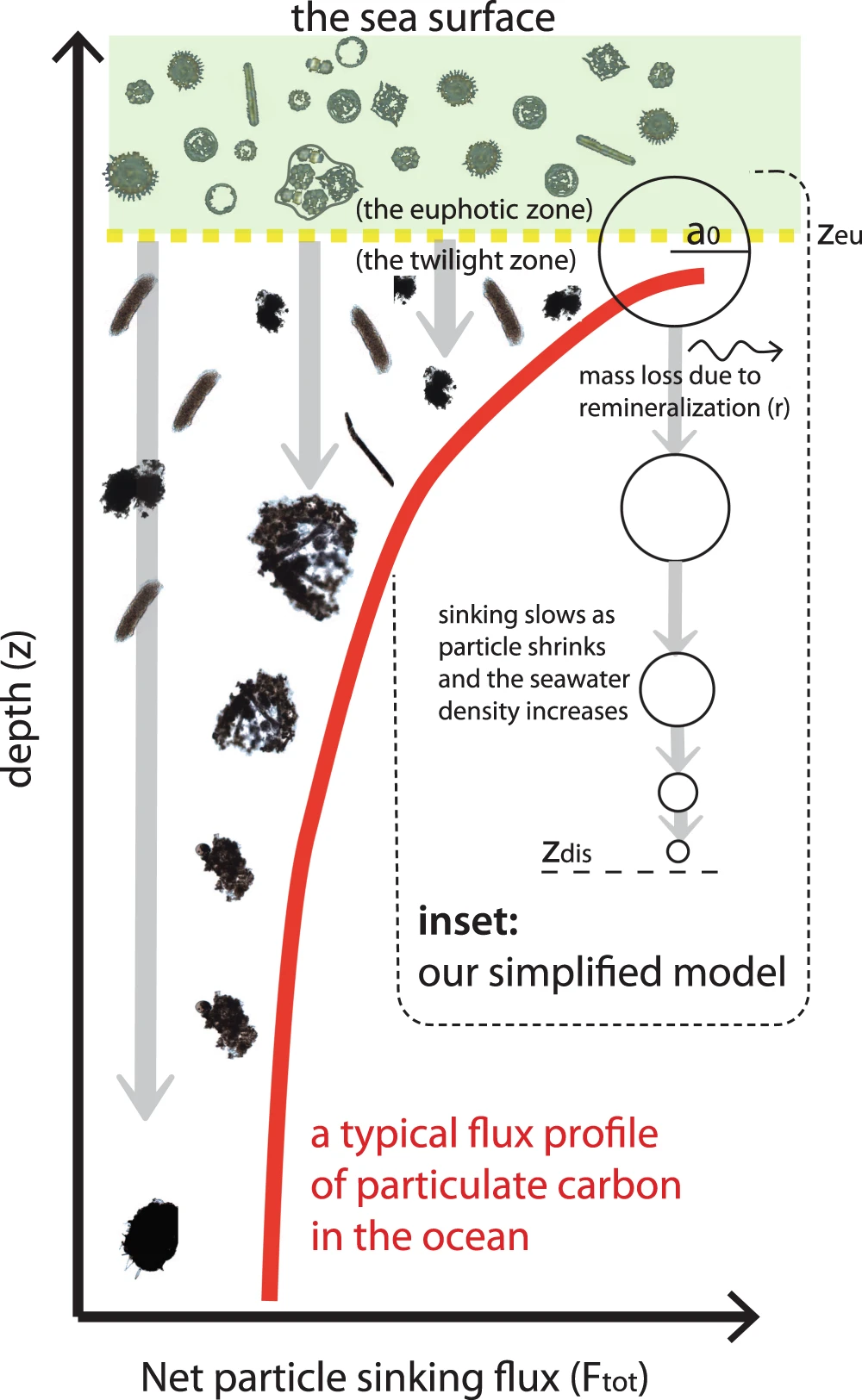
Model of sinking oceanic particles In the simplified model, shown in the inset, the spheres represent either solid particles or aggregates. These particles (initial radius a_{0}) produced within the sunlit euphotic zone (green region extending to z_{eu}) sink at a rate predicted by Stokes' law. They slow as they reach greater depths due to their shrinking volume and increasing water density and would entirely disappear at z_{dis}.

Life and particulate organic matter in the ocean have fundamentally shaped the planet. On the most basic level, particulate organic matter can be defined as both living and non-living matter of biological origin with a size of ≥0.2 μm in diameter, including anything from a small bacterium (0.2 μm in size) to blue whales (20 m in size). Organic matter plays a crucial role in regulating global marine biogeochemical cycles and events, from the Great Oxidation Event in Earth's early history to the sequestration of atmospheric carbon dioxide in the deep ocean. Understanding the distribution, characteristics, dynamics, and changes over time of particulate matter in the ocean is hence fundamental in understanding and predicting the marine ecosystem, from food web dynamics to global biogeochemical cycles.

=== Measuring POM ===
Optical particle measurements are emerging as an important technique for understanding the ocean carbon cycle, including contributions to estimates of their downward flux, which sequesters carbon dioxide in the deep sea. Optical instruments can be used from ships or installed on autonomous platforms, delivering much greater spatial and temporal coverage of particles in the mesopelagic zone of the ocean than traditional techniques, such as sediment traps. Technologies to image particles have advanced greatly over the last two decades, but the quantitative translation of these immense datasets into biogeochemical properties remains a challenge. In particular, advances are needed to enable the optimal translation of imaged objects into carbon content and sinking velocities. In addition, different devices often measure different optical properties, leading to difficulties in comparing results.

=== Ocean primary production ===
Marine primary production can be divided into new production from allochthonous nutrient inputs to the euphotic zone, and regenerated production from nutrient recycling in the surface waters. The total new production in the ocean roughly equates to the sinking flux of particulate organic matter to the deep ocean, about 4 billion tons of carbon annually.

=== Model of sinking oceanic particles ===
Sinking oceanic particles encompass a wide range of shape, porosity, ballast and other characteristics. The model shown in the diagram at the right attempts to capture some of the predominant features that influence the shape of the sinking flux profile (red line). The sinking of organic particles produced in the upper sunlit layers of the ocean forms an important limb of the oceanic biological pump, which impacts the sequestration of carbon and resupply of nutrients in the mesopelagic ocean. Particles raining out from the upper ocean undergo remineralization by bacteria colonized on their surface and interior, leading to an attenuation in the sinking flux of organic matter with depth. The diagram illustrates a mechanistic model for the depth-dependent, sinking, particulate mass flux constituted by a range of sinking, remineralizing particles.

Marine snow varies in shape, size and character, ranging from individual cells to pellets and aggregates, most of which is rapidly colonized and consumed by heterotrophic bacteria, contributing to the attenuation of the sinking flux with depth.

=== Sinking velocity ===
The range of recorded sinking velocities of particles in the oceans spans from negative (particles float toward the surface) to several km per day (as with salp fecal pellets) When considering the sinking velocity of an individual particle, a first approximation can be obtained from Stokes' law (originally derived for spherical, non-porous particles and laminar flow) combined with White's approximation, which suggest that sinking velocity increases linearly with excess density (the difference from the water density) and the square of particle diameter (i.e., linearly with the particle area). Building on these expectations, many studies have tried to relate sinking velocity primarily to size, which has been shown to be a useful predictor for particles generated in controlled environments (e.g., roller tanks. However, strong relationships were only observed when all particles were generated using the same water/plankton community. When particles were made by different plankton communities, size alone was a bad predictor (e.g., Diercks and Asper, 1997) strongly supporting notions that particle densities and shapes vary widely depending on the source material.

Packaging and porosity contribute appreciably to determining sinking velocities. On the one hand, adding ballasting materials, such as diatom frustules, to aggregates may lead to an increase in sinking velocities owing to the increase in excess density. On the other hand, the addition of ballasting mineral particles to marine particle populations frequently leads to smaller more densely packed aggregates that sink slower because of their smaller size. Mucous-rich particles have been shown to float despite relatively large sizes, whereas oil- or plastic-containing aggregates have been shown to sink rapidly despite the presence of substances with an excess density smaller than seawater. In natural environments, particles are formed through different mechanisms, by different organisms, and under varying environmental conditions that affect aggregation (e.g., salinity, pH, minerals), ballasting (e.g., dust deposition, sediment load; van der Jagt et al., 2018) and sinking behaviour (e.g., viscosity;). A universal conversion of size-to-sinking velocity is hence impracticable.

=== Role in the lower aquatic food web ===
Along with dissolved organic matter, POM drives the lower aquatic food web by providing energy in the form of carbohydrates, sugars, and other polymers that can be degraded. POM in water bodies is derived from terrestrial inputs (e.g. soil organic matter, leaf litterfall), submerged or floating aquatic vegetation, or autochthonous production of algae (living or detrital). Each source of POM has its own chemical composition that affects its lability, or accessibility to the food web. Algal-derived POM is thought to be most labile, but there is growing evidence that terrestrially derived POM can supplement the diets of micro-organisms such as zooplankton when primary productivity is limited.

=== The biological carbon pump ===
The dynamics of the particulate organic carbon (POC) pool in the ocean are central to the marine carbon cycle. POC is the link between surface primary production, the deep ocean, and sediments. The rate at which POC is degraded in the dark ocean can impact atmospheric CO_{2} concentration. Therefore, a central focus of marine organic geochemistry studies is to improve the understanding of POC distribution, composition, and cycling. The last few decades have seen improvements in analytical techniques that have greatly expanded what can be measured, both in terms of organic compound structural diversity and isotopic composition, and complementary molecular omics studies.

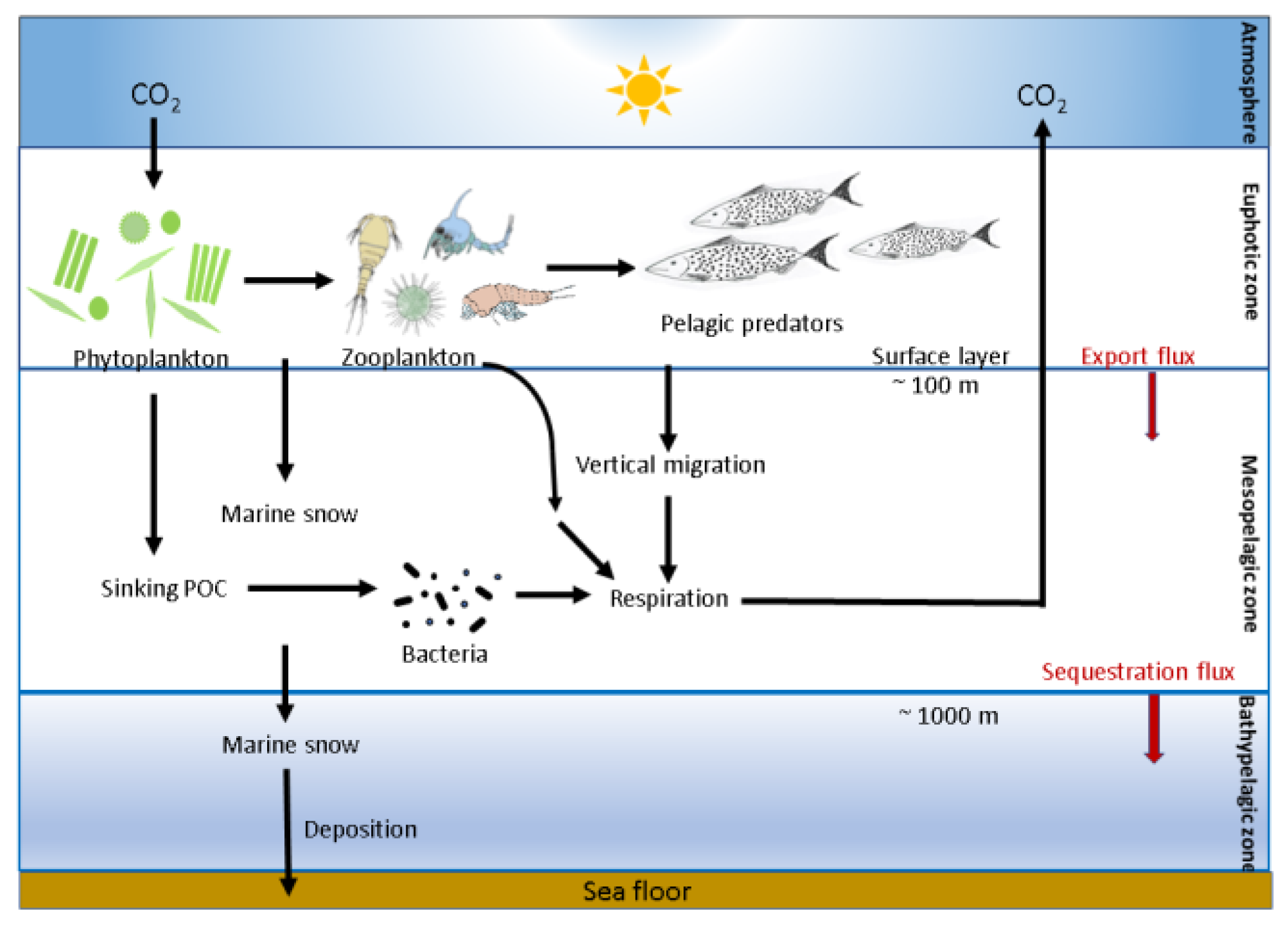
Central role of marine snow in the ocean carbon pump

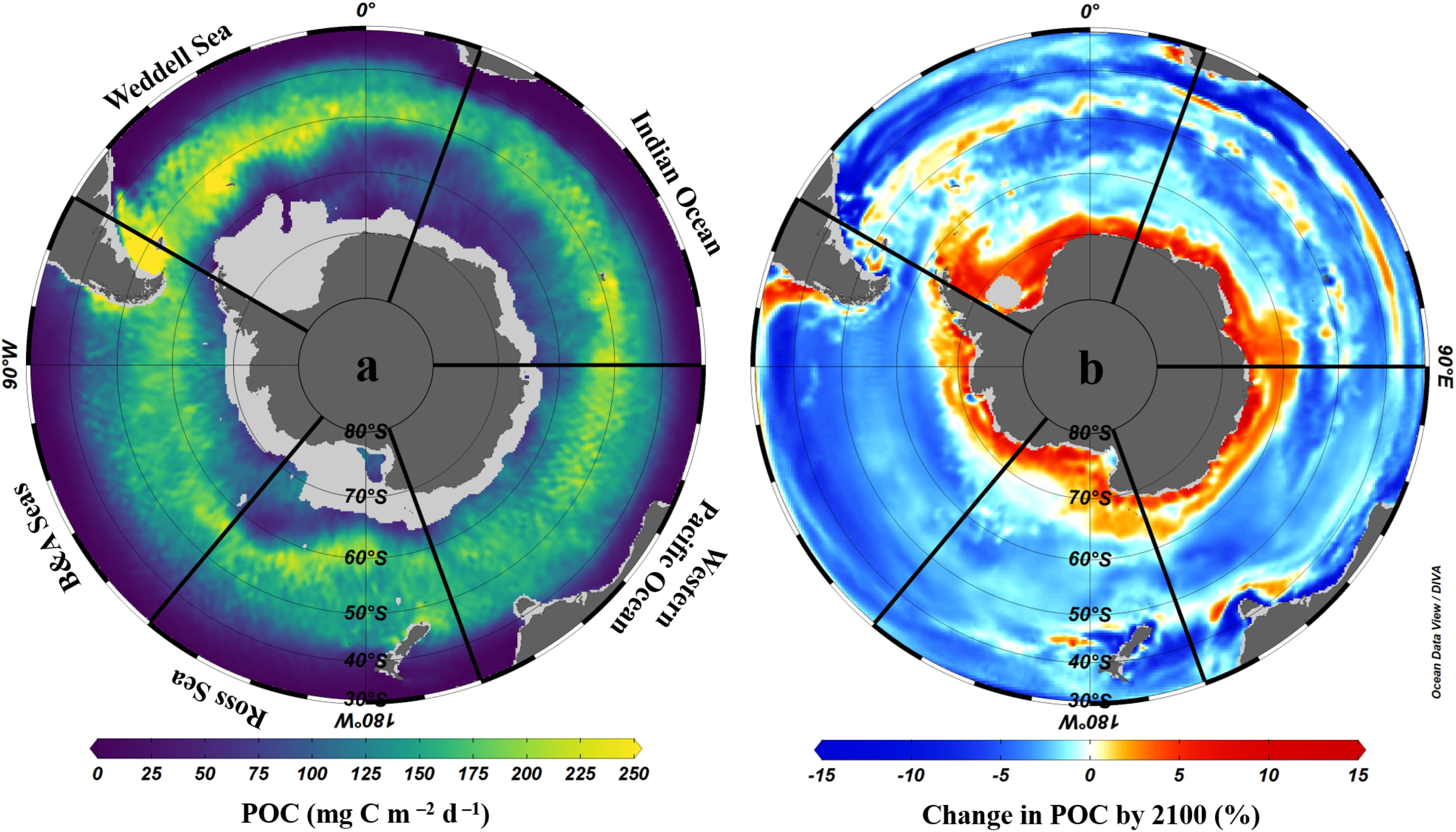
Mean annual POC export at 100 m across the Southern Ocean

As illustrated in the diagram, phytoplankton fix carbon dioxide in the euphotic zone using solar energy and produce POC. POC formed in the euphotic zone is processed by marine microorganisms (microbes), zooplankton and their consumers into organic aggregates (marine snow), which is then exported to the mesopelagic (200–1000 m depth) and bathypelagic zones by sinking and vertical migration by zooplankton and fish.

The biological carbon pump describes the collection of biogeochemical processes associated with the production, sinking, and remineralization of organic carbon in the ocean. In brief, photosynthesis by microorganisms in the upper tens of meters of the water column fix inorganic carbon (any of the chemical species of dissolved carbon dioxide) into biomass. When this biomass sinks to the deep ocean, a portion of it fuels the metabolism of the organisms living there, including deep-sea fish and benthic organisms. Zooplankton play a critical role in shaping particle flux through ingestion and fragmentation of particles, production of fast-sinking fecal material and active vertical migration.

Besides the importance of "exported" organic carbon as a food source for deep ocean organisms, the biological carbon pump provides a valuable ecosystem function: Exported organic carbon transports an estimated 5–20 Gt C each year to the deep ocean, where some of it (~0.2–0.5 Gt C) is sequestered for several millennia. The biological carbon pump is hence of similar magnitude to current carbon emissions from fossil fuels (~10 Gt C year−1). Any changes in its magnitude caused by a warming world may have direct implications for both deep-sea organisms and atmospheric carbon dioxide concentrations.

The magnitude and efficiency (amount of carbon sequestered relative to primary production) of the biological carbon pump, hence ocean carbon storage, is partly determined by the amount of organic matter exported and the rate at which it is remineralized (i.e., the rate with which sinking organic matter is reworked and respired in the mesopelagic zone region. Especially particle size and composition are important parameters determining how fast a particle sinks, how much material it contains, and which organisms can find and utilize it.

Sinking particles can be phytoplankton, zooplankton, detritus, fecal pellets, or a mix of these. They range in size from a few micrometers to several centimeters, with particles of a diameter of >0.5 mm being referred to as marine snow. In general, particles in a fluid are thought to sink once their densities are higher than the ambient fluid, i.e., when excess densities are larger than zero. Larger individual phytoplankton cells can thus contribute to sedimentary fluxes. For example, large diatom cells and diatom chains with a diameter of >5 μm have been shown to sink at rates up to several 10 s meters per day, though this is only possible owing to the heavy ballast of a silica frustule. Both size and density affect particle sinking velocity; for example, for sinking velocities that follow Stokes' Law, doubling the size of the particle increases the sinking speed by a factor of 4. However, the highly porous nature of many marine particles means that they do not obey Stokes' Law because small changes in particle density (i.e., compactness) can have a large impact on their sinking velocities. Large sinking particles are typically of two types: (1) aggregates formed from a number of primary particles, including phytoplankton, bacteria, fecal pellets, live protozoa and zooplankton and debris, and (2) zooplankton fecal pellets, which can dominate particle flux events and sink at velocities exceeding 1,000 m d^{−1}.

Knowing the size, abundance, structure and composition (e.g. carbon content) of settling particles is important as these characteristics impose fundamental constraints on the biogeochemical cycling of carbon. For example, changes in climate are expected to facilitate a shift in species composition in a manner that alters the elemental composition of particulate matter, cell size and the trajectory of carbon through the food web, influencing the proportion of biomass exported to depth. As such, any climate-induced change in the structure or function of phytoplankton communities is likely to alter the efficiency of the biological carbon pump, with feedbacks on the rate of climate change.

=== Bioluminescent shunt hypothesis ===
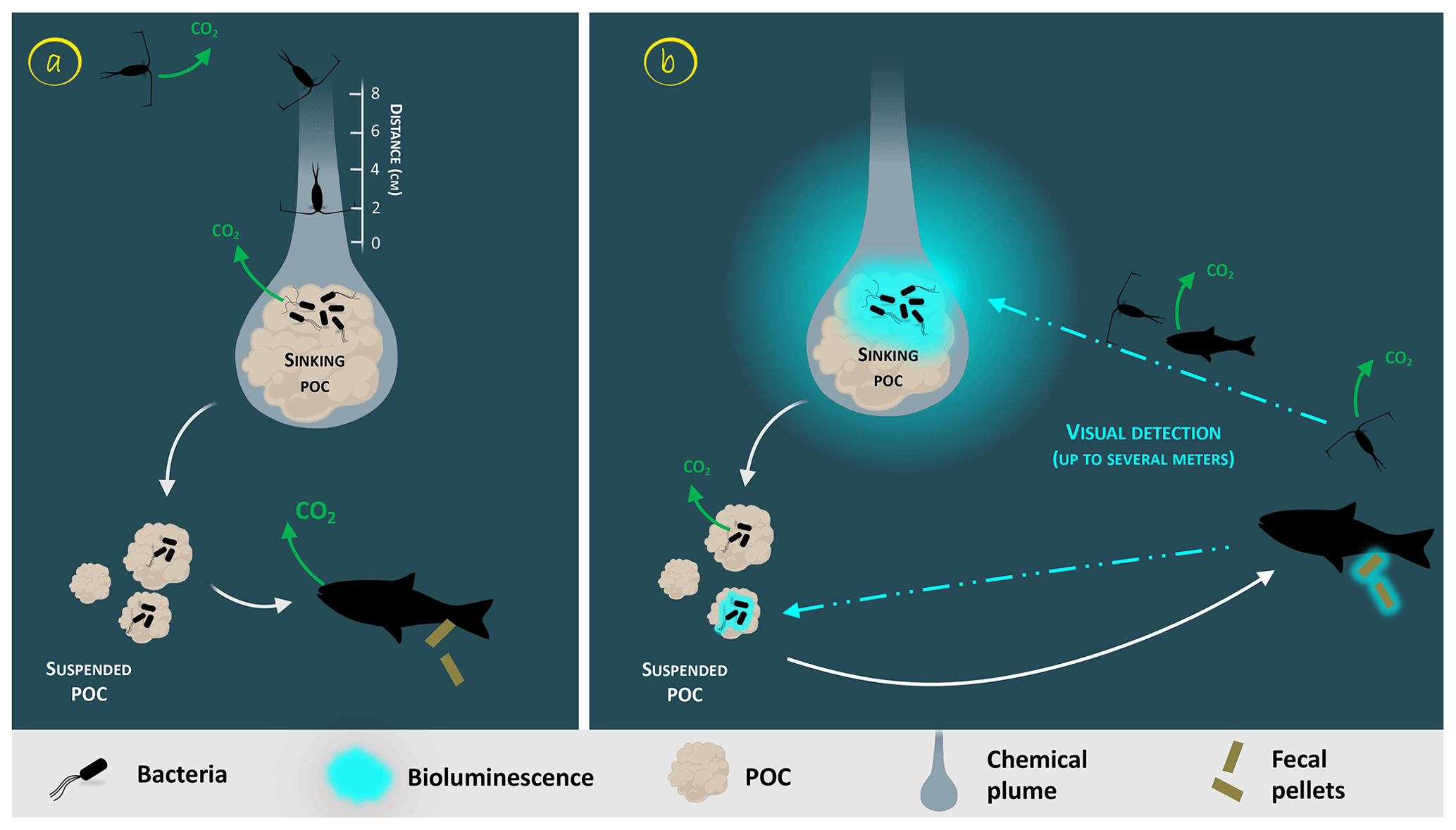
Carbon fluxes at the level of a gravitational sinking particle

The consumption of the bioluminescent POC by fish can lead to the emission of bioluminescent fecal pellets (repackaging), which can also be produced with non-bioluminescent POC if the fish gut is already charged with bioluminescent bacteria.

In the diagram on the right, the sinking POC is moving downward followed by a chemical plume. The plain white arrows represent the carbon flow. Panel (a) represents the classical view of a non-bioluminescent particle. The length of the plume is identified by the scale on the side. Panel (b) represents the case of a glowing particle in the bioluminescence shunt hypothesis. Bioluminescent bacteria are represented aggregated onto the particle. Their light emission is shown as a bluish cloud around it. Blue dotted arrows represent the visual detection and the movement toward the particle of the consumer organisms. Increasing the visual detection allows a better detection by upper trophic levels, potentially leading to the fragmentation of sinking POC into suspended POC due to sloppy feeding.

== See also ==
- Microbial loop
- Particulate matter
- Total organic carbon

== Literature ==
- Burd, Adrian B.: Modeling the vertical flux of organic carbon in the global ocean. Annual Review of Marine Science 16.1 (2024): 135-161.
