= Sediment trap =

Instrument used in oceanography to measure the quantity of sinking particulate material

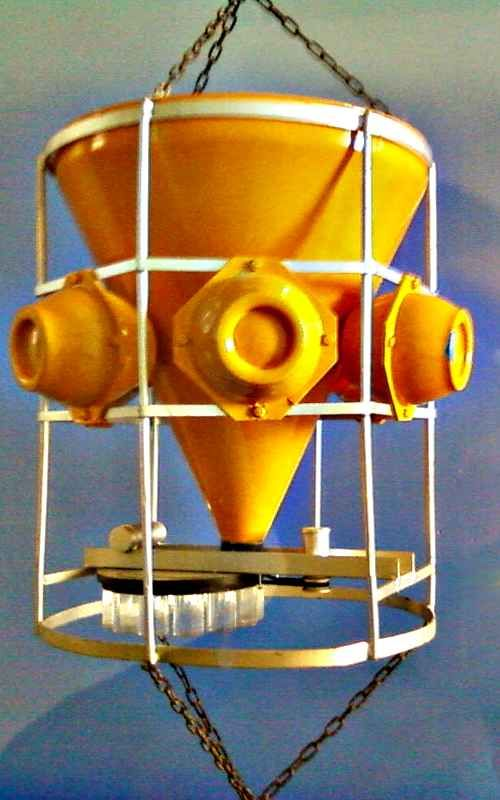
Model of a sediment trap: It mainly consists of a huge funnel, a ring of Glass floats (3 are visible) and a revolving wheel with sample bottles.

Sediment traps are instruments used in oceanography and limnology to measure the quantity of sinking particulate organic (and inorganic) material in aquatic systems, usually oceans, lakes, or reservoirs. This flux of material is the product of biological and ecological processes typically within the surface euphotic zone, and is of interest to scientists studying the role of the biological pump in the carbon cycle.

Sediments traps normally consist of an upward-facing funnel that directs sinking particulate matter (e.g. marine snow) towards a mechanism for collection and preservation. Typically, traps operate over an extended period of time (weeks to months) and their collection mechanisms may consist of a series of sampling vessels that are cycled through to allow the trap to record the changes in sinking flux with time (for instance, across a seasonal cycle). Preservation of collected material is necessary because of these long deployments, and prevents sample decomposition and its consumption by zooplankton "swimmers".

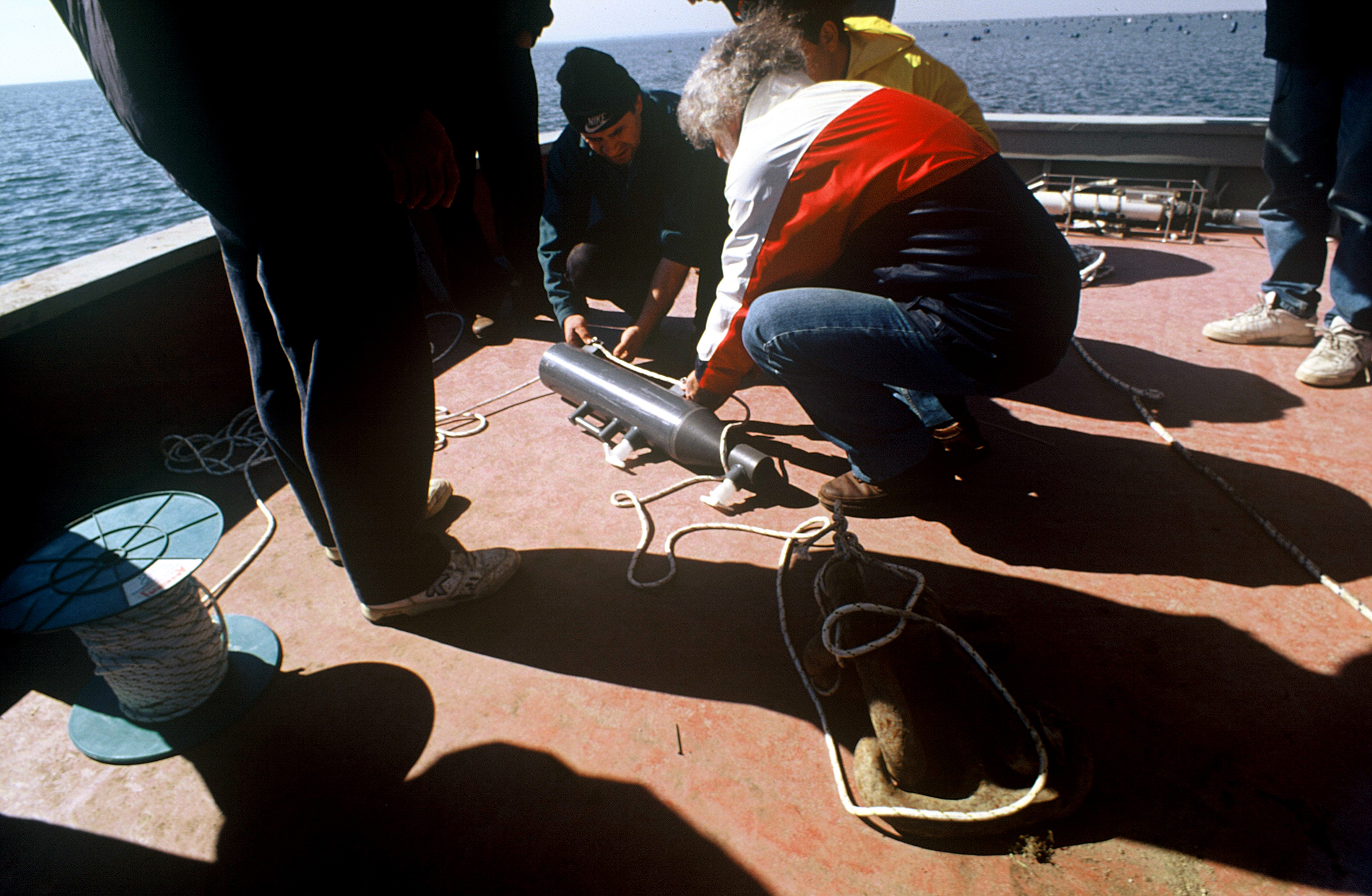
Sediment trap deployment in Thermaikos Gulf, Greece, 2000. The sediment trap has H/D 5.5, internal diameter 127 mm, and a net at the top. The sediment trap had been cast at 25-30 m depth and 3 m above seabed. The anchor (chain) of the mooring can also be seen.

Traps are often moored at a specific depth in the water column (usually below the euphotic zone or mixed layer) in a particular location, but some are so-called Lagrangian traps that drift with the surrounding ocean currents (though they may remain at a fixed depth). These latter traps travel with the biological systems that they study, while moored traps are subject to variability introduced by different systems (or states of systems) "passing by". However, because of their fixed location moored traps are straightforward to recover for analysis of their measurements. Lagrangian traps must surface at a predetermined time, and report their position (usually via satellite) in order to be recovered.

== See also ==
- Biological pump
- f-ratio
- Marine snow
- Mooring (oceanography)
- Primary production
