= Aphotic zone =

Portion of a lake or ocean where less than 1% of sunlight penetrates

The aphotic zone (aphotic from Greek prefix ἀ- + φῶς "without light") is the portion of a lake or ocean where there is little or no sunlight. It is formally defined as the depths beyond which less than 1 percent of sunlight penetrates. Above the aphotic zone is the photic zone, which consists of the euphotic zone and the dysphotic zone. The euphotic zone is the layer of water in which there is enough light for net photosynthesis to occur. The dysphotic zone, also known as the twilight zone, is the layer of water with enough light for predators to see but not enough for the rate of photosynthesis to be greater than the rate of respiration.

The depth at which less than one percent of sunlight reaches begins the aphotic zone. While most of the ocean's biomass lives in the photic zone, the majority of the ocean's water lies in the aphotic zone. Bioluminescence is more abundant than sunlight in this zone. Most food in this zone comes from dead organisms sinking to the bottom of the lake or ocean from overlying waters.

The depth of the aphotic zone can be greatly affected by such things as turbidity and the season of the year. The aphotic zone underlies the photic zone, which is that portion of a lake or ocean directly affected by sunlight.

== The Dark Ocean ==
The layers of the pelagic zone. All but the epipelagic zone make up the aphotic zone.

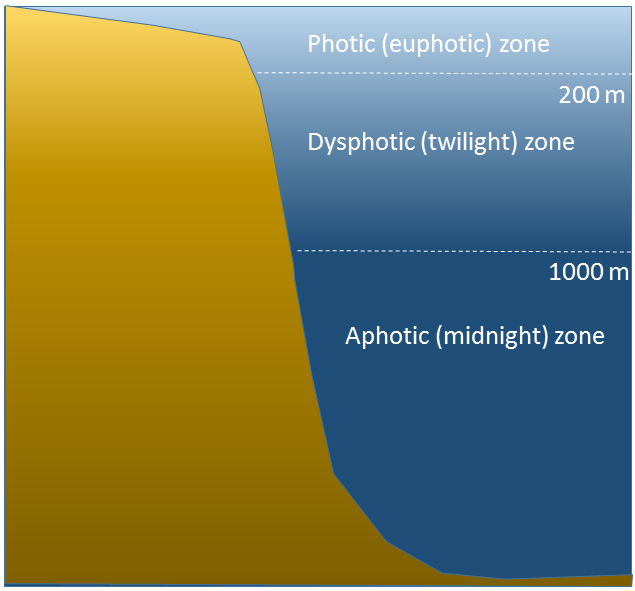
Zones of the water column as defined by the amount of light penetration. The mesopelagic is sometimes referred to as the dysphotic zone.

In the ocean, the aphotic zone is sometimes referred to as the dark ocean. Depending on how it is defined, the aphotic zone of the ocean begins between depths of about 200 m (660 ft) to 800 m (2,600 ft) and extends to the ocean floor. The majority of the ocean is aphotic, with the average depth of the sea being 4,267 m (13,999 ft) deep; the deepest part of the sea, the Challenger Deep in the Mariana Trench, is about 11,000 m (36,000 ft) deep. The depth at which the aphotic zone begins in the ocean depends on many factors. In clear, tropical water sunlight can penetrate deeper and so the aphotic zone starts at greater depths. Around the poles, the angle of the sunlight means it does not penetrate as deeply so the aphotic zone is shallower. If the water is turbid, suspended material can block light from penetrating, resulting in a shallower aphotic zone. Temperatures can range from roughly 0 °C (32 °F) to 6 °C (43 °F).

The aphotic zone is further divided into the mesopelagic, bathyal, abyssal, and hadal zones. The mesopelagic zone extends from 200 metres (656 ft) to 2,000 metres (6,562 ft). The bathyal zone extends from 2,000 metres (6,562 ft) to 4,000 metres (13,123 ft). The abyssal zone extends from 4,000 metres (13,123 ft) to 6,000 metres (19,685 ft) or 6,500 metres (21,325 ft), depending on the authority. The hadal zone refers to the greatest depths, deeper than the abyssal zone. Some twilight occurs in the mesopelagic zone, but creatures below the mesopelagic must be able to live in complete darkness.

== Life in the aphotic zone ==
Though photosynthesis cannot occur in the aphotic zone, it is not unusual to find an abundance of phytoplankton there. Convective mixing due to cooling surface water sinking can increase the concentration of phytoplankton in the aphotic zone and lead to under-estimations of primary production in the euphotic zone during convective mixing events.

Animals which inhabit the aphotic zone, including the gulper eel, giant squid, anglerfish, and vampire squid, exhibit adaptations to the low-light conditions such as bioluminescence. Benthic communities around methane seeps rely on methane-oxidizing microorganisms to supply energy to other microorganisms.

Some animals can cross between the photic and aphotic zones in search of food. For example, the sperm whale and the southern elephant seal occasionally hunt in the aphotic zone.

== Aphotic zone migration ==
At night, many organisms including copepods and invertebrate larvae migrate upwards from the aphotic zone to feed on phytoplankton in the epipelagic, in turn attracting predators like squid, hatchetfish, and lantern fish. This constitutes the largest routine migration on Earth.

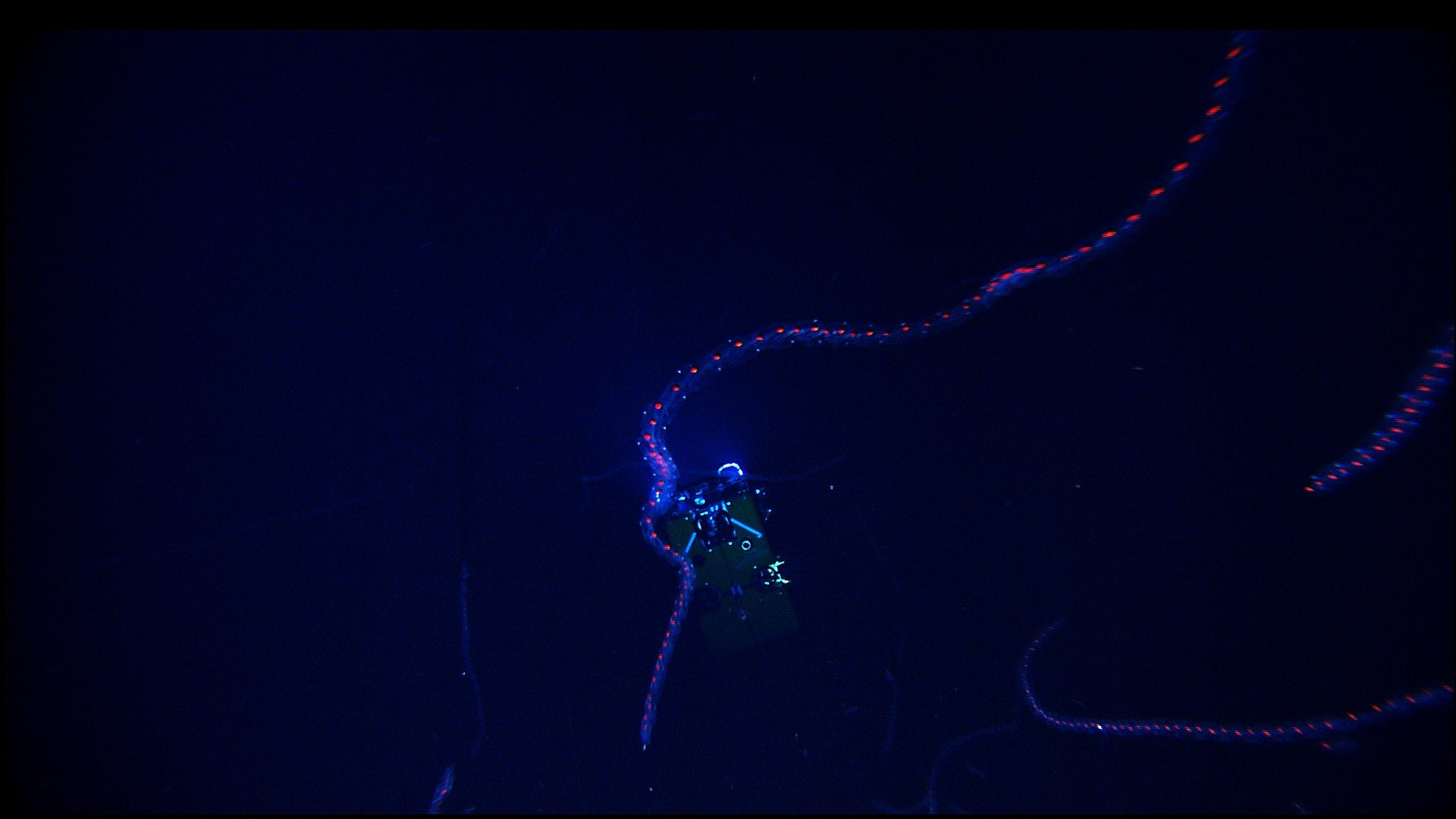
The migration of bioluminescent organisms from aphotic zone

== See also ==
- Abyssal zone
- Benthic zone
- Hadal zone
- Pelagic zone
- Photic zone
