= Climate restoration =

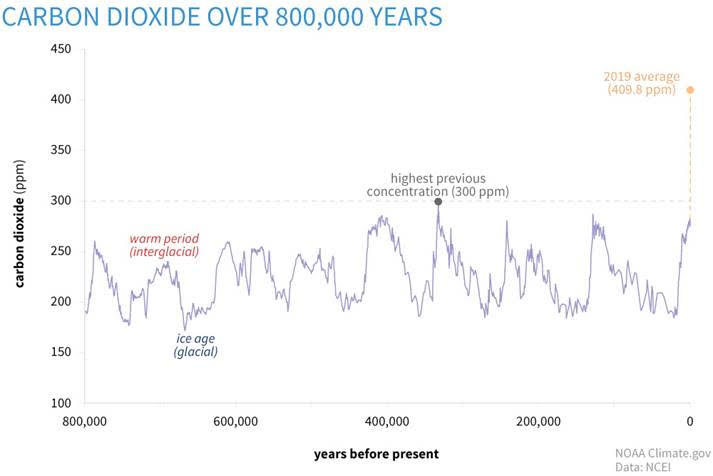
Today's CO_{2} levels (424 ppm) are more than 120 ppm higher than the highest levels humans have actually survived long-term (300 ppm). In other words, they exceed historically safe levels by 40%. Nature has reduced CO_{2} levels by roughly the same amount we need to, about 10 times in the last million years, during the ice age cycle. Increased dust storms blow iron-rich dust into the ocean, distributing minuscule amounts of iron and inducing rapid, healthy phytoplankton growth. The photosynthesis pulls massive amounts of CO_{2} out of the air and into biocarbon, along with feeding the entire marine food web. Much of the biocarbon gets stored in the deep ocean, then released when the ice-age ends. The phytoplankton growth corresponds with ocean iron concentration.

A visualization of phytoplankton bloom populations in the North Atlantic and North Pacific oceans from March 2003 to October 2006. The blue areas are nutrient deficient. Green to yellow show blooms fed by dust blown from nearby landmasses.

Climate restoration refers to intentionally restoring preindustrial levels of greenhouse gases by 2050, thereby ending the climate crisis and enabling future generations of humanity and nature to flourish. The climate restoration movement is committed to lowering carbon dioxide (CO_{2}) levels below 300 parts per million (ppm)—the levels at which humans evolved and have thrived.

Climate-restoration solutions include large-scale carbon dioxide removal (CDR)) to pull down the excess atmospheric CO_{2} built up in the air since the industrial revolution. Climate-restoration actions also include restoring pre-industrial atmospheric methane levels by accelerating natural methane oxidation.

Climate restoration expands on the legacy climate goal of stabilizing Earth's climate by achieving "net-zero emissions." The movement calls for the transition to clean energy as well as for restoring preindustrial CO_{2} levels. These levels allowed humanity to develop agriculture and civilizations, so they are considered historically safe.

== Mitigation and restoration ==
Advocates of climate restoration point out that continuing on our current climate trajectory threatens the long-term survival of society, current biodiversity, and humanity itself. They cite a moral imperative to leave a safe climate to our children and future generations. But the current mitigation pathway carries the risk that climatic conditions will worsen beyond our ability to adapt. As stated in "The Economist" in November 2017, "in any realistic scenario, emissions cannot be cut fast enough to keep the total stock of greenhouse gases sufficiently small to limit the rise in temperature successfully. But there is barely any public discussion of how to bring about the extra "negative emissions" needed to reduce the stock of CO_{2} ... Unless that changes, the promise of limiting the harm of climate change is almost certain to be broken." Recent peer-reviewed research supports this argument, emphasizing that large-scale deployment of carbon dioxide removal (CDR) and negative emission technologies will be essential to achieve meaningful climate restoration. According to Fawzy et al. (2020), even with aggressive mitigation strategies, several gigatonnes of CO_{2} per year must be removed from the atmosphere by mid-century to meet restoration and stabilization goals.

== Climate restoration as a policy goal ==
A first peer-reviewed article about climate restoration was published in April 2018 by the Rand Corporation. The analysis "examines climate restoration through the lens of risk management under conditions of deep uncertainty, exploring the technology, economic, and policy conditions under which it might be possible to achieve various climate restoration goals and the conditions under which society might be better off with (rather than without) a climate restoration goal." One key finding of the study is that it would be possible to restore the CO_{2} atmospheric concentrations to preindustrial levels at an acceptable cost under two scenarios, where greenhouse gas reductions and direct air capture (DAC) technologies prove to be economically efficient. One example is Carbon Engineering, a Canadian-based clean energy company focussing on the commercialization of Direct Air Capture (DAC) technology that captures carbon dioxide (CO_{2}) directly from the atmosphere.

One key recommendation of the Rand Corporation study is that an ambitious climate restoration goal may seek to achieve preindustrial concentration by 2075, or by the end of the century. It concludes that "The best we can do is pursue climate restoration with a passion while embedding it in a process of testing, experimentation, correction, and discovery."

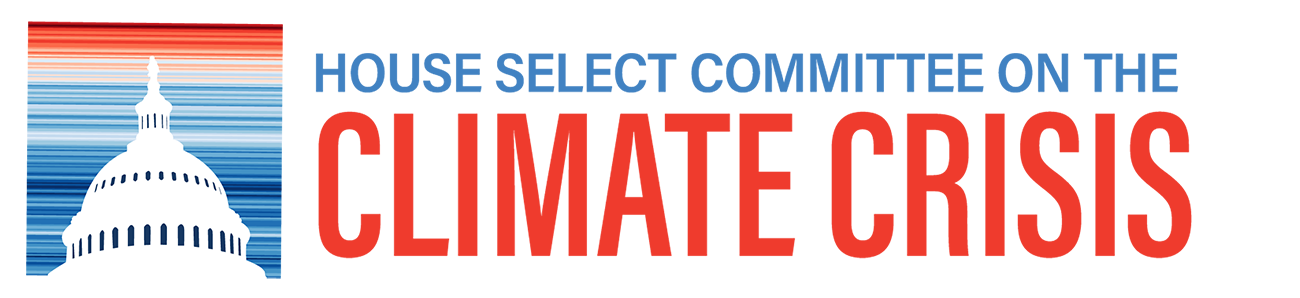
The committee's logo, showing a silhouette of the Capitol dome before a warming stripes graphic depicting annual global temperature rise.

On September 25, 2018, Rep. Jamie Raskin introduced a resolution on Climate Restoration to the U.S House Committee of Energy and Commerce, concluding with "Whereas scientists have researched methods for keeping warming below 2°C, but have not yet researched the best methods to remove all excess CO_{2}, stop sea-level rise, and restore a safe and healthy climate for future generations; and whereas declaring a goal of restoring a safe and healthy climate will encourage scientists to research the most effective ways to restore safe CO_{2} levels, stop sea-level rise, and restore a safe and healthy climate for future generations." This was followed by the Congressional Climate Emergency Resolutions (S.Con.Res.22, H.Con.Res.52) which "demands a national, social, industrial, and economic mobilization of the resources and labor of the United States at a massive-scale to halt, reverse, mitigate, and prepare for the consequences of the climate emergency and to restore the climate for future generations...."

On August 23, 2023, the California Senate passed SR-34, the nation's first resolution to explicitly recognize climate restoration as a policy priority It concludes: "WHEREAS, Climate restoration will benefit the people of the State of California by reducing losses and damage from wildfires, while producing positive effects on human and ecosystem health, industry, and jobs in agriculture and other sectors; now, therefore, be it resolved by the Senate of the State of California, That the Senate formally recognizes the obligation to future generations to restore a safe climate, and declares climate restoration, along with achieving net-zero and net-negative CO_{2} emissions, a climate policy priority; and be it further resolved, That the Senate calls on the State Air Resources Board to engage necessary federal entities as appropriate to urge the United States Ambassador to the United Nations to propose a climate treaty that would restore and stabilize GHG levels as our common climate goal."

== Critical parameters ==
The endpoint goal of climate restoration is to generally maximize the probability of survival of our species and civilization by restoring Atmospheric CO_{2} levels. The approximate target levels are those of the Holocene norm in which our species and civilization most recently evolved. That is stated technically as "pre-industrial", or poetically as "like our grandparents had a hundred years ago". Numerically the goal is stated as getting atmospheric CO_{2} back below the highest levels humans have actually survived long-term, 300 ppm, by 2050. Achieving this will require permanently removing approximately a trillion tonnes of atmospheric CO_{2}.

Critical parameters of the Earth System include:

- levels of climate forcing agents in the atmosphere, especially CO_{2} and methane for positive forcing and SO_{2} aerosol for negative forcing;
- global mean surface temperature (compared to some baseline) and its rate of increase;
- sea level and the rate that sea level is rising;
- pH and rate of ocean acidification.
- Ice levels of the polar ice caps.

One of the principal goals for climate restoration is to bring the CO_{2} level down from current level of ~420 ppm (2022) towards its pre-industrial level of ~280 ppm. Not only will this reduce CO_{2}'s global warming effect but also its effect on ocean acidification. The removed carbon would be sequestered or used as a construction material.

== Climate restoration open letter ==
On November 13, 2020, an open letter, put together by the youth organisation Worldward, calling for climate restoration was published in the Guardian newspaper. The letter was signed by prominent scientists and activists, including: Michael E Mann, Dr James Hansen, George Monbiot, Hindou Oumarou Ibrahim, Dr Rowan Williams, Bella Lack, Will Attenborough, Mark Lynas, Chloe Ardijis, Dr Shahrar Ali, and many more. After its publication, the letter was opened up to general signatories, and the signatories published on Worldward's website.

== Climate Restoration publications ==
=== Climate Risk Management Letter in Science Magazine ===
Early scientific arguments for what is now called climate restoration—specifically, the use of negative emissions to reduce atmospheric CO₂ rather than merely stabilize it—appeared before such pathways became mainstream in IPCC assessments. In a 2001 Science letter, Obersteiner et al. criticized “static stabilization” as non-robust under uncertainty and reframed climate policy as anticipatory risk management, emphasizing the potential importance of technologies that can rapidly remove greenhouse gases from the atmosphere. They identified biomass energy with carbon capture and permanent geological storage as a plausible mechanism for “net removal of carbon from the atmosphere (negative emissions),” potentially at a scale large enough to neutralize historical fossil-fuel emissions.

=== Early Conceptualising Conference Paper ===
In a 2004 conference paper, former IPCC chair Bert Bolin with Michael Obersteiner, Kenneth Möllersten, and Christian Azar argue that prevailing climate policy frameworks may be insufficient when viewed through a risk management perspective under deep uncertainty. They contend that the only concentration policy fully consistent with the objectives of the UNFCCC would be to bring greenhouse gas concentrations back to the stable bounds within which they fluctuated over the past 420,000 years, implying restoring atmospheric concentrations toward the historically observed range prior to anthropogenic perturbation. The authors highlight the strategic importance of negative emission technologies, particularly bioenergy with carbon capture and storage (BECCS). In retrospect, the paper bears a clear resemblance to “climate restoration,” insofar as it articulates the objective of returning atmospheric greenhouse gas concentrations toward historically stable levels rather than merely stabilizing them at elevated concentrations.

=== White Paper ===
On September 17, 2019, the Foundation for Climate Restoration published a White Paper on existing Climate Restoration solutions and developing technologies. These solutions and technologies include proven, commercially viable projects, such as creating synthetic rock from carbon captured in the air for use in construction and paving, as well as emerging methods for removing and storing carbon, restoring oceans and fisheries. The White Paper also discusses Climate Restoration strategy and costs. A main goal of the Foundation for Climate Restoration is the reduction of atmospheric CO_{2} to below 300 ppm (i.e. near its pre-industrial level) by 2050.

=== Climate Restoration: The Only Future That Will Sustain the Human Race ===
Authored by Peter Fiekowsky and Carole Douglis, this book was published on April 21, 2022. It describes, among others, the criteria for climate restoration: Permanence —so the CO_{2} stays out of the atmosphere for at least 100 years; Scalability —the method must be able to remove at least 25 billion tons of CO_{2} a year; Financial viability—funding for at-scale carbon removal must be in place. It then describes four solutions that appear to fit the criteria: a) ocean fertilization; b) synthetic limestone; c) seaweed; d) enhanced atmospheric methane oxidation using iron chloride. It claims that the required technologies and finance are already available to restore a safe climate. Scale-up requires that the restoration goal be endorsed by the UN and large NGOs so that investors and philanthropists can justify funding the projects. The authors do not assume government funding will be forthcoming. The book is currently being revised for a second edition, to appear in 2025. The new version will emphasize ocean iron fertilization, as recent research shows that this solution is the most likely to scale to meet the challenge.

== Limitations ==
Not every aspect of the Earth System can be returned to a previous state: notably the warming of the deep sea or deep ocean and the associated sea level rise which has already taken place may be essentially irreversible this century. Conversely, there are certain aspects of the Earth System that need to be improved with respect to the recent past: notably food productivity, considering an increased global population by 2050 or 2100.

== Key organisations ==
- The Foundation for Climate Restoration
- The Climate Restoration Alliance
- The Climate Restoration Program
- DeepGreen Solutions
- Worldward
