= Victor Smetacek =

Indian-German oceanographer & marine biologist

Victor Smetacek (born 1946 in Kolkata, India) is an Indian-German oceanographer and marine biologist. From 1986 to 2011, he served as professor of biological oceanography at the University of Bremen and head of the Pelagic Ecosystems Division at the Alfred Wegener Institute for Polar and Marine Research in Bremerhaven, Germany.

== Early life and education ==
Victor Shahed Smetacek was born in 1946 in Kolkata, India. He grew up in the foothills of the Himalayas and developed a passion for natural history during his childhood. Motivated by a desire to address societal challenges, including famines occurring in India at the time, he pursued studies in marine biology.

In 1964, Smetacek earned his B.Sc. in Biology and Economics from Government Degree College in Nainital, which was then affiliated with Agra University (now Kumaon University). He subsequently received a scholarship from the German Academic Exchange Service (DAAD) to study marine biology at Kiel University in Germany.

Smetacek completed his doctoral degree in 1975 at Kiel University with a dissertation titled "Die Sukzession des Phytoplanktons in der westlichen Kieler Bucht" (The Succession of Phytoplankton in the Western Kiel Bight). He completed his habilitation in 1985 at Kiel University with a thesis on "Die Struktur mariner pelagischer Systeme: Ansätze zu einer Synthese von physiko-chemischen und biologischen Betrachtungsweisen" (The Structure of Marine Pelagic Systems: Approaches to a Synthesis of Physico-chemical and Biological Perspectives).

== Academic career ==
Smetacek has been affiliated with the Alfred Wegener Institute for Polar and Marine Research in Bremerhaven since 1986, where he headed the Pelagic Ecosystems Division. He served as chief scientist on eight interdisciplinary, international research cruises aboard the RV Polarstern. As Professor of Bio-Oceanography at the University of Bremen from 1986 to 2011, he supervised many PhD and diploma students.

== Research and publications ==
Smetacek has published numerous papers in leading scientific journals, including Nature and Science. He is recognised for his interdisciplinary approach and innovative thinking in marine sciences, particularly his work on iron fertilisation experiments in the Southern Ocean, including the EisenEx, EIFEX and LOHAFEX projects.

Beyond traditional oceanography, he has explored diverse topics. In 1992, he published a paper in Nature on the connection between Leonardo da Vinci’s mirror-writing and left-handedness. In 2010, he proposed a hypothesis about the core function of sleep, suggesting it involves recalibration and readjustment of sense organs and brain-body connections, published in Medical Hypotheses. Smetacek proposed and helped develop the "whale poop" hypothesis, which describes how whales play a crucial role as ecosystem engineers in ocean nutrient cycling.

In a 2003 interview with Nature, he discussed his research philosophy and interdisciplinary thinking.

In recent years, Smetacek has developed and promoted the concept of open-ocean, floating Sargassum aquafarms, which he refers to as the "third agricultural revolution." This vision led to the establishment of Seafields Solutions Ltd., a UK-based start-up working to implement this concept.

== Awards and recognition ==
Smetacek has received several prestigious awards throughout his career:

- A. G. Huntsman Award for Excellence in the Marine Sciences (1995) – recognised as "one of the world's leading biological oceanographers"
- Manley-Bendall Medal (2003) – awarded by the Oceanographic Institute in Paris for his work in marine biology and expertise on plankton
- Pravasi Bharatiya Samman (Overseas Indian Award) (2012) – presented by the Government of India for outstanding contributions in the field of science
