= LOHAFEX =

Ocean iron fertilization experiment

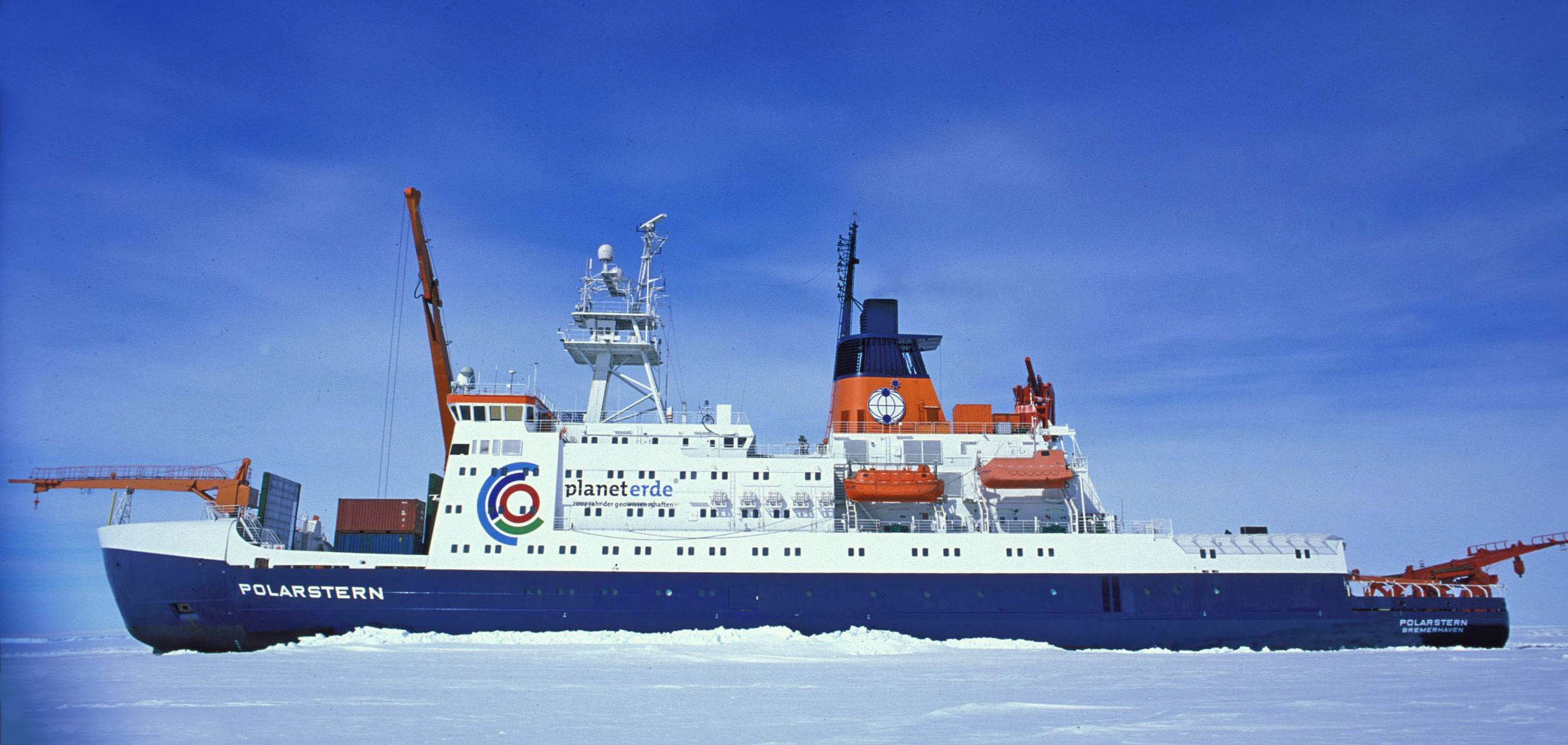
The Polarstern, the German research vessel used to conduct the LOHAFEX experiment.

LOHAFEX was an ocean iron fertilization experiment jointly planned by the Council of Scientific and Industrial Research (CSIR) in India and the Helmholtz Association in Germany. The purpose of the experiment was to see if the iron would cause an algal bloom and trap carbon dioxide from the atmosphere. While an algal bloom did result, it was smaller than expected and as most of the algae were consumed by zooplankton instead of sinking to the ocean floor, the amount of carbon dioxide permanently removed from the atmosphere was deemed negligible. The result was thus a setback for plans to use iron fertilization of the oceans to create negative carbon dioxide emissions.

== Background ==
The experiment followed a Memorandum of Understanding signed on 30 October 2007 by Dr. T. Ramaswami, Director General, CSIR, and Dr. Juergen Mlynek, President, Helmholtz Foundation, Germany, on Cooperation in Marine Sciences, during the visit of then German Chancellor, Angela Merkel, to India. The experiment was conducted mainly by CSIR-National Institute of Oceanography, India (NIO), Goa, and Alfred-Wegener Institute of Polar and Marine Research (AWI), Bremerhaven, with participation of scientists from Chile, France, Spain and the United Kingdom. The German research vessel, Polarstern, was utilized for the experiment on her ANT XXV/3 cruise. It was jointly led by Wajih Naqvi of CSIR-NIO and Victor Smetacek of AWI. Weekly reports of the expedition were published on the website of AWI.

== Course of the experiment ==
A cyclonic eddy centered on 48 deg S, 16 deg E was selected for fertilization. The experiment began on India's Republic Day (26 January 2009). 10 tonnes (9.8 long tons; 11 short tons) of ferrous sulfate dissolved in seawater was spread over an area of 300 square kilometres (120 sq mi), and the patch created was monitored for 38 days to investigate the effects of iron addition on marine biogeochemistry and ecosystem. Another iron addition of similar magnitude was done two weeks later. It was expected that iron addition would trigger algal blooms, leading to sequestration of carbon dioxide from the atmosphere.

The ship left Cape Town on 7 January 2009. The expedition ended after 70 days on 17 March 2009 in Punta Arenas, Chile.

== Opposition and protests ==
Following protests from several NGOs, the German government ordered a halt of the experiment. Environmentalists feared damage to the marine ecosystem from an artificial algal bloom. The critics argued that long-term effects of ocean fertilization would not be detectable during short-term observation. Other critics feared the entry into large-scale manipulation of ecosystems with these large geo-engineering experiments. The German government sent the proposal for scientific and legal reviews that were supportive of the project and the experiment was allowed to continue.

== Prior experiments ==
LOHAFEX was not the first experiment of its kind. In 2000 and 2004, comparable amounts of iron sulfate were discharged from the same ship (de:EisenEx experiment). 10 to 20 percent of the algal bloom died off and sank to the sea floor. This removed carbon from the atmosphere, creating the intended carbon sink effect.

== Results ==
As expected iron fertilization led to development of a bloom during LOHAFEX, but the chlorophyll increase within the fertilized patch, an indicator of biomass, was smaller than in previous experiments. The algal bloom also stimulated the growth of zooplankton that feed on them. The zooplankton in turn are consumed by higher organisms. Thus, ocean fertilization with iron also contributes to the carbon-fixing marine biomass of fish species which have been removed from the ocean by over-fishing. By increasing marine primary production, large scale iron fertilization could increase marine biomass.

In contrast to the other experiments (e.g. EisenEX) the uptake of the algae by zooplankton left no relevant organic carbon to sink to the ocean floor. Thus, the applied iron did not contribute to the sequestration of carbon dioxide from the atmosphere.
