= Ashfall =

Ashfall may refer to:

- Ash fall, a volcanic phenomenon
- Ashfall Fossil Beds, a protected area in Nebraska, United States
- Ashfall (film), a 2019 South Korean film

== See also ==
- Ashfall bed
- Ashfall advisory
