= Peter Fiekowsky =

American physicist and author

- Born: August 15, 1955
- Education: Massachusetts Institute of Technology (SB)
- Occupations: Physicist, social entrepreneur, writer, investor
- Known for: Climate restoration

Peter Fiekowsky is an American physicist, author and founder of the field of climate restoration and author of Climate Restoration: The Only Future That Will Sustain the Human Race (Rivertown Books, 2022, ISBN 978-1953943101). He has founded or co-founded several organizations committed to restoring pre-industrial CO_{2} levels by 2050. They include the Foundation for Climate Restoration, Methane Action, the Climate Restoration Safety and Governance Board, the Climate Restoration Fund, the Climate Restoration Alliance and the Climate Restoration Program.

== Early life and education ==
Fiekowsky holds a bachelor's degree in physics with a focus on infrared astrophysics from the Massachusetts Institute of Technology (MIT).

== Career ==
After graduating from MIT, Fiekowsky worked at the NASA Kuiper Airborne Observatory in Mountain View, California, and later at the Fairchild/Schlumberger Artificial Intelligence Lab in Palo Alto. In 1984, he founded Automated Visual Inspection LLC, a machine vision company. He holds 27 patents related to machine vision technology.

== Activism and social entrepreneurship ==
For three decades, Fiekowsky led citizen advocacy groups in the California chapters of Results. Fiekowsky led fundraising efforts and served as regional coordinator before taking a less active role in the 2010s.

=== Restoring the pre-industrial climate ===
In the first decade of the millennium, to assuage personal concerns about global warming, Fiekowsky began to research how humanity could restore the pre-industrial climate. In 2007, he helped establish the Citizens Climate Lobby (CCL) and was involved in designing a carbon tax study for the organization in 2012. He also established CCL's "100-Year Plan" group in 2013. In the ensuing several years he developed his thesis that this historically safe climate, with CO_{2} levels around 280 parts per million (ppm) requires removing by 2050 the one to two trillion tons of additional CO_{2} released into the atmosphere since the Industrial Revolution began.

=== Climate Restoration: The Only Future That Will Sustain the Human Race ===
In his first book Fiekowsky argues that net-zero alone by 2050 would lead to atmospheric CO_{2} levels over 450 ppm, 50 percent higher than human beings have survived on a long-term basis during all of our evolution and development. Net-zero represents the United Nations goal from 1990, and is no longer sufficient to safeguard the future. Fiekowsky's current ambition is for climate activists and policymakers at all levels to expand climate goals to include both net-zero and climate restoration. This would require removing 60 gigatons of CO_{2} a year and thus 1000 gigatons in 20 years (including drawing down continuing emissions).

=== Continued activism ===
In 2023, Fiekowsky published a paper which finds that direct-air capture (DAC) and other industrial carbon dioxide removal (CDR) methods are too costly to scale. According to his research, the solutions likely to reach climate-restoration scale swiftly and inexpensively are based on biomimicry: they replicate and accelerate natural CO_{2}-removal processes. These include ocean iron fertilization; atmospheric methane removal; and synthetic limestone. Implementing climate-restoration solutions immediately, Fiekowsky estimates, would pull enough CO_{2} from the air in the next few years to enable the world to reach net-zero by 2030. From there, continued implementation could restore pre-industrial CO_{2} levels by 2050.

=== Organizations ===
Fiekowsky has established or fostered a number of organizations to help achieve climate restoration, including the Foundation for Climate Restoration (F4CR, est. 2017) which has a mission to make climate restoration an idea whose time has come, and has been instrumental in starting discussions at the Vatican and the United Nations for making climate restoration a goal.
