= Syed Wajih Ahmad Naqvi =

Indian marine scientist

Dr. Syed Wajih Ahmad Naqvi is an Indian marine scientist and the former director of the National Institute of Oceanography. His work has concentrated in oceanic water chemistry, biogeochemistry, and chemical interrelations with living organisms. He has also performed research on freshwater ecosystems. He was the chief Indian scientist of LOHAFEX, an ocean iron fertilization experiment jointly planned by the Council of Scientific Industrial Research (CSIR), India, and Helmholtz Foundation, Germany.

== Life and career ==
Wajih Naqvi was born on August 10, 1954, at Amroha, Uttar Pradesh. The third of seven children of Aziz Fatima and Sibte Mehmood, Naqvi had his early schooling at Amroha (Imamul Madaris Intermediate College) and Bareilly (FR Islamia College) before moving to Lucknow for intermediate and higher education at Shia College and Lucknow University. After obtaining his M.Sc. degree in physical chemistry in 1974, Naqvi secured a CSIR Junior Research Fellowship to carry out research at the National Institute of Oceanography (NIO), Goa. After retiring from NIO in August 2016, Naqvi worked at Kuwait Institute for Scientific Research (KISR) for one year, and thereafter at the CSIR Headquarters as a distinguished scientist for three years. Presently, he is a distinguished visiting professor in the Department of Earth Sciences, Indian Institute of Technology, Kanpur. Naqvi is married to Khamisa Zarreen and has two children, Asad Mehmood and Sumbul Zarreen.

Early in his research career, Naqvi was mentored by the late Dr. R. Sen Gupta, under whose guidance he obtained a Ph.D. degree from Poona University in 1987. His research focussed on biologically mediated chemical transformations in the oxygen minimum zone (OMZ) of the Arabian Sea, which were largely unknown at that time. He provided conclusive evidence for large-scale denitrification (microbial reduction of nitrate to N_{2} and N_{2}O) in the water column, demarcated its spatial extent and determined its temporal variability. Quantifying denitrification using a variety of innovative techniques, Naqvi showed that the Arabian Sea is the world's largest oceanic denitrification site, accounting for at least one-third of the global water column denitrification. His results revealed that in contrast with the eastern Pacific, zones of highest primary production and most intense denitrification are geographically separated in the northern Indian Ocean. This decoupling was also shown to be reflected by respiration rates that were found to be maximal within the OMZ, and also too high to be supported by organic matter supplied by particles sinking from the surface layer. These results clearly point to additional modes of organic matter supply, including in situ chemoautotrophic production, within the OMZ. The denitrifying layer was also demonstrated to contain maxima in bacterial abundance and turbidity. Naqvi and colleagues also generated the first comprehensive data set on natural abundance of isotopes in various dissolved nitrogen species from any oceanic area that provided new insights into marine nitrogen cycling. Further, their work showed that, contrary to the prevalent belief, the Arabian Sea OMZ is ventilated surprisingly rapidly (on time scales of a few years at most). These results imply that the Arabian Sea is highly vulnerable to potential anthropogenic perturbations.

As a part of his pioneering efforts to investigate the impacts of global change on marine bio-geochemistry of the northern Indian Ocean, Naqvi carried out extensive work on greenhouse gases [carbon dioxide (CO_{2}), nitrous oxide (N2O) and methane (CH_{4})] both in the open-ocean and seasonally-occurring coastal hypoxic zone. The coastal low-oxygen zone, the largest of its kind in the world, has been found to have intensified in recent years, affecting living resources and providing feedback to global change. The former is because denitrification removes all nitrate, at rates that are the highest ever measured from any marine system, culminating in sulphidic conditions, and the latter is due to unprecedented accumulation of N_{2}O. Thus, it has been shown for the first time that human activities are causing an increase in oceanic emissions of N_{2}O, and the efflux of this potent greenhouse gas from the Arabian Sea is globally significant, unlike those of CO_{2} and CH_{4}.

Biological productivity in the ocean is sometimes limited by low concentration of iron. This phenomenon, widely prevalent in the Southern Ocean and equatorial Pacific, has been discovered for the first time in the western Arabian Sea, significantly affecting regional biogeochemistry, including the anomalous location of the OMZ. It has been proposed that addition of iron to the HNLC waters could promote biological production causing a drawdown of atmospheric CO_{2}. Consequently, ocean iron fertilization (OIF) has been widely regarded as a potential technique to sequester CO_{2} from the atmosphere. Naqvi organized the largest OIF experiment conducted so far – called the LOHAFEX – in the Southern Ocean, which yielded quite different results from those of previous studies. In the absence of diatoms, due to silicon deficiency in the study area, intense grazing of smaller phytoplankton by zooplankton prevented large build-up of phytoplankton biomass and carbon export to the deep sea. The LOHAFEX findings imply a much lower than expected potential of OIF for sequestration of atmospheric CO_{2}.

Naqvi initiated the first systematic study of freshwater ecosystems of India (groundwaters, natural lakes and man-made reservoirs). Observations in a large number of dams revealed relatively moderate eutrophication, with anoxic conditions prevailing in the lypolimnia during summer stratification with an apparent loss of fixed nitrogen in most reservoirs. Mechanisms and rates of this loss have been determined. More importantly, it has been demonstrated that methane emissions from Indian dams, previously postulated to be the highest in the world, are much smaller.

Naqvi provided a nucleus for the formation of a bio-geochemistry group in NIO that over the years has developed to be among the best in the world. In this process he also set up numerous state-of-the-art analytical facilities and developed expertise, many of which are not available anywhere in the country. He guided and trained a large number of youngsters who are occupying high positions in academic and research institutions both in India and abroad. He also led numerous research projects. He participated in over 50 research expeditions, being the chief scientist of over half of them, including LOHAFEX. He was also a member of the Third Indian Expedition to Antarctica that set up the first permanent station at the icy continent. Naqvi has extensively traveled abroad delivering invited talks at a large number of institutions and conferences. He has worked at the following institutions: Lamont–Doherty Earth Observatory of Columbia University, New York, USA (as a Raman Research Fellow); Institute for Hydrospheric-Atmospheric Sciences, Nagoya University, Japan (as a visiting professor); Centre for Tropical Marine Ecology, Bremen, Germany (as a Hanse Wissenschaftskolleg Fellow); Max-Planck Institute for Marine Microbiology, Bremen (as a Marie Curie Fellow), and KISR, Salmiya, Kuwait. He was an Adjunct Scientist at Woods Hole Oceanographic Institution, Woods Hole, US, from 2007 to 2017.

Naqvi served on a very large number of national and international committees, including United Nations panels and organizing committees of many international conferences. He has been actively involved with planning and implementation of several ocean-related projects of International Geosphere-Biosphere Programme (IGBP) and Scientific Committee on Ocean Research (SCOR). He was a member of the executive committee and several working groups of SCOR. He has also been engaged in editing of international journals, serving on editorial boards of Indian Journal of Marine Sciences, 'Marine Biology and Aquatic Biology, and an executive editor of Biogeosciences.

In recognition of his scientific contributions, Naqvi has received a large number of awards/recognitions, including the CSIR Young Scientist Award (1987), MAAS Young Scientist Award (1989), Shanti Swaroop Bhatnagar Prize (1996), Vigyan Ratna by the Uttar Pradesh Government (2004), National Award for Ocean Science & Technology by the Ministry of Earth Sciences, Government of India (2013), PSN National Award for Excellence in Science & Technology, HN Siddiquie medal by the Indian Geophysical Union (2014), Sisir Kumar Mitra Memorial Award by the Indian National Science Academy (INSA) (2015), and National Geosciences Award for Excellence (2018) by the Ministry of Mines, Government of India. He is a fellow of the National Academy of Sciences, India, Indian Academy of Sciences, Indian National Science Academy, and Third World Academy of Sciences. He has also been selected as a Geochemistry Fellow by the Geochemical Society (USA) and the European Association of Geochemistry in 2020. He was awarded the Vigyan Shri Award under Rashtriya Vigyan Puraskar scheme in 2024.
