= Haida Salmon Restoration Corporation =

Canadian First Nations company

The Haida Salmon Restoration Corporation (HSRC) is a Vancouver-based company formerly run by Russ George and funded by the Old Massett band of Haida Gwaii. The company conducted a small scale ocean fertilization experiment in 2012.

120 tons of iron compound were deposited in the migration routes of pink and sockeye salmon in the Pacific ocean West of Haida Gwaii over a period of 30 days. The project resulted in a 35,000 km^{2} (14,000 sq mi) plankton bloom that lasted for several months and was confirmed by NASA satellite imagery. The HSRC scientific team collected a significant amount of oceanographic data using autonomous underwater vehicles (Slocum Gliders), Argo Drifters, Multi-Spectral Sonar, Surface Seawater samples, Phytoplankton Tows and other methods.

The experiment, which was carried out without the knowledge of national authorities, was later described by a leading scientist at the Natural History Museum in London as "hav(ing) had a chilling effect on public trust and on research". In May, 2013, HSRC fired George, removing him as a director of the company, and appointed John Disney as interim CEO.

On 15 July 2014, the oceanographic scientific data gathered during the project was made publicly available under the ODbL license.
