= Russ George =

American businessman and entrepreneur

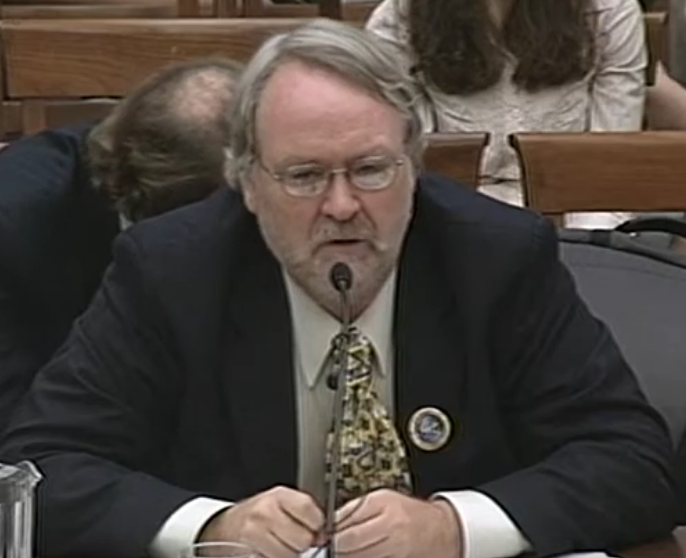
- George in 2007
- Born: 6 December 1949 (age 76)
- Occupations: businessman, entrepreneur
- Known for: President CEO Founder Planktos Inc. and Planktos Corp., Founder managing director KlimaFa, Founder Haida Climate
- Website: russgeorge.net

Russ George (Darcy Russel George; born 6 December 1949) is an American businessman and entrepreneur best known for founding the San Francisco–based firm Planktos Inc. which claims to "restore ecosystems and slow climate change". In 2007 he provided testimony to the House Select Committee on Energy Independence and Global Warming. The ecorestoration treeplanting company he founded in Canada in 1973 originally called Coast Range has planted upwards of 250 million trees. In the 90s, he founded several companies conducting cold fusion research.

He used to be member of Greenpeace and was part of the crew of the Rainbow Warrior, though by 2012 he and Greenpeace were adversarial. He has attracted media attention for his company's large-scale geoengineering experiments; the first, an attempt to perform an iron-fertilization project off the coast of the Galapagos Islands in 2007, was stopped by governments and environmentalists. A UN moratorium on iron fertilization was passed as a result. In 2012, he dumped 100 tonnes of iron-rich dust into the ocean of British Columbia through the company Haida Salmon Restoration Corporation, resulting in a government investigation.

== Career ==
=== Cold fusion and ventures ===
In the late 1980s, Russell embraced the idea of near limitless energy from the fusion of atoms after hearing of the Fleischmann–Pons experiment.

Shortly after, in 1989, Darcy Russ George and Ronald A. Brightsen founded Clustron Science Corp. in Order to conduct experiments regarding cold fusion.

In 1998, Russ George founded Saturna Technologies and eWorld Travel Corp. an Internet Travel Service Company, which was renamed to GYK Ventures Inc. in 2002, then renamed a second time to Diatom Corp. in 2005.

In March 2005, he incorporated a company named D2Fusion Inc. which would supposedly produce and sell fusion-powered heating devices.

He founded the San Francisco–based firm Planktos Inc. which claims to "restore ecosystems and slow climate change".

In August 2005, George sold Planktos Inc. and D2Fusion Inc. to a Vancouver-based company named Solar Energy Ltd. for a stated value of $1.5 million and $2 million respectively.

In 2007 he provided testimony to the House Select Committee on Energy Independence and Global Warming.

=== Planktos iron dissolving attempt (2007) ===
After Solar purchased Planktos Inc. from George in 2005, it sold it another company named Diatom Corp., with Planktos renamed to Planktos Corp. to reflect this acquisition. The name change became effective March 7, 2007. In May 2007, Planktos Corp. announced their plans to dissolve 100 tons of iron over a 10 000 square kilometer area on the high seas near the Galápagos Islands, the first of six planned large-scale operations Planktos was planning to conduct in the Atlantic and Pacific Ocean from 2007 to 2009. The intent was to profit by fertilizing the ocean with iron dust, creating blooms of phytoplankton that in theory would absorb carbon dioxide. The business plan was then to sell carbon offset credits to other companies. These plans caught the attention of the several NGOs, the first of which was the eco-justice ETC Group, which raised alarm about the large-scale geoengineering project. This in turn caused other organizations to take notice of Planktos Corp. In the middle of June 2007, Sea Shepherd UK published a statement that one of their vessels would be able to monitor movements of any Planktos vessels and intercept them if necessary. The organization also stated that they were investigating the possibility of criminal charges against Planktos Inc.

The start of the operation was delayed by almost three months due to supply delays, but finally, on November 5, 2007, the Planktos-owned, US-registered vessel Weatherbird II set sail, departing from Fort Lauderdale for an unknown location.

Unbeknownst to the organizations attempting to put a halt to these operations, a change of plans had taken place, and instead of heading for Galápagos, the vessel set course on the Bermudas for a refueling stop, intending to cruise across the Atlantic and conduct the operation near the Canary Islands instead in order to avoid confrontation with the Sea Shepherds. Much to the surprise of Sea Shepherds, on November 14, 2007, the vessel appeared in the harbor of St. Georges, where it refueled as planned. At this point, the vessel had no iron dust aboard, with Planktos attempting to obtain the required iron for the experiment dust from ground-up metal scrap instead, contradicting earlier claims of using virgin iron dust in the experiment as well as leading to concerns whether the iron used would be contaminated by oils or impurities. Two days later, the vessel departed for the Canary Islands. The vessel was denied port entry in the Canary Islands by local authorities in December 2007, after which the vessel spent several days drifting about before heading northwards to the island of Madeira. Several days later, the company announced to wind down its business due to “unanticipated events in the Canary Islands”.

On February 13, 2008, the company announced that funds had run dry and all operations were being postponed indefinitely. In March, the Weatherbird II was sold to an oil exploration interest.

A UN moratorium on iron fertilization was passed as a result of the attempted experiment.[6]

=== Haida Salmon Restoration Corporation experiment (2012) ===
George was CEO and chief scientist of the Haida Salmon Restoration Corporation (HSRC), which was formed when the Haida village of Old Massett invested $2.5 million to initiate an iron-fertilization project to boost local salmon populations.

==== Iron dumping ====
According to Wired, in July 2012, "a renegade American businessman," George, "decided to trigger an algae bloom to absorb some carbon dioxide from the atmosphere—an attempt at geoengineering, a tech-based approach to combating climate change." Wired called it "the largest known geoengineering experiment at the time." In 2012, the Haida Salmon Restoration Corporation decided on conducting an 'ocean pasture restoration experiment' by spreading more than 100 tonnes of an iron-rich dirt-like substance over a large area in the Pacific Ocean. Russel George was chosen to act as the lead scientist of this operation.

In July 2012, George departed from Victoria with a crew of 11 on a chartered fishing vessel named the Ocean Pearl, loaded with 100 tons of iron-rich nutrient. The vessel exited the Strait of Juan de Fuca and headed northwards into the Gulf of Alaska until they reached the currents known as the Haida Eddies, approximately 200 miles westward of the coast of Haida Gwaii. The crew spent the next weeks zigzagging the ship over the ocean while mixing the 4 000 50-lb bags of nutrients with seawater and pumping them overboard using a hose before returning to Victoria to take 20 more tons of nutrient aboard to repeat the process in August. As of 2022, this remains by far the largest Iron fertilization operation in history. George claimed this resulted in increased growth of phytoplankton over 10,000 square miles.

==== Responses and legality ====
Some critics asserted George's actions were illegal while others have argued that they were not. Scientists were especially concerned regarding the fact that previous similar experiments, like the EisenEx experiment conducted in November 2009, had shown that fertilizing the ocean with iron in this manner would especially promote the growth of a genus of microalgae known as Pseudo-nitzschia, which in turn produces large quantities of domoic acid, a potentially deadly neurotoxin which accumulates through the food chain. The Canadian Food Inspection Agency reported a significant increase in concentrations of Domoic acid on the northern coast of Haida Gwaii in the latter half of 2012, and citizens of Old Masset reported with unease that the island was hit by the strongest red tides ever seen there. In a blog post, Victor Smetacek of the Alfred Wegener Institute for Polar and Marine Research in Germany, who has done 'ocean pasture restoration' (OPR) experiments, called claims that OPR experiments "may cause harmful algal blooms (HABs)" unfounded, and wrote that a National Academy of Sciences report said OPR would not induce harmful algal blooms in the deep ocean.

Critics alleged violations of the United Nations Convention on Biological Diversity (CBD) and the London Convention on the Dumping of Wastes at Sea which contain moratoriums on geoengineering experiments. Parties to the London Convention and London Protocol expressed grave concerns about this experiment. Proponents argued that the experiments were not technically illegal, with Romany M. Webb noting that the CBD's resolution was not legally binding, nor was a then upcoming amendment about OPR to the London Protocol. Edward Parson of the Emmett Institute on Climate Change and the Environment argued the Haida project did not violate international law, as CBD decisions regarding CBD were purely advisory.

John Disney, president of the Haida Salmon Restoration Corporation, stated in a press conference on October 19, 2012 that the company had "complied with every necessary aspect of the ocean governance before undertaking the work," and that it did "not consider micronutrient replenishment of a naturally occurring substance to be pollution. We are using this for restoration purposes, to restore the salmon back to their rightful place in the Old Massey economy." He also defended George's role as chief scientist, stating that "we approached him" for the role and that the company trusted his science and intent.

==== Investigation and lawsuit ====
In March 2013, search warrants were executed by Environment Canada's enforcement branch to investigate Russ George's office concerning the 2012 iron enrichment test. In May 2013, the Haida Salmon Restoration Corporation removed George as a director of the company and ended his employment. Russ George sued the Haida Salmon Restoration Corporation, its directors, and several others in 2014. In a counterclaim the Haida Salmon Restoration Corporation claimed that Russ George lied about his credentials and academic qualifications, assaulted the project leader, and acted in an "irrational, unprofessional and offensive manner". In 2016, Russ George was ordered to pay security for legal costs.

==== Experiment results ====
On July 15, 2014, the oceanographic scientific data gathered during the project was made publicly available under the ODbL license. The experiment did result in an unusually large phytoplankton bloom that lasted at least until September 2012, when it became increasingly difficult to detect as the biomass dispersed into the surrounding waters. In the seas of Southeast Alaska, the relevant area of the experiment, the expected catch of Pink Salmon in 2013 was predicted by salmon experts and managers to be 54 million fish. The catch turned out to be 224 million Pinks, the largest catch in Canadian history. George has claimed this proves the experiment's success, despite claims that no definitive link between the experiment and the higher levels of the food chain (including salmon) could be determined. Research conducted on 13 major iron-fertilization experiments in the open ocean since 1990 determined that the method is unproven; with respect to the Haida Gwaii project, "scientists have seen no evidence that the experiment worked", concluded a 2017 article in Nature.
