= Ocean fertilization =

Provision of nutrients to the upper layers of the oceans

CO_{2} sequestration in the ocean

Ocean fertilization or ocean nourishment refers to both natural and intentional processes that replenish iron and other nutrients in the upper ocean, which in turn stimulate the growth of phytoplankton and in some circumstances draw down large amounts of carbon dioxide (CO_{2}) through photosynthesis. Intentional ocean fertilization is biomimicry of natural processes that have removed atmospheric CO_{2} before ice ages as well as after volcanic eruptions, whale defecation, and near hydrothermal vents. The introduction of nutrients to the upper ocean increases marine food production as well as removing carbon dioxide from the atmosphere.

A number of techniques, including fertilization by the micronutrient iron (called "ocean iron fertilization" or OIF) or with nitrogen and phosphorus (both macronutrients), have been proposed. A NOAA special report rated OIF as having "a moderate potential for cost, scalability and how long carbon might be stored compared to other marine sequestration ideas."

Ocean iron fertilization can stimulate photosynthesis in phytoplankton. The phytoplankton converts the ocean's dissolved carbon dioxide into carbohydrate, some of which has been shown to sink into the deeper ocean. More than a dozen open-sea experiments confirmed that adding iron to the ocean increases photosynthesis in phytoplankton by up to 30 times.

OIF is one of the more well-researched carbon dioxide removal (CDR) approaches, and supported by climate restoration proponents. Critics cite uncertainty about this approach regarding the duration of the effective oceanic carbon sequestration. But a landmark field trial found that, more than half the phytoplankton biomass sank below 1,000 meters, where it is likely to remain sequestered for hundreds or thousands of years. The National Academies of Science, Engineering and Medicine (NASEM) 2021 study on marine CDR (mCDR) concludes that OIF has among the highest potential of mCDR approaches.

The report indicates that there is medium-high confidence that the technique could be efficient and scalable at low cost, with medium environmental risks. "This biotic approach has relatively high scalability and low costs for deployment, though challenges would include verifiable C accounting and, as for most ocean CDR at scale, careful monitoring of intended and unexpected ecological effects up and down the food chain."

Peter Fiekowsky and Carole Douglis write, "I consider iron fertilization an important item on our list of potential climate restoration solutions. Given the fact that iron fertilization is a natural process that has taken place on a massive scale for millions of years, it is likely that most of the side effects are familiar ones that pose no major threat."

== Rationale ==
The marine food chain is based on photosynthesis by marine phytoplankton that combine carbon with inorganic nutrients to produce organic matter. Production is limited by the availability of nutrients, most commonly nitrogen or iron. Numerous experiments have demonstrated how iron fertilization can increase phytoplankton productivity. Nitrogen is a limiting nutrient over much of the ocean and can be supplied from various sources, including fixation by cyanobacteria. Carbon-to-iron ratios in phytoplankton are much larger than carbon-to-nitrogen or carbon-to-phosphorus ratios, so iron has the highest potential for sequestration per unit mass added.

Oceanic carbon naturally cycles between the surface and the deep via two "pumps" of similar scale. The "solubility" pump is driven by ocean circulation and the solubility of CO_{2} in seawater. The "biological" pump is driven by phytoplankton and subsequent settling of detrital particles or dispersion of dissolved organic carbon. The former has increased as a result of increasing atmospheric CO_{2} concentration. This CO_{2} sink is estimated to be approximately 2 GtC/yr.

The global phytoplankton population fell about 40 percent between 1950 and 2008 or about 1 percent per year. The most notable declines took place in polar waters and in the tropics. The decline is attributed to sea surface temperature increases. A separate study found that diatoms, the largest type of phytoplankton, declined more than 1 percent per year from 1998 to 2012, particularly in the North Pacific, North Indian and Equatorial Indian oceans. The decline appears to reduce pytoplankton's ability to sequester carbon in the deep ocean.

Fertilization offers the prospect of both reducing the concentration of atmospheric greenhouse gases with the aim of slowing climate change and at the same time increasing fish stocks via increasing primary production. The reduction reduces the ocean's rate of carbon sequestration in the deep ocean.

Each area of the ocean has a base sequestration rate on some timescale, e.g., annual. Fertilization must increase that rate, but must do so on a scale beyond the natural scale. Otherwise, fertilization changes the timing, but not the total amount sequestered. However, accelerated timing may have beneficial effects for primary production separate from those from sequestration.

Biomass production inherently depletes all resources (save for sun and water). Either they must all be subject to fertilization or sequestration will eventually be limited by the one mostly slowly replenished (after some number of cycles) unless the ultimate limiting resource is sunlight and/or surface area. Generally, phosphate is the ultimate limiting nutrient. As oceanic phosphorus is depleted (via sequestration) it would have to be included in the fertilization cocktail supplied from terrestrial sources.

== Approaches ==
Phytoplankton require a variety of nutrients. These include macronutrients such as nitrate and phosphate (in relatively high concentrations) and micronutrients such as iron and zinc (in much smaller quantities). Nutrient requirements vary across phylogenetic groups (e.g., diatoms require silicon) but may not individually limit total biomass production. Co-limitation (among multiple nutrients) may also mean that one nutrient can partially compensate for a shortage of another. Silicon does not affect total production, but can change the timing and community structure with follow-on effects on remineralization times and subsequent mesopelagic nutrient vertical distribution.

High-nutrient, low-chlorophyll (HNLC) waters occupy the oceans' subtropical gyre systems, approximately 40 per cent of the surface, where wind-driven downwelling and a strong thermocline impede nutrient resupply from deeper water. Nitrogen fixation by cyanobacteria provides a major source of N. In effect, it ultimately prevents the ocean from losing the N required for photosynthesis. Phosphorus has no substantial supply route, making it the ultimate limiting macronutrient. The sources that fuel primary production are deep water stocks and runoff or dust-based.

=== Iron ===
Iron fertilization refers to both natural and intentional processes that replenish iron in the upper ocean. Iron can stimulate the growth of phytoplankton, which remove carbon dioxide (CO_{2}) from the atmosphere through photosynthesis. Phytoplankton are the primary producers that feed the rest of the marine food web.

Natural iron distribution by dust storms, volcanic eruptions, hydrothermal vents, upwelling, and whale defecation can all prompt large blooms of phytoplankton and restore local marine life. Plankton photosynthesis can remove large amounts of carbon dioxide (CO_{2}) from the atmosphere and in some circumstances sequester it long term. Natural iron fertilization is accepted as a major force behind the significant drop in CO2 and temperatures that lead to ice ages.

=== Phosphorus ===
In the very long term, phosphorus "is often considered to be the ultimate limiting macronutrient in marine ecosystems" and has a slow natural cycle. Where phosphate is the limiting nutrient in the photic zone, addition of phosphate is expected to increase primary phytoplankton production. This technique can give 0.83 W/m^{2} of globally averaged negative forcing, which is sufficient to reverse the warming effect of about half the current levels of anthropogenic CO_{2} emissions. One water-soluble fertilizer is diammonium phosphate (DAP), (NH_{4})_{2}HPO_{4}, that as of 2008 had a market price of 1700/tonne−1 of phosphorus. Using that price and the C : P Redfield ratio of 106 : 1 produces a sequestration cost (excluding preparation and injection costs) of some $45 /tonne of carbon (2008), substantially less than the trading price for carbon emissions.

=== Nitrogen (urea) ===
This technique proposes to fertilize the ocean with urea, a nitrogen rich substance, to encourage phytoplankton growth. Concentrations of macronutrients per area of ocean surface would be similar to large natural upwellings. Once exported from the surface, the carbon remains sequestered for a long time.

An Australian company, Ocean Nourishment Corporation (ONC), planned to inject hundreds of tonnes of urea into the ocean, in order to boost the growth of CO_{2}-absorbing phytoplankton, as a way to combat climate change. In 2007, Sydney-based ONC completed an experiment involving one tonne of nitrogen in the Sulu Sea off the Philippines. This project was criticized by many institutions, including the European Commission, due to lack of knowledge of side effects on the marine ecosystem.

Macronutrient nourishment can give 0.38 W/m^{2} of globally averaged negative forcing, which is sufficient to reverse the warming effect of current levels of around a quarter of anthropogenic CO_{2} emissions.

The two dominant costs are manufacturing the nitrogen and nutrient delivery.

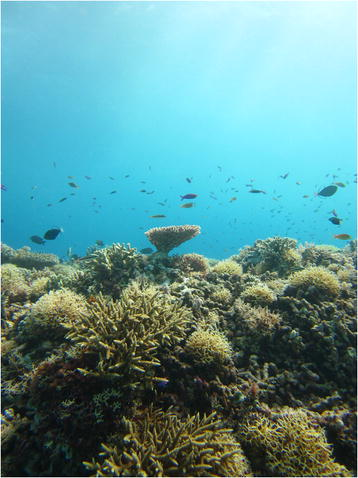
According to Ramsay et al., urea fertilization could cause damage to the rich marine biodiversity of the Sulu sea (including its coral reefs).

In waters with sufficient iron micro nutrients, but a deficit of nitrogen, urea fertilization is the better choice for algae growth. Urea is the most used fertilizer in the world, due to its high content of nitrogen, low cost and high reactivity towards water. When exposed to ocean waters, urea is metabolized by phytoplankton via urease enzymes to produce ammonia.

$\ce{CO(NH_2)_2 + H_2O ->[urease] NH_3 + NH_2COOH}$

$\ce{NH_2COOH + H_2O -> NH_3 + H_2CO_3}$

The intermediate product carbamate also reacts with water to produce a total of two ammonia molecules.

Another cause of concern is the sheer amount of urea needed to capture the same amount of carbon as eq. iron fertilization. The nitrogen to iron ratio in a typical algae cell is 16:0.0001, meaning that for every iron atom added to the ocean a substantial larger amount of carbon is captured compared to adding one atom of nitrogen. Scientists also emphasize that adding urea to ocean waters could reduce oxygen content and result in a rise of toxic marine algae. This could potentially have devastating effects on fish populations, which others argue would be benefiting from the urea fertilization (the argument being that fish populations would feed on healthy phytoplankton).

=== Pelagic pumping ===
Local wave power could be used to pump nutrient-rich water from hundred- metre-plus depths to the euphotic zone. However, deep water concentrations of dissolved CO_{2} could be returned to the atmosphere.

The supply of DIC in upwelled water is generally sufficient for photosynthesis permitted by upwelled nutrients, without requiring atmospheric CO_{2}. Second-order effects include how the composition of upwelled water differs from that of settling particles. More nitrogen than carbon is remineralized from sinking organic material. Upwelling of this water allows more carbon to sink than that in the upwelled water, which would make room for at least some atmospheric CO_{2} to be absorbed. the magnitude of this difference is unclear. No comprehensive studies have yet resolved this question. Preliminary calculations using upper limit assumptions indicate a low value. 1,000 square kilometres (390 sq mi) could sequester 1 gigatonne/year.

Sequestration thus depends on the upward flux and the rate of lateral surface mixing of the surface water with denser pumped water.

=== Volcanic ash ===
Volcanic ash adds nutrients to the surface ocean. This is most apparent in nutrient-limited areas. Research on the effects of anthropogenic and aeolian iron addition to the ocean surface suggests that nutrient-limited areas benefit most from a combination of nutrients provided by anthropogenic, eolian and volcanic deposition. Some oceanic areas are comparably limited in more than one nutrient, so fertilization regimes that includes all limited nutrients is more likely to succeed. Volcanic ash supplies multiple nutrients to the system, but excess metal ions can be harmful.

Clear evidence documents that ash can be as much as 45 percent by weight in some deep marine sediments. In the Pacific Ocean estimates claim that (on a millennial-scale) the atmospheric deposition of air-fall volcanic ash was as high as the deposition of desert dust. This indicates the potential of volcanic ash as a significant iron source.

In August 2008 the Kasatochi volcanic eruption in the Aleutian Islands, Alaska, deposited ash in the nutrient-limited northeast Pacific. This ash (including iron) resulted in one of the largest phytoplankton blooms observed in the subarctic. Fisheries scientists in Canada linked increased oceanic productivity from the volcanic iron to subsequent record returns of salmon in the Fraser River two years later

=== Monitored nutrients ===
The approach advocated by Ocean Nutrition Corporation is to limit the distribution of added nutrients to allow phytoplankton concentrations to rise only to the values seen in upwelling regions (5–10 mg Chl/m^{3}). Maintaining healthy phytoplankton levels is claimed to avoid harmful algal blooms and oxygen depletion. Chlorophyll concentration is an easily measured proxy for phytoplankton concentration. The company stated that values of approximately 4 mg Chl/m^{3} meet this requirement.

== Complications ==
While manipulation of the land ecosystem in support of agriculture for the benefit of humans has long been accepted (despite its side effects), directly enhancing ocean productivity has received pushback.

=== Outright opposition ===
In 2007, Lisa Speer of the Natural Resources Defense Council, wrote "There is a limited amount of money, of time, that we have to deal with this problem....The worst possible thing we could do for climate change technologies would be to invest in something that doesn't work and that has big impacts that we don't anticipate."

In 2009 Aaron Strong, Sallie Chisholm, Charles Miller and John Cullen opined in Nature "...fertilizing the oceans with iron to stimulate phytoplankton blooms, absorb carbon dioxide from the atmosphere and export carbon to the deep sea – should be abandoned."

Recently, though, interest in OIF is showing a resurgence. The 2021 National Academies of Sciences, Engineering, and Medicine report on ocean-based carbon dioxide removal concluded that OIF has among the highest potential of marine CDR approaches, with medium-high confidence in its scalability and relatively low costs. In Science, Warren Cornwall mentions "Tests have shown the iron does stimulate plankton growth. But key questions remain, says Dave Siegel, a marine scientist at the University of California, Santa Barbara, who served on the NASEM panel. How much of the absorbed carbon makes it to the deepocean is uncertain."

=== Efficiency ===
Algal cell chemical composition is often assumed to respect a ratio where atoms are 106 carbon: 16 nitrogen: 1 phosphorus (Redfield ratio): 0.0001 iron. Thus, each atom of iron in an iron-constrained environment helps capture 1,060,000 atoms of carbon, while a nitrogen atom in a nitrogen-constrained environment would only capture 6. In large areas of the ocean, such organic growth (and hence nitrogen fixation) is thought to be limited by the lack of iron rather than nitrogen, although direct measures are hard.

On the other hand, experimental iron fertilisation in HNLC regions has been supplied with excess iron which cannot be utilized before it is scavenged. Thus the organic material produced was much less than if the ratio of nutrients above were achieved. Only a fraction of the available nitrogen (because of iron scavenging) is drawn down. In culture bottle studies of oligotrophic water, adding nitrogen and phosphorus can draw down considerably more nitrogen per dosing. The export production is only a small percentage of the new primary production and in the case of iron fertilization, iron scavenging means that regenerative production is small. With macronutrient fertilisation, regenerative production is expected to be large and supportive of larger total export. Other losses can also reduce efficiency.

In addition, the efficiency of carbon sequestration through ocean fertilisation is heavily influenced by factors such as changes in stoichiometric ratios and gas exchange make accurately predicting the effectiveness of ocean feralization projects.

Depending on where and how it is applied, fertilisation may or may not create a permanent carbon sink. Early modeling led some to conclude that "Ocean fertilisation options are only worthwhile if sustained on a millennial timescale and phosphorus addition may have greater long-term potential than iron or nitrogen fertilisation."

However, the widely cited European Iron Fertilization Experiment (EIFEX) found that at least half the bloom biomass sank below 1,000 metres, where it will likely remain sequestered for centuries.

=== Concerns about side effects ===
==== Harmful algal blooms ====
Harmful algal blooms (HABs) are well documented—in coastal and estuarine environments, where they can cause eutrophication. They derive from excessive nutrients from agricultural runoff, wastewater discharge, and urban stormwater By definition, intentional ocean fertilization would not be performed near shore where nutrient levels are already high. The Gulf of Mexico dead zone is a prominent example of coastal HABs caused by nitrogen-rich agricultural runoff from the Mississippi River basin accumulating in shallow, semi-enclosed coastal waters.

Ocean iron fertilization, in particular, targets open, deep-ocean waters geographically remote from coastal zones. No OIF experiment or proposal has targeted coastal waters where HABs occur, and practitioners specifically avoid areas of existing nutrient enrichment.

==== Impact on fisheries ====
Adding urea to the ocean can cause phytoplankton blooms that serve as a food source for zooplankton and in turn feed for fish. This may increase fish catches. However, if cyanobacteria and dinoflagellates dominate phytoplankton assemblages that are considered poor quality food for fish then the increase in fish quantity may not be large. Some evidence links iron fertilization from volcanic eruptions to increased fisheries production. Other nutrients would be metabolized along with the added nutrient(s), reducing their presence in fertilized waters.

Krill populations have declined dramatically since whaling began. Sperm whales transport iron from the deep ocean to the surface during prey consumption and defecation. Sperm whales have been shown to increase the levels of primary production and carbon export to the deep ocean by depositing iron-rich faeces into surface waters of the Southern Ocean. The faeces causes phytoplankton to grow and take up carbon. The phytoplankton nourish krill. Reducing the abundance of sperm whales in the Southern Ocean, whaling resulted in an extra 2 million tonnes of carbon remaining in the atmosphere each year.

==== Ecosystem disruption ====
Many locations, such as the Tubbataha Reef in the Sulu Sea, support high marine biodiversity. Nitrogen or other nutrient loading in coral reef areas can lead to community shifts towards algal overgrowth of corals and ecosystem disruption, implying that fertilization must be restricted to areas in which vulnerable populations are not put at risk.

Critics of OIF in the open ocean have also expressed ecological concerns. However, while scientists call for careful ecological monitoring during field trials or implementation, no significant harmful ecological effects were observed across the 13 major OIF field experiments conducted between 1993 and 2012.

==== Cloud formation ====
Many phytoplankton species release dimethyl sulfide (DMS), which escapes into the atmosphere where it forms sulfate aerosols and encourages cloud formation, which could reduce warming. Some global climate model simulations show that substantial increases in DMS could reduce global rainfall, while halving temperature increases as of 2100.

== International governance ==
Ocean iron fertilization is frequently characterized as subject to an international moratorium; however the governance framework permits scientific research under a formal assessment and permitting process. The two applicable international frameworks — the London Convention/London Protocol (LC/LP) system and the Convention on Biological Diversity (CBD) — both explicitly preserve space for scientific research.

International governance of ocean fertilization has evolved significantly since initial concerns were raised in the mid-2000s. In June 2007, the London Dumping Convention issued a statement of concern noting 'the potential for large scale ocean iron fertilization to have negative impacts on the marine environment and human health', but did not define 'large scale'.

In 2008, the London Convention/London Protocol noted in resolution LC-LP.1 that knowledge on the effectiveness and potential environmental impacts of ocean fertilization was insufficient to justify activities other than research. This non-binding resolution stated that fertilization, other than research, "should be considered as contrary to the aims of the Convention and Protocol and do not currently qualify for any exemption from the definition of dumping". This non-binding resolution explicitly distinguished between commercial operations, which it discouraged, and scientific research, which it preserved.

In May 2008, at the Convention on Biological Diversity, 191 nations called for a ban on ocean fertilization until scientists better understand the implications. Although frequently called a moratorium, this decision is not one in any legal sense: Decisions of the Convention on Biological Diversity's Conference of the Parties (COP) are not treaties: they reflect the consensus of member governments at the time of adoption, but create no binding legal obligations. The decision also carves out an exception for scientific research — though oddly limited to "coastal waters," a restriction with little practical relevance to open-ocean fertilization research, which operates in deep offshore environments by definition.

In 2010, the Parties adopted Resolution LC-LP.2, establishing a formal Assessment Framework for Scientific Research Involving Ocean Fertilization, providing detailed guidance on how to assess research proposals including environmental assessment, risk management, and monitoring requirements.

In 2013, the London Protocol Contracting Parties adopted Resolution LP.4(8), amending the Protocol to add a new Article 6bis and Annex 4 specifically addressing marine geoengineering, including ocean fertilization. Under this framework, ocean fertilization activities may be authorized under permit if assessed as constituting legitimate scientific research; commercial deployment remains prohibited pending further evaluation. This 2013 amendment represents the current operative regulatory framework.

In August 2018, Germany banned the sale of ocean seeding as carbon sequestration system while the matter was under discussion at EU and EASAC levels In December 2018, Germany incorporated the London Protocol's 2013 marine geoengineering framework (Resolution LP.4(8)) into national law through the Hohe-See-Einbringungsgesetz (HSEG), making it one of the first countries to do so. The German regulation prohibits commercial ocean fertilization activities but explicitly permits scientific research projects under a permitting process administered by the German Environment Agency (Umweltbundesamt).

== International law ==
=== Law of the sea ===
According to United Nations Convention on the Law of the Sea (LOSC 1982), all states are obliged to take all measures necessary to prevent, reduce and control pollution of the marine environment, to prohibit the transfer of damage or hazards from one area to another and to prohibit the transformation of one type pollution to another. How this relates to fertilization is undetermined.

== Solar radiation management ==
Fertilization may create sulfate aerosols that reflect sunlight, modifying the Earth's albedo, creating a cooling effect that reduces some of the effects of climate change. Enhancing the natural sulfur cycle in the Southern Ocean by fertilizing with iron in order to enhance dimethyl sulfide production and cloud reflectivity may achieve this.

== See also ==
- Carbon dioxide sink
- Climate engineering
- Effects of climate change on oceans
- Iron fertilization
- Planetary engineering
- Soil fertilization
