= Kenneth Möllersten =

Swedish researcher

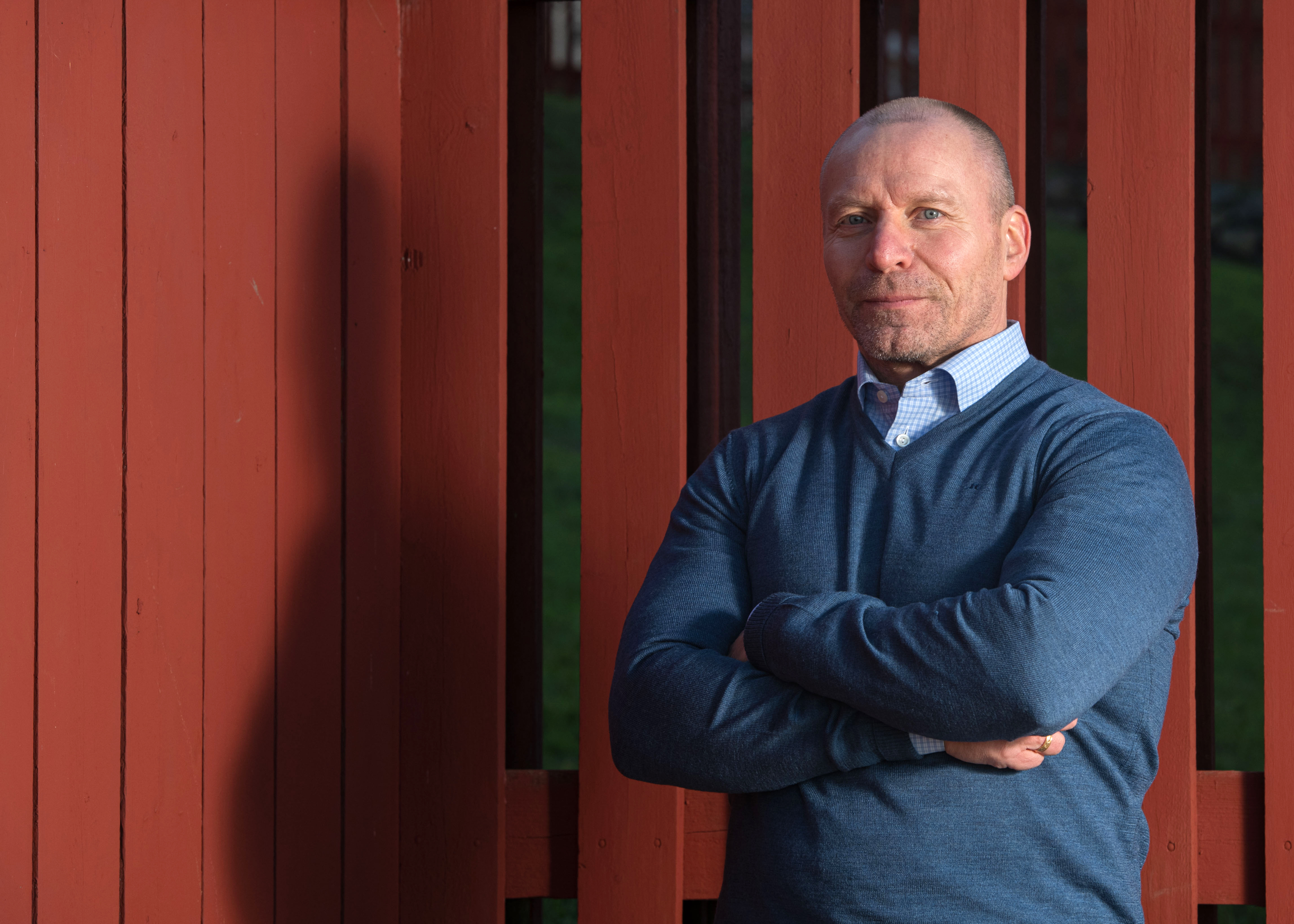
Kenneth Möllersten

Kenneth Karl Mikael Möllersten (born 6 November 1966) is a Swedish researcher. He holds a PhD in chemical engineering and an MSc in mechanical engineering, from the Royal Institute of Technology (KTH), Stockholm, Sweden and completed his postdoctoral training at the International Institute for Applied Systems Analysis (IIASA), Vienna. Möllersten is a researcher at IVL Swedish Environmental Research Institute and adjunct professor at KTH.

Möllersten made significant contributions to the early conceptualisation of the Bio-energy with carbon capture and storage (BECCS) technology and the evolution of the abstract idea of negative emissions. His work contributed to the early framing of carbon dioxide removal (CDR) as a means to achieve globally net-negative carbon dioxide (CO_{2}) emissions as part of a climate risk management strategy, suggested the potential for including negative emissions as part of an emissions trading scheme, a proposal in 2004 to use CDR to bring back atmospheric CO_{2} to pre-industrial levels, and several of the earliest studies that model the integration of BECCS in global greenhouse gas (GHG) mitigation scenarios. In 2002, Möllersten's PhD thesis introduced the concept of "carbon-negative production", expanding available options for industrial carbon management. Subsequently, Möllersten made further contributions to the early conceptual development of negative emission technologies (NETs) as one of the original proponents of biochar carbon removal.

== Selected publications ==
- Möllersten K, Yan J (2001). Economic evaluation of biomass-based energy systems with CO_{2} capture and sequestration in kraft pulp mills -The influence of the price of CO_{2} emission quota. World Resource Review 13 (4), 509-525.
- Obersteiner M, Azar Ch, Kauppi P, Möllersten K, Moreira J, Nilsson S, Read P, Riahi K, Schlamadinger B, Yamagata Y, Yan J, van Ypersele J-P (2001). Managing climate risk. Science 294 (5543):786-787.
- Möllersten K (2002). Opportunities for CO_{2} reductions and CO_{2}-lean energy systems in pulp and paper mills. Doctoral thesis, Royal Institute of Technology, Stockholm.
- Möllersten K, Yan J, Moreira JR (2003). Potential market niches for biomass energy with CO_{2} capture and storage - Opportunities for energy supply with negative CO2 emissions. Biomass and Bioenergy 25 (3):273-285.
- Möllersten K, Chladná Z, Chladný M, Obersteiner M. Negative emission biomass technologies in an uncertain climate future. In: Warnmer S F (Ed) Progress in biomass and bioenergy research, pp. 53–100. Nova Science Publishers, Inc., NY, 2006. ISBN 1-60021-328-6.
- Azar Ch, Lindgren K, Larson ED, Möllersten K (2006). Carbon capture and storage from fossil fuels and biomass – Costs and potential role in stabilising the atmosphere. Climatic Change 74 (1-3): 47–79.
- Azar Ch, Lindgren K, Obersteiner M, Riahi K, van Vuuren D, Michel K, den Elzen M, Möllersten K, Larson E (2010). The feasibility of low CO_{2} concentration targets and the role of bio-energy with carbon capture and storage (BECCS). Climatic Change 100(1):195-202.
- Möllersten K, Gao L, Yan J (2006). CO_{2} capture in pulp and paper mills: CO_{2} balances and preliminary cost assessment. Mitigation and Adaptation Strategies for Global Change 11 (5-6):1129-1150.
- Yan J, Obersteiner M, Möllersten K, Moreira J.R. (Editors) (2019). Special issue on Negative Emission Technologies. Applied Energy 255:1-3.
