= Kasatochi Island =

Active stratovolcano and part of the Andreanof Islands subgroup in Alaska

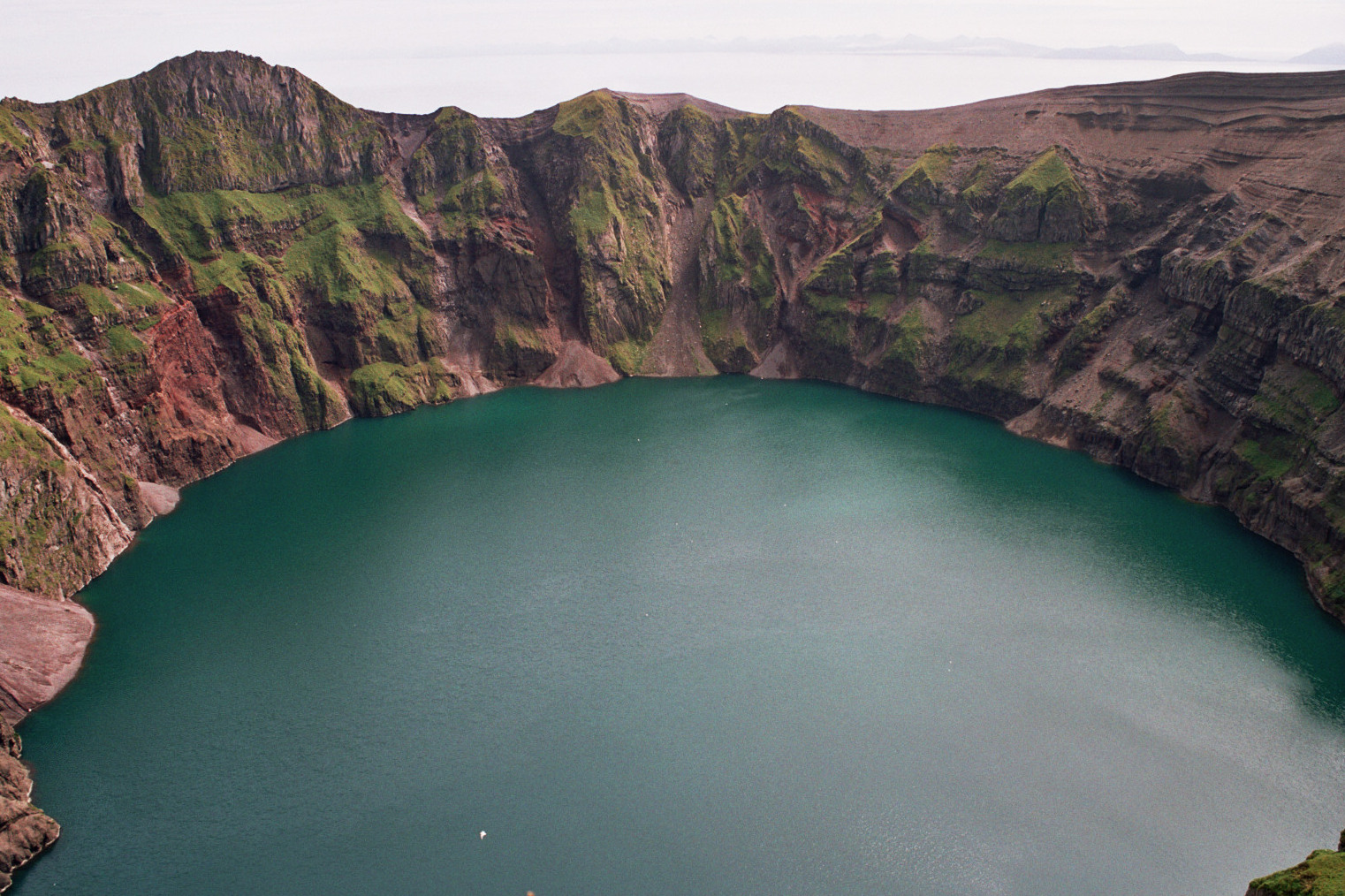
- Kasatochi volcano with crater lake before the eruption of August 7, 2008

Highest point
- Elevation: 1,030 ft (310 m)
- Prominence: 1,030 ft (310 m)
- Coordinates: 52°10′17″N 175°31′06″W

Geography
- Location within Alaska
- Location: Aleutian Islands, Alaska, United States
- Topo map: USGS Atka C-5

Geology
- Formed by: Subduction zone volcanism
- Volcanic arc: Aleutian Arc
- Last eruption: August 2008

Kasatochi Island (Aleut: Qanan-tanax̂; Russian: Касаточий остров), also known as Kasatochi volcano, is an active stratovolcano and part of the Andreanof Islands subgroup of the Aleutian Islands of southwestern Alaska. On 7 August 2008, Kasatochi began erupting explosively with an ash plume reaching 45,000 feet (14,000 m). The eruption lasted for 24 hours and destroyed most life on the island. Since the eruption, it has been the site of research on the primary succession of species back onto the island. It currently does not support any consistent human population.

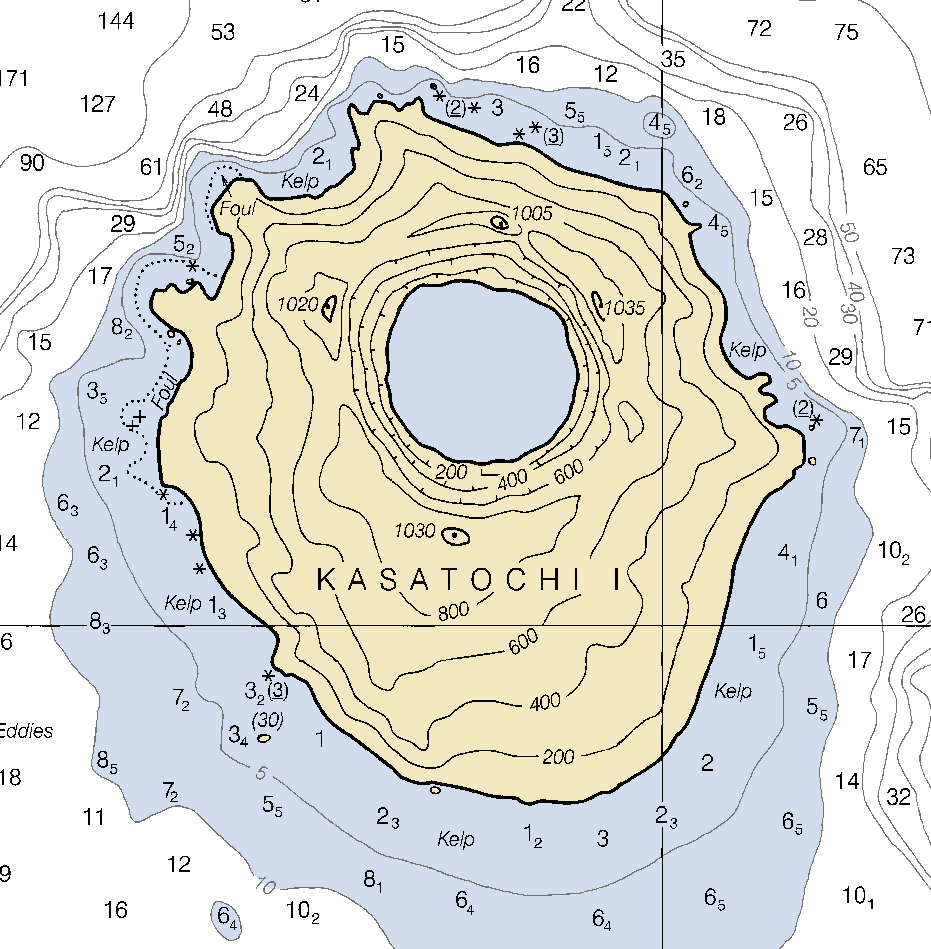
Nautical chart of Kasatochi Island

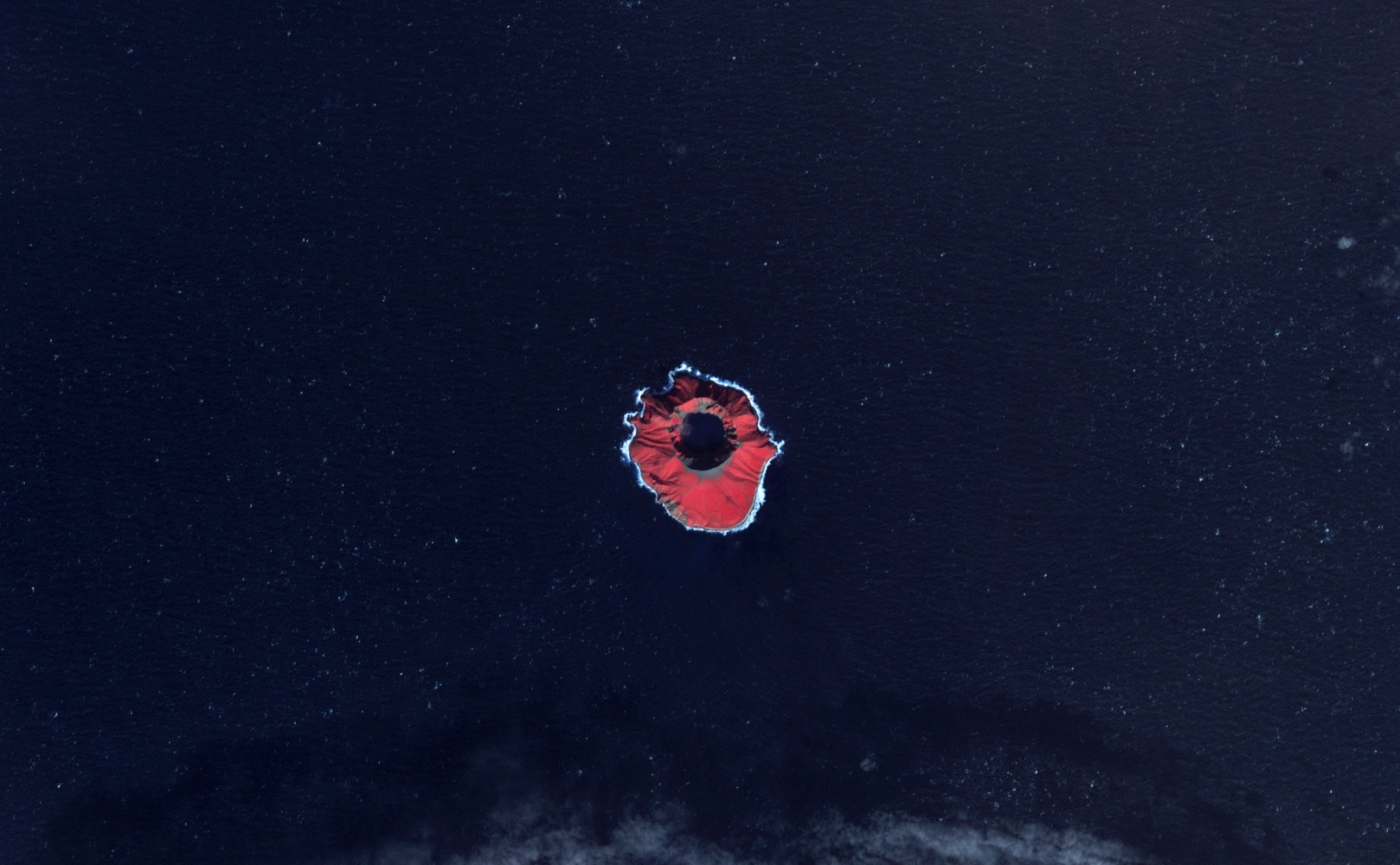
Kasatochi Island. Near-infrared, red, and green wavelengths of light. ASTER on September 23, 2003.

Kasatochi Island is a member of the Aleutian Islands, which lie above a narrow ridge that separates the Bering Sea from the North Pacific. It lies at the Atka Pass northwest of the western tip of Atka Island and east of Great Sitkin Island. It is at 52.177° N latitude and 175.508° W longitude, with a summit elevation of 314 m (1030 ft.) It has a land area of 1.9503 sq mi (5.051 km^{2}).

== Pre-2008 ecology ==
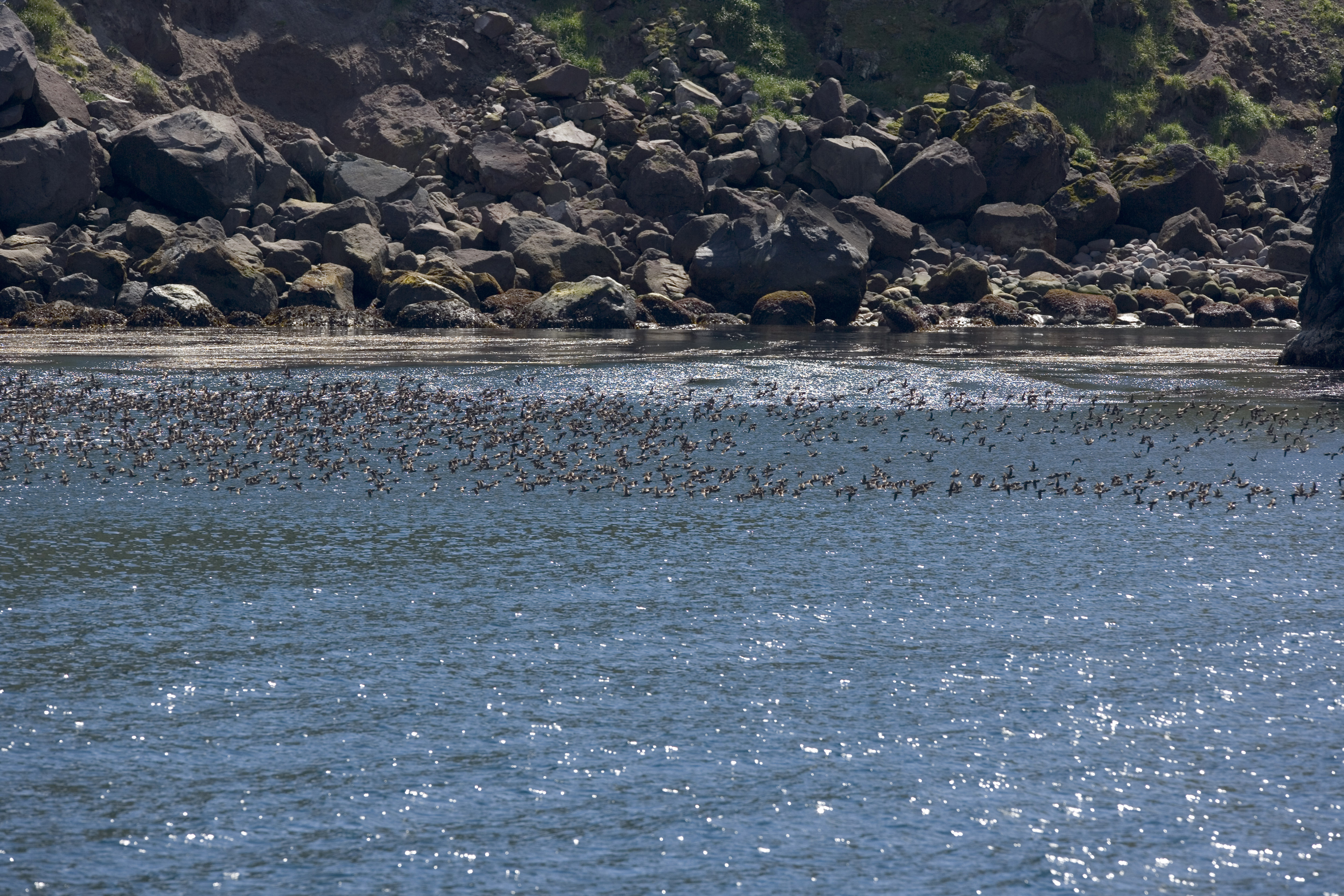
Auklet flock, Kasatochi Island

=== Geology ===
Kasatochi Island has a unique landscape that makes it an ideal home for many types of species. Some of these aspects that created such a beneficial habitat reflected strictly on the island's geology. Before 2008, the island was about 3 km in diameter and stood about 314 m high on the highest side. The island is steeper to the northern side than the southern side, and slightly north of the center of the island is a steep-walled caldera surrounding a lake. The crater is about 4,000 feet (1,200 m) in diameter, with its lake's surface lying only about 60 m above sea level. In all areas surrounding the crater, the island is characterized by steep sea-cliffs, talus slopes, and small, boulder-filled beaches. These many habitat possibilities set the stage for the numerous species that took residence there.

=== Flora ===
Before the 2008 eruption, the Kasatochi Island landscape was steep and rugged, home to dense vegetation and different species of flora. Except crater walls and sea-cliffs, nearly the entire island was vegetated with grasses and herbaceous plants. This terrestrial vegetation created the habitat for many of the species unique to Kasatochi Island. The coastal and marine habitat flourished with their own species of vegetation as well, including many different types of sea grasses, kelp, corals, sponges, and roots (namely along the rocky coasts).

=== Fauna ===
Kasatochi Island was the home of many species, but most notable were the populations of diverse seabirds, avian predators and marine invertebrates. Ocean currents, productivity, and the habitable island geology created the ideal conditions for these select groups of fauna.

The island differentiated itself from many of the others in the Aleutian chain by supporting a large diverse group of seabirds, most famously for their colony of more than 100,000 crested auklets and 150,000 least auklets, which was one of only seven colonies in the Aleutian chain. Other species included seabirds such as the Fork-tailed petrel, the whiskered auklet, the ancient murrelet, gulls, guillemots, and cormorants. These seabirds attracted many avian predators as well, such as bald eagles and peregrine falcons. The birds of Kasatochi were the dominant vertebrates on the island and the most prominent link between the terrestrial and marine ecosystems.

Many other species were on the island, including various insects, arthropods, and fish. The abundance of fish and various marine life helped support the massive influx of auklets to the island every year. It was also noted for the presence of an endangered Steller sea lion rookery on the north half of the island. Near-shore benches were carved out of lava flows that could have been dated up to hundreds of years earlier. Approximately 1000 Steller sea lions occupied these rookeries before the 2008 eruption.

== August 2008 eruption ==
Before 2008, little was known about the eruptive history or probability of future eruptions on Kasatochi Island. There were no monitoring devices on the island, but devices on two nearby islands had indicated detectable seismic activity on Kasatochi for several years. Because of the lack of necessary technology, predicting the following eruption would have been an extremely unlikely feat. Thus, it happened quite rapidly and without much warning.

On 7 August 2008, Kasatochi began erupting explosively with an ash plume maintaining an altitude of 35,000 feet and reaching 45,000 feet. The eruption lasted for 24 hours and included "two initial explosive pulses and pauses over a 6-hr period that produced ash-poor eruption clouds, a 10-hr period of continuous ash-rich emissions initiated by an explosive pulse and punctuated by two others, and a final 8-hr period of waning ash emissions." Pyroclastic flows continuously fell over the island and buried most of it in deposits ranging from decimeters to tens of meters. Before the 2008 eruption, there had been little documented activity on the island. The last confirmed activity on Kasatochi was in 1899, but that was not believed to be an eruption. Mild degassing was reported to the AVO in 2005, but that could not be confirmed.

A significant number of people were affected by the 2008 eruption, from the eruption and its secondary consequences. As the eruption became imminent, it forced the only humans on the island, two biologists from the U.S. Fish and Wildlife Service, to evacuate. Their research was stopped and later replaced with the research currently ongoing on the island. There were also nearby islands that were affected by the eruption. An ashfall advisory was issued at the time for Adak Island, a populated island in the Aleutian chain. Later, up to 6 cm of ash was found on Adak and other neighboring islands, the rest falling into the surrounding sea. At the time there were about 300 people living on the island, and while there were no immediate deaths or injuries, the long-term effects of this population being so close to the eruption are still unknown.

== Post-2008 ecology ==
=== Geology ===
The geological setting of Kasatochi was greatly impacted by the eruption. Where there had been beaches, forests, and soils once, there were now meters of deposits from the volcanic ash and flows. The area of the island as a whole was increased by about 40%. The area of the crater was increased by about 28%, and was enlarged laterally by about 300 m. The crater rim was lowered about 60 m, moving nearer to the lake below. The water level in the lake on Kasatochi significantly decreased following the eruption; however, several streams flowing out of the lower crater walls slowly refilled it. The shoreline surrounding the crater was extended hundreds of meters by pyroclastic deposits, destroying a large amount of the marine habitat that resided near the edge of the island.

=== Flora ===
All apparent life on the island appeared to be destroyed after the 2008 eruption. The pyroclastic flows and volcanic ash buried the entire island in deposits, rendering even the soil on the island almost useless. Almost all terrestrial vegetation, including grasses, trees, and herbaceous plants, was destroyed by the high temperatures before being covered, which would become one of the main problems for recolonization on land. Several auklet rookeries that were located below lava flow cliffs were buried by the deposits, along with many of the Steller sea lion rookeries as well. Boulder-filled kelp beds, an important marine habitat surrounding the island, were buried by the pyroclastic deposits that extended the island's shoreline after the eruption.

=== Fauna ===
Directly following the eruption, it was believed that there were no present surviving species on the island. The organisms were either killed or forced to flee as their habitat was destroyed around them. Nearly all of the marine and avian mammal breeding habitat was covered by volcanic ash, including the rookery on the north side of the island for the endangered Steller sea lions that previously resided there. It was not until weeks to years later that species began returning to the island. Approximately 200,000 auklets returned to the island in the summer of 2009, but as their rookeries were still covered with ash, they could not to be used for nesting. Surprisingly enough, sea lions were present on the island up to two weeks after the eruption. Their rookeries had been thickly buried as well, but coastal erosion had cleared them by the summer of 2009. Because of the intensity of this natural disturbance and the almost complete devastation of life on Kasatochi right after the eruption, the island became a textbook site for primary succession. Scientists took this opportunity and started a research project in 2009 to study ecosystem impact and long-term recovery. Their goal was to find the patterns and reasons for the returning of various species to the island. This was a rare opportunity to study this type of succession, as it is not often that data on an area exists after a disaster of this magnitude.

== Research ==
=== Purpose ===
Prior to the 2008 eruption, Kasatochi Island was a part of the Alaska Maritime National Wildlife Refuge (ANMWR). The United States Fish and Wildlife Service (USFWS), United States Geological Survey (USGS) and the National Marine Fisheries Service had studied marine birds and mammals here since 1996, where they learned much about the pre-eruption ecology of the island. The eruption in 2008 basically destroyed all signs of life on Kasatochi. This situation may have seemed similar to many other eruptions throughout history, including Surtsey in Iceland, Krakatau in Indonesia, Usu in Japan, Ksudach in Russia, and Mount St. Helens in the United States. However, the eruption of Kasatochi specifically gave scientists an extremely rare opportunity to study the primary succession of species back onto the island. This opportunity was due to the fact that rarely does such a devastating natural disaster occur in an environment where there had been extensive research on preexisting species and vegetation. By enhancing their understanding of the process on Kasatochi, they hoped to be able to apply gained knowledge to similar situations in the future.

=== Observations ===
In the summer of 2008, a team of researchers visited the island to observe and record the immediate consequences of the eruption on all present communities. The eruption had a massive effect on all aspects of the ecosystem, including soils, oceanic water, terrain, terrestrial plants, land, shore, and seabirds, arthropods, marine algae, and marine invertebrates. The goal was to recognize patterns of recolonization for each individual species and see how, if at all, they coincided with each other.

There were many apparent patterns researchers noticed after studying the recolonization efforts on Kasatochi. Erosion became noticed as a significant driving force of the redevelopment of the island ecosystem by removing deposits from the slopes. While for an extended period of time the island was considered devoid of plants, the greatest amount of plant diversity later on was found where erosion had removed new material and allowed old soil to come to the surface. In these rare places where soil was exposed, it allowed for the new growth of plants and vegetation. This in turn allowed for the reemergence of nesting sites, encouraging the return of different species of seabirds.

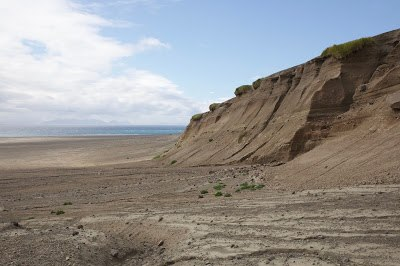
The island ten years after the eruption

Another observation in the field was the surprising existence of "legacies" (remnants of an ecosystem that escape total destruction) on Kasatochi, whose eruption was thought to have destroyed every sign of life down to its soil. This was previously not thought possible in a volcanic eruption of this magnitude. One specific example was the survival of arthropods, as most found during 2009 were either survivors of the disaster or their progeny.

One of the greater contributing factors to recolonization on Kasatochi is the different methods of dispersal. These are the methods that are planned to bring back the largest amount of species; however, the survival of these species depends on the ability of the island to stabilize its present ecosystem. At present, it is found that most immigrants (whether by wind, flight, water, etc.) fail to find suitable habitats, so while they are continually being introduced, the majority will die. These dispersal methods will lead to greater species diversity only when the terrestrial habitat stabilizes in response to abiotic and external forces.

These examples of learned patterns by monitoring how the ecosystem of Kasatochi returns to a new equilibrium and comparing the data to similar islands are helping further scientists' understanding of terrestrial-marine interactions and allowing for new knowledge of ecosystem reassembly after a natural disaster.

== See also ==
- List of volcanoes in the United States of America
