= Iron fertilization =

Ecological concept

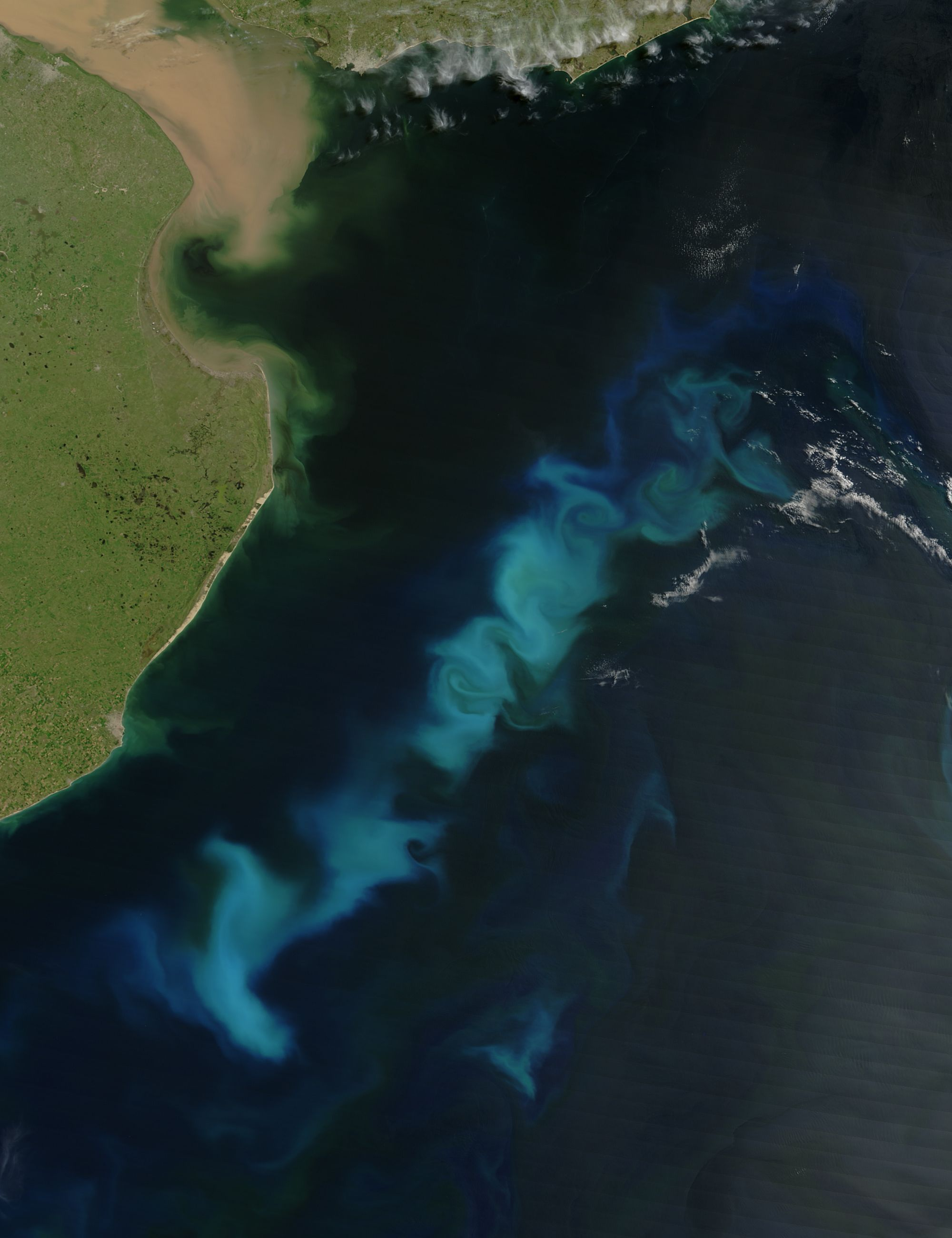
An oceanic phytoplankton bloom in the South Atlantic Ocean, off the coast of Argentina covering an area about 300 by 50 miles (500 by 80 km)

Iron fertilization refers to both natural and intentional processes that replenish iron in the upper ocean. Iron can stimulate the growth of phytoplankton, which remove carbon dioxide (CO_{2}) from the atmosphere through photosynthesis. Phytoplankton are the primary producers that feed the rest of the marine food web.

Natural iron distribution by dust storms, volcanic eruptions, hydrothermal vents, upwelling, and whale defecation can all prompt large blooms of phytoplankton and restore local marine life. Plankton photosynthesis can remove large amounts of carbon dioxide (CO_{2}) from the atmosphere and in some circumstances sequester it long term. Natural iron fertilization is accepted as a major force behind the significant drop in CO2 and temperatures that lead to ice ages.

Iron is necessary for all life and for photosynthesis in plants. Yet it is found in such minute concentrations in the upper the ocean, that no one even succeeded in measuring it until the 1980s. Iron is generally insoluble in seawater and sinks readily. In much of the ocean, this element is the limiting nutrient for phytoplankton growth. Recent studies find that iron levels have been decreasing in most of the ocean, along with phytoplankton.

Approximately 25 percent of the ocean surface contains ample macronutrients but little plant biomass (as defined by the presence of chlorophyll). The production in these high-nutrient low-chlorophyll (HNLC) waters is primarily limited by micronutrients, especially iron.

Intentional ocean iron fertilization (OIF) represents deliberate biomimicry of the natural processes that have for eons distributed iron, boosted ocean photosynthesis and ocean life, and removed atmospheric CO_{2.}

Because of its potential to mitigate climate change, intentional OIF has been called "geoengineering." Some activists argue that effective atmospheric CO2 removal would lessen the will to reduce the use of fossil fuels, thus creating a moral hazard. Some critics point to our limited understanding of the complex marine ecosystem and the effect large-scale OIF might have on it, including the risk of potential side effects such as release of nitrogen oxides and potential ecological disruption.

However, OIF researchers stress that ecological risks remain theoretical, as no harm has actually been observed in field trials. Nevertheless, scientists call for vigilant ecological monitoring in future trials.

Since 1990, 13 major large scale experiments have been carried out to evaluate efficiency and possible consequences of iron fertilization in ocean waters. Results varied according to aims and conditions. All found an increase in phytoplankton growth with the addition of trace amounts of iron. In the EIFEX trial, at least half the bloom biomass sank far below a depth of 1,000 meters, and a substantial portion likely reached the seafloor; likely becoming sequestered for hundreds or thousands of years.

In the last few years, interest has markedly increased in the science of and potential for iron fertilization. A white paper by the US National Oceanographic and Atmospheric Administration rated iron fertilization as having "moderate potential for cost, scalability and how long carbon might be stored compared to other marine sequestration ideas".

Research on the effects of volcanic eruptions, particularly Mt. Pinatubo in 1991, suggests that many gigatons of CO2 were removed by natural iron fertilization from volcanic ash, with the implication that biomimicry might produce significant results in similar conditions. The conditions are iron distribution 1) in a downwelling eddy and 2) sufficient to nourish the growth of nitrogen-fixing (self-fertilizing) phytoplankton.

== Process ==
=== Role of iron in carbon sequestration ===
Iron, a common element on land, is found only in trace amounts in the upper ocean, as most of it sinks. Yet it is necessary for all life, and for photosynthesis in green plants and algae, including phytoplankton. Replenishing iron in iron-deficient areas promotes phytoplankton growth. Oceanographer John Martin forwarded the "iron hypothesis" in the late 1980s based on studies of Antarctic ice cores as well as his own experiments. He showed that adding iron to iron-deficient seawater can lead to large-scale phytoplankton blooms that draw down large amounts of atmospheric carbon dioxide and sequester much of it. In fact, he found that an increase in iron-rich dust blown from the continents out to sea—which stimulated phytoplankton growth—was responsible for much of the CO2 drawdown that cooled the planet in the lead-up to ice ages.

Iron fertilization is an important process that occurs naturally in the ocean waters. In addition to wind-borne dust, iron-rich minerals can be carried long distances by volcanic ash as well as rivers and glaciers. Upwellings of ocean currents can bring nutrient-rich sediments to the surface. Whales also cycle iron to the upper ocean: They consume iron-rich organisms in deep water, then defecate at the surface, providing iron fertilizer that stimulates phytoplankton blooms. It has been shown that reduction in the number of sperm whales in the Southern Ocean has resulted in a 200,000 tonnes/yr decrease in atmospheric carbon uptake, possibly due to limited phytoplankton growth.

=== Carbon sequestration by phytoplankton ===
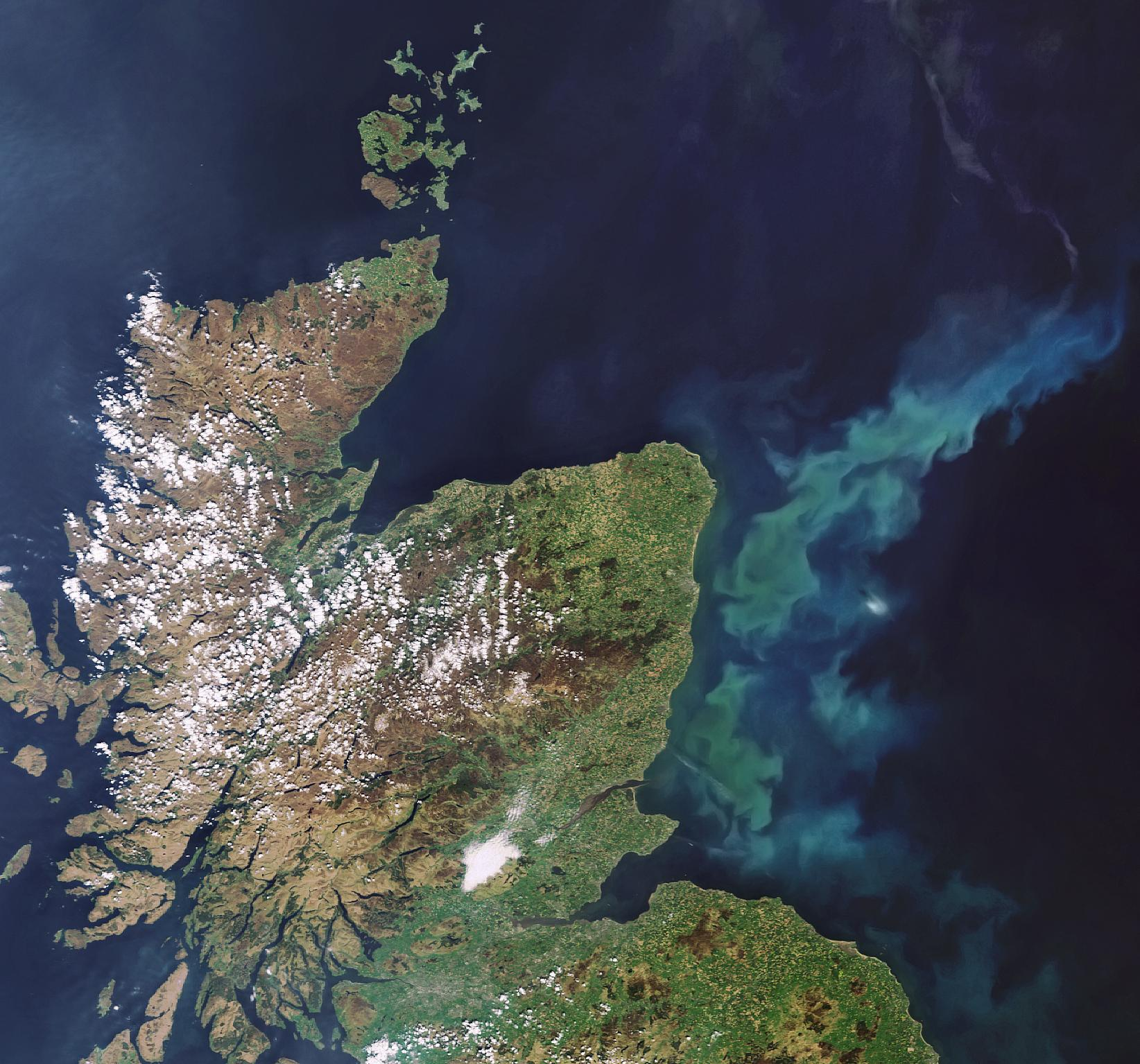
An oceanic phytoplankton bloom in the North Sea off the coast of eastern Scotland

Phytoplankton is photosynthetic: it needs sunlight and nutrients to grow, and takes up carbon dioxide in the process, fixing the carbon into its tissue. When it dies, some of this biocarbon sinks deep in the ocean. In addition, some plankton build mineral shells incorporating carbon; these speed and deepen the sinking of fecal pellets and other detritus known as marine snow. In some cases, much of the carbon-rich biomass generated from plankton is consumed by other organisms (small fish, zooplankton, etc.)

Researchers generally agree that a certain amount of biocarbon can reach the deep ocean, where much of it dissolves and remains for hundreds or thousands of years—permanent by practical standards. If it does not sink deeply enough, the carbon may surface and return to the atmosphere.

However, recent research indicates that when iron fertilization—natural or intentional—takes place within a downwelling eddy, the biocarbon is typically pulled down deep enough to dissolve and remain sequestered. Researchers are developing a new generation of iron fertilization based on 1) localized siting within downwelling eddies and 2) the effect of naturally occurring nitrogen-fixing bacteria, which enhance natural plankton blooms.

=== Efficiency and concerns ===
Early papers estimated low potential efficacy for ocean iron fertilization, suggesting that offsetting anthropogenic emissions would require treating an entire ocean basin. More recent research, based on evidence from the geological record, suggests that well targeted interventions could not only offset current global emissions but also remove gigatons of legacy CO2 a year—in localized patches of mid-ocean that together would comprise less than one percent of ocean area. Proponents propose this pathway as a way to restore pre-industrial CO2 levels by mid-century.

Still, ocean iron fertilization remains controversial and debated due to concerns about potential negative impacts on marine ecosystems. Potential ecological concerns associated with large-scale iron fertilization have been identified in the scientific literature, particularly in modeling studies. However, no ecological harm such as animal mortality or cascading effects on food webs have been observed in any of the 13 major field tests. Some studies have raised the theoretical possibility that decomposing phytoplankton blooms could contribute to oxygen depletion in subsurface waters under certain conditions. However, this effect has not been observed in open-ocean OIF experiments, which are conducted in well-circulated waters far from oxygen-depleted coastal zones. Regarding harmful algal blooms: some OIF experiments, including SOFeX, documented growth of Pseudo-nitzschia, a diatom genus that includes species capable of producing domoic acid. While domoic acid was detected, no harm was observed in the open-ocean setting. HABs as commonly understood — toxic blooms causing documented harm to marine organisms or humans — were not produced in any of the 13 major OIF trials conducted between 1990 and 2012.

In addition to ecological concerns, critics cite challenges related to the effectiveness and long-term stability of carbon sequestration through iron fertilisation. While phytoplankton can capture CO_{2} and sink deep, some contend that a significant portion of this carbon may eventually be released back into the atmosphere due to various oceanic processes, diminishing the technique's long-term effectiveness. Some research indicates that the success of carbon sequestration is highly variable, influenced by factors such as ocean currents and temperature.

Current work suggests that localizing iron fertilizer in downwelling eddies is the key to consistent sinking of biocarbon deep enough for the carbon to be remineralized and permanently sequestered.

== Methods ==
There are two ways of performing artificial iron fertilization: ship based direct into the ocean and atmospheric deployment.

=== Ship based deployment ===
Trials of ocean fertilization using iron sulphate added directly to the surface water from ships are described in detail in the experiment section below.

=== Atmospheric sourcing ===
Iron-rich dust rising into the atmosphere is a primary source of ocean iron fertilization. For example, wind blown dust from the Sahara desert fertilizes the Atlantic Ocean and the Amazon rainforest. The naturally occurring iron oxide in atmospheric dust reacts with hydrogen chloride from sea spray to produce iron chloride, which degrades methane and other greenhouse gases, brightens clouds and eventually falls with the rain in low concentration across a wide area of the globe. Unlike ship based deployment, no trials have been performed of increasing the natural level of atmospheric iron. Expanding this atmospheric source of iron could complement ship-based deployment.

One proposal is to boost the atmospheric iron level with iron salt aerosol. Iron(III) chloride added to the troposphere could increase natural cooling effects including methane removal, cloud brightening and ocean fertilization, helping to prevent or reverse global warming.

== Experiments ==
Martin hypothesized that increasing phytoplankton photosynthesis could slow or even reverse global warming by sequestering CO_{2} in the sea. He died shortly thereafter during preparations for Ironex I, a proof of concept research voyage, which was successfully carried out near the Galapagos Islands in 1993 by his colleagues at Moss Landing Marine Laboratories. Thereafter 12 international ocean studies examined the phenomenon:

- Ironex II, 1995
- SOIREE (Southern Ocean Iron Release Experiment), 1999
- EisenEx (Iron Experiment), 2000
- SEEDS (Subarctic Pacific Iron Experiment for Ecosystem Dynamics Study), 2001
- SOFeX (Southern Ocean Iron Experiments - North & South), 2002
- SERIES (Subarctic Ecosystem Response to Iron Enrichment Study), 2002
- SEEDS-II, 2004
- EIFEX (European Iron Fertilization Experiment), A successful experiment conducted in 2004 in a mesoscale ocean eddy in the South Atlantic resulted in a bloom of diatoms, a large portion of which died and sank to the ocean floor when fertilization ended. In contrast to the LOHAFEX experiment, also conducted in a mesoscale eddy, the ocean in the selected area contained enough dissolved silicon for the diatoms to flourish.
- CROZEX (CROZet natural iron bloom and Export experiment), 2005
- A pilot project planned by Planktos, a U.S. company, was cancelled in 2008 for lack of funding. The company blamed environmental organizations for the failure.
- LOHAFEX (Indian and German Iron Fertilization Experiment), 2009 Despite widespread opposition to LOHAFEX, on 26 January 2009 the German Federal Ministry of Education and Research (BMBF) gave clearance. The experiment was carried out in waters low in silicic acid, an essential nutrient for diatom growth. This affected sequestration efficacy. A 900 square kilometers (350 sq mi) portion of the southwest Atlantic was fertilized with iron sulfate. A large phytoplankton bloom was triggered. In the absence of diatoms, a relatively small amount of carbon was sequestered, because other phytoplankton are vulnerable to predation by zooplankton and do not sink rapidly upon death. These results led some researchers to question sequestration efficiency in low-silica environments specifically.However, prior ocean fertilization experiments in high silica locations revealed much higher carbon sequestration rates because of diatom growth. LOHAFEX confirmed sequestration potential depends strongly upon appropriate siting.
- Haida Salmon Restoration Corporation (HSRC), 2012 - funded by the Old Massett Haida band and managed by Russ George - dumped 100 tonnes of iron sulphate into the Pacific into an eddy 200 nautical miles (370 km) west of the islands of Haida Gwaii. This resulted in increased algae growth over 10,000 square miles (26,000 km^{2}). Critics alleged George's actions violated the United Nations Convention on Biological Diversity (CBD) and the London convention on the dumping of wastes at sea which prohibited such geoengineering experiments. On 15 July 2014, the resulting scientific data was made available to the public.

John Martin, director of the Moss Landing Marine Laboratories, hypothesized that the low levels of phytoplankton in these regions are due to a lack of iron. In 1989 he tested this hypothesis (known as the Iron Hypothesis) by an experiment using samples of clean water from Antarctica. Iron was added to some of these samples. After several days the phytoplankton in the samples with iron fertilization grew much more than in the untreated samples. This led Martin to speculate that increased iron concentrations in the oceans could partly explain past ice ages.

=== IRONEX I ===
This experiment was followed by a larger field experiment (IRONEX I) where 445 kg of iron was added to a patch of ocean near the Galápagos Islands. The levels of phytoplankton increased three times in the experimental area. The success of this experiment and others led to proposals to use this technique to remove carbon dioxide from the atmosphere.

=== EisenEx ===
In 2000 and 2004, iron sulfate was discharged from the EisenEx. 10 to 20 percent of the resulting algal bloom died and sank to the sea floor.

=== Commercial projects ===
Planktos was a US company that abandoned its plans to conduct 6 iron fertilization cruises from 2007 to 2009, each of which would have dissolved up to 100 tons of iron over a 10,000 km^{2} area of ocean. Their ship Weatherbird II was refused entry to the port of Las Palmas in the Canary Islands where it was to take on provisions and scientific equipment.

In 2007 commercial companies such as Climos and GreenSea Ventures and the Australian-based Ocean Nourishment Corporation, planned to engage in fertilization projects. These companies invited green co-sponsors to finance their activities in return for provision of carbon credits to offset investors' CO_{2} emissions.

=== LOHAFEX ===
LOHAFEX was an experiment initiated by the German Federal Ministry of Research and carried out by the German Alfred Wegener Institute (AWI) in 2009 to study fertilization in the South Atlantic. India was also involved.

As part of the experiment, the German research vessel Polarstern deposited 6 tons of ferrous sulfate in an area of 300 square kilometers. It was expected that the material would distribute through the upper 15 metres (49 ft) of water and trigger an algal bloom. A significant part of the carbon dioxide dissolved in sea water would then be bound by the emerging bloom and sink to the ocean floor.

The Federal Environment Ministry called for the experiment to halt, partly because environmentalists predicted damage to marine plants. Others predicted long-term effects that would not be detectable during short-term observation or that this would encourage large-scale ecosystem manipulation.

=== 2012 ===
A 2012 study deposited iron fertilizer in an eddy near Antarctica. The resulting algal bloom sent a significant amount of carbon into the deep ocean, where it was expected to remain for centuries to millennia. The eddy was chosen because it offered a largely self-contained test system.

As of day 24, nutrients, including nitrogen, phosphorus and silicic acid that diatoms use to construct their shells, declined. Dissolved inorganic carbon concentrations were reduced below equilibrium with atmospheric CO_{2}. In surface water, particulate organic matter (algal remains) including silica and chlorophyll increased.

After day 24, however, the particulate matter fell to between 100 metres (330 ft) to the ocean floor. Each iron atom converted at least 13,000 carbon atoms into algae. At least half of the organic matter sank below, 1,000 metres (3,300 ft).

=== Haida Gwaii project ===
In July 2012, the Haida Salmon Restoration Corporation dispersed 100 short tons (91 t) of iron sulphate dust into the Pacific Ocean several hundred miles west of the islands of Haida Gwaii. The Old Massett Village Council financed the action as a salmon enhancement project with $2.5 million in village funds. The concept was that the formerly iron-deficient waters would produce more phytoplankton that would in turn serve as a "pasture" to feed salmon. Then-CEO Russ George hoped to sell carbon offsets to recover the costs. The project was accompanied by charges of unscientific procedures and recklessness. George contended that 100 tons was negligible compared to what naturally enters the ocean.

Some environmentalists called the dumping a "blatant violation" of two international moratoria. George said that the Old Massett Village Council and its lawyers approved the effort and at least seven Canadian agencies were aware of it.

According to George, the 2013 salmon runs increased from 50 million to 226 million fish. However, many experts contend that changes in fishery stocks since 2012 cannot necessarily be attributed to the 2012 iron fertilization; many factors contribute to predictive models, and most data from the experiment are considered to be of questionable scientific value.

On 15 July 2014, the data gathered during the project were made publicly available under the ODbL license.

=== Experiments with iron-coated rice husks in Arabian Sea ===
In 2022, a UK/India research team plans to place iron-coated rice husks in the Arabian Sea, to test whether increasing time at the surface can stimulate a bloom using less iron. The iron will be confined within a plastic bag reaching from the surface several kilometers down to the sea bottom. The Centre for Climate Repair at the University of Cambridge, along with India's Institute of Maritime Studies assessed the impact of iron seeding in another experiment. They spread iron-coated rice husks across an area of the Arabian Sea. Iron is a limiting nutrient in many ocean waters. They hoped that the iron would fertilize algae, which would bolster the bottom of the marine food chain and sequester carbon as uneaten algae died. The experiment was demolished by a storm, leaving inconclusive results.

Ocean fertilization occurs naturally when upwellings bring nutrient-rich water to the surface, as occurs when ocean currents meet an ocean bank or a sea mount. This form of fertilization produces the world's largest marine habitats. Fertilization can also occur when weather carries wind blown dust long distances over the ocean, or iron-rich minerals are carried into the ocean by glaciers, rivers and icebergs.

=== Role of iron ===
About 70% of the world's surface is covered in oceans. The part of these where light can penetrate is inhabited by algae (and other marine life). In some oceans, algae growth and reproduction is limited by the amount of iron. Iron is a vital micronutrient for phytoplankton growth and photosynthesis that has historically been delivered to the pelagic sea by dust storms from arid lands. This Aeolian dust contains 3–5% iron and its deposition has fallen nearly 25% in recent decades.

The Redfield ratio describes the relative atomic concentrations of critical nutrients in plankton biomass and is conventionally written "106 C: 16 N: 1 P." This expresses the fact that one atom of phosphorus and 16 of nitrogen are required to "fix" 106 carbon atoms (or 106 molecules of CO_{2}). Research expanded this constant to "106 C: 16 N: 1 P: .001 Fe" signifying that in iron deficient conditions each atom of iron can fix 106,000 atoms of carbon, or on a mass basis, each kilogram of iron can fix 83,000 kg of carbon dioxide. The 2004 EIFEX experiment reported a carbon dioxide to iron export ratio of nearly 3000 to 1. The atomic ratio would be approximately: "3000 C: 58,000 N: 3,600 P: 1 Fe".

Therefore, small amounts of iron (measured by mass parts per trillion) in HNLC zones can trigger large phytoplankton blooms on the order of 100,000 kilograms of plankton per kilogram of iron. The size of the iron particles is critical. Particles of 0.5–1 micrometer or less seem to be ideal both in terms of sink rate and bioavailability. Particles this small are easier for cyanobacteria and other phytoplankton to incorporate and the churning of surface waters keeps them in the euphotic or sunlit biologically active depths without sinking for long periods. One way to add small amounts of iron to HNLC zones would be Atmospheric Methane Removal.

Atmospheric deposition is an important iron source. Satellite images and data (such as PODLER, MODIS, MSIR) combined with back-trajectory analyses identified natural sources of iron–containing dust. Iron-bearing dusts erode from soil and are transported by wind. Although most dust sources are situated in the Northern Hemisphere, the largest dust sources are located in northern and southern Africa, North America, central Asia and Australia.

Heterogeneous chemical reactions in the atmosphere modify the speciation of iron in dust and may affect the bioavailability of deposited iron. The soluble form of iron is much higher in aerosols than in soil (~0.5%). Several photo-chemical interactions with dissolved organic acids increase iron solubility in aerosols. Among these, photochemical reduction of oxalate-bound Fe(III) from iron-containing minerals is important. The organic ligand forms a surface complex with the Fe (III) metal center of an iron-containing mineral (such as hematite or goethite). On exposure to solar radiation the complex is converted to an excited energy state in which the ligand, acting as bridge and an electron donor, supplies an electron to Fe(III) producing soluble Fe(II). Consistent with this, studies documented a distinct diel variation in the concentrations of Fe (II) and Fe(III) in which daytime Fe(II) concentrations exceed those of Fe(III).

=== Volcanic ash as an iron source ===
Volcanic ash has a significant role in supplying the world's oceans with iron. Volcanic ash is composed of glass shards, pyrogenic minerals, lithic particles and other forms of ash that release nutrients at different rates depending on structure and the type of reaction caused by contact with water.

Increases of biogenic opal in the sediment record are associated with increased iron accumulation over the last million years. In August 2008, an eruption in the Aleutian Islands deposited ash in the nutrient-limited Northeast Pacific. This ash and iron deposition resulted in one of the largest phytoplankton blooms observed in the subarctic.

=== Carbon sequestration ===
Previous instances of biological carbon sequestration triggered major climatic changes, lowering the temperature of the planet, such as the Azolla event. Plankton that generate calcium or silicon carbonate skeletons, such as diatoms, coccolithophores and foraminifera, account for most direct sequestration. When these organisms die their carbonate skeletons sink relatively quickly and form a major component of the carbon-rich deep sea precipitation known as marine snow. Marine snow also includes fish fecal pellets and other organic detritus, and steadily falls thousands of meters below active plankton blooms.

Of the carbon-rich biomass generated by plankton blooms, half (or more) is generally consumed by grazing organisms (zooplankton, krill, small fish, etc.) but 20 to 30% sinks below 200 meters (660 ft) into the colder water strata below the thermocline. Much of this fixed carbon continues into the abyss, but a substantial percentage is redissolved and remineralized. At this depth, however, this carbon is now suspended in deep currents and effectively isolated from the atmosphere for centuries.

==== Analysis and quantification ====
Evaluation of the biological effects and verification of the amount of carbon actually sequestered by any particular bloom involves a variety of measurements, combining ship-borne and remote sampling, submarine filtration traps, tracking buoy spectroscopy and satellite telemetry. Unpredictable ocean currents can remove experimental iron patches from the pelagic zone, invalidating the experiment.

The potential of fertilization to tackle global warming is illustrated by the following figures. If phytoplankton converted all the nitrate and phosphate present in the surface mixed layer across the entire Antarctic circumpolar current into organic carbon, the resulting carbon dioxide deficit could be compensated by uptake from the atmosphere amounting to about 0.8 to 1.4 gigatonnes of carbon per year. This quantity is comparable in magnitude to annual anthropogenic fossil fuels combustion of approximately 6 gigatonnes. The Antarctic circumpolar current region is one of several in which iron fertilization could be conducted—the Galapagos islands area another potentially suitable location.

=== Dimethyl sulfide and clouds ===
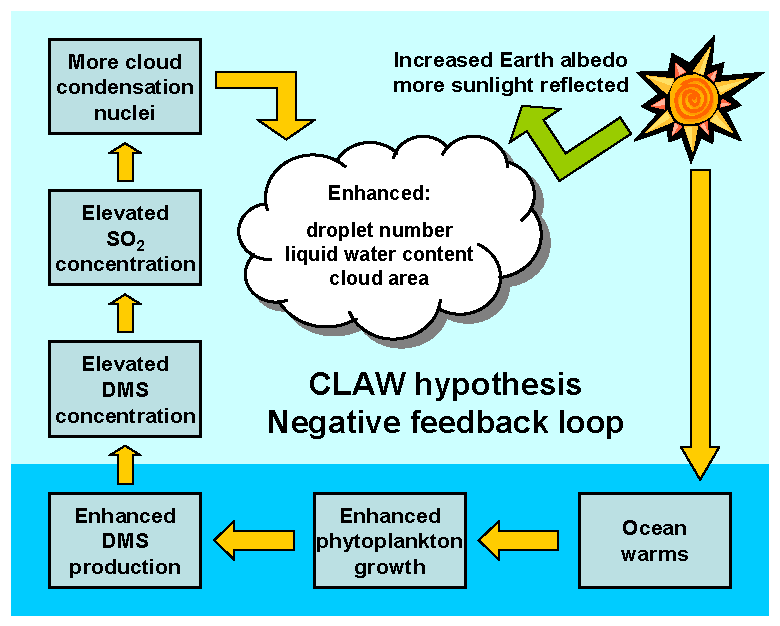
Schematic diagram of the CLAW hypothesis (Charlson et al., 1987)

Some species of plankton produce dimethyl sulfide (DMS), a portion of which enters the atmosphere where it is oxidized by hydroxyl radicals (OH), atomic chlorine (Cl) and bromine monoxide (BrO) to form sulfate particles, and potentially increase cloud cover. This may increase the albedo of the planet and so cause cooling—this proposed mechanism is central to the CLAW hypothesis. This is one of the examples used by James Lovelock to illustrate his Gaia hypothesis.

During SOFeX, DMS concentrations increased by a factor of four inside the fertilized patch. Widescale iron fertilization of the Southern Ocean could lead to significant sulfur-triggered cooling in addition to that due to the CO_{2} uptake and that due to the ocean's albedo increase, however the amount of cooling by this particular effect is very uncertain.

== International regulation ==
International governance of ocean iron fertilization has evolved through the London Convention and London Protocol framework. In October 2008, the Contracting Parties adopted Resolution LC-LP.1 (2008), which declared that the scope of both treaties covers these operations and ruled that "given the present state of knowledge, ocean fertilization activities other than legitimate scientific research should not be allowed." The resolution explicitly noted that commercial implementations "should be considered as contrary to the aims of the Convention and Protocol and not currently qualify for any exemption from the definition of dumping." This non-binding resolution successfully established a de facto global moratorium distinguishing commercial operations from scientific research.

In 2010, the Parties adopted Resolution LC-LP.2, establishing a formal Assessment Framework for scientific research proposals involving ocean fertilization, providing guidance on environmental assessment, risk management, and monitoring requirements.

In 2013, the London Protocol Contracting Parties adopted Resolution LP.4(8), amending the Protocol to add provisions specifically addressing marine geoengineering, including ocean fertilization. Under this framework, ocean fertilization activities assessed as legitimate scientific research may be authorized under permit; commercial deployment remains prohibited pending further evaluation. This 2013 amendment represents the current operative regulatory framework.

The Convention on Biological Diversity has separately called for a moratorium on ocean fertilization other than small-scale scientific research within coastal waters, a position maintained in subsequent CBD decisions.

== Financial opportunities ==
Beginning with the Kyoto Protocol, several countries and the European Union established carbon offset markets which trade certified emission reduction credits (CERs) and other types of carbon credit instruments. In 2007 CERs sold for approximately €15–20/ton CO^{e}_{2}. Iron fertilization is relatively inexpensive compared to scrubbing, direct injection and other industrial approaches, and can theoretically sequester for less than €5/ton CO_{2}, creating a substantial return.

In August 2010, Russia established a minimum price of €10/ton for offsets to reduce uncertainty for offset providers. Scientists have reported a 6–12% decline in global plankton production since 1980. A full-scale plankton restoration program could regenerate approximately 3–5 billion tons of sequestration capacity worth €50-100 billion in carbon offset value. However, a 2013 study indicates the cost versus benefits of iron fertilization puts it behind carbon capture and storage and carbon taxes.

== Debate ==
While ocean iron fertilization could represent a potent means to slow global warming, there is a current debate surrounding the efficacy of this strategy and the potential adverse effects of this.

=== Precautionary principle ===
The precautionary principle is a proposed guideline regarding environmental conservation. According to an article published in 2021, the precautionary principle (PP) is a concept that states, "when it is scientifically plausible that human activities may lead to morally unacceptable harm, actions shall be taken to avoid or diminish that harm: uncertainty should not be an excuse to delay action." Based on this principle, and because there is little data quantifying the effects of iron fertilization, it is the responsibility of leaders in this field to avoid the harmful effects of this procedure. This school of thought is one argument against using iron fertilization on a wide scale, at least until more data is available to analyze the repercussions of this.

=== Ecological issues ===
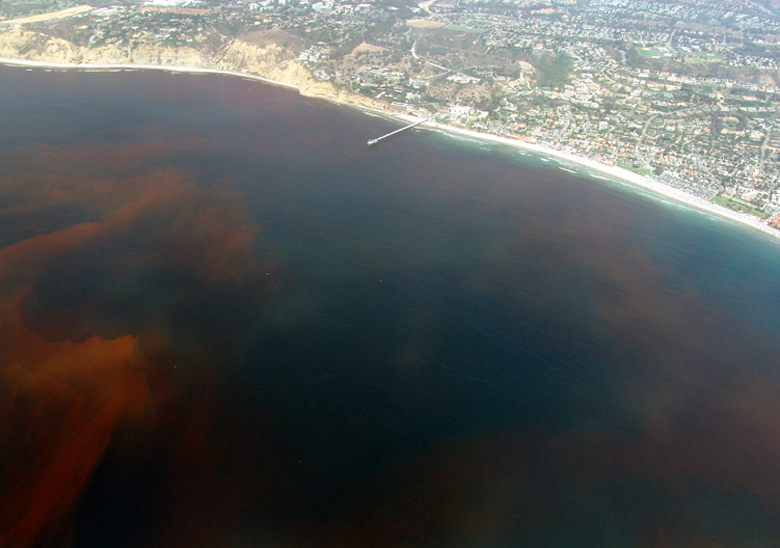
A "red tide" off the coast of La Jolla, San Diego, California.

Critics are concerned that fertilization will create harmful algal blooms (HAB) as many toxic algae are often favored when iron is deposited into the marine ecosystem. A 2010 study of iron fertilization in an oceanic high-nitrate, low-chlorophyll environment, however, found that fertilized Pseudo-nitzschia diatom spp., which are generally nontoxic in the open ocean, began producing toxic levels of domoic acid. Even short-lived blooms containing such toxins could have detrimental effects on marine food webs.

Most species of phytoplankton are harmless or beneficial, given that they constitute the base of the marine food chain. Fertilization increases phytoplankton only in the open oceans (far from shore) where iron deficiency is substantial. Most coastal waters are replete with iron and adding more has no useful effect. It has been shown that there are often higher mineralization rates with iron fertilization, leading to a turn over in the plankton masses that are produced. This results in no beneficial effects and actually causes an increase in CO_{2}. A 2023 study showed that fertilization may even amplify the effects of climate change.

A 2010 study showed that iron enrichment stimulates toxic diatom production in high-nitrate, low-chlorophyll areas which, the authors argue, raises "serious concerns over the net benefit and sustainability of large-scale iron fertilizations". Nitrogen released by cetaceans and iron chelate are a significant benefit to the marine food chain in addition to sequestering carbon for long periods of time.

==== Ocean acidification ====
A 2009 study tested the potential of iron fertilization to reduce both atmospheric CO_{2} and ocean acidity using a global ocean carbon model. The study found that, "Our simulations show that ocean iron fertilization, even in the extreme scenario by depleting global surface macronutrient concentration to zero at all time, has a minor effect on mitigating CO2-induced acidification at the surface ocean." Unfortunately, the impact on ocean acidification would likely not change due to the low effects that iron fertilization has on CO_{2} levels.

== History ==
Consideration of iron's importance to phytoplankton growth and photosynthesis dates to the 1930s when Dr Thomas John Hart, a British marine biologist based on the RRS Discovery II in the Southern Ocean speculated - in "On the phytoplankton of the South-West Atlantic and Bellingshausen Sea, 1929-31" - that great "desolate zones" (areas apparently rich in nutrients, but lacking in phytoplankton activity or other sea life) might be iron-deficient. Hart returned to this issue in a 1942 paper entitled "Phytoplankton periodicity in Antarctic surface waters", but little other scientific discussion was recorded until the 1980s, when oceanographer John Martin of the Moss Landing Marine Laboratories renewed controversy on the topic with his marine water nutrient analyses. His studies supported Hart's hypothesis. These "desolate" regions came to be called "high-nutrient, low-chlorophyll regions" (HNLC).

John Gribbin was the first scientist to publicly suggest that climate change could be reduced by adding large amounts of soluble iron to the oceans. Martin's 1988 quip four months later at Woods Hole Oceanographic Institution, "Give me a half a tanker of iron and I will give you an ice age," drove a decade of research.

The findings suggested that iron deficiency was limiting ocean productivity and offered an approach to mitigating climate change as well. Perhaps the most dramatic support for Martin's hypothesis came with the 1991 eruption of Mount Pinatubo in the Philippines. Environmental scientist Andrew Watson analyzed global data from that eruption and calculated that it deposited approximately 40,000 tons of iron dust into oceans worldwide. This single fertilization event preceded an easily observed global decline in atmospheric CO_{2} and a parallel pulsed increase in oxygen levels.

The parties to the London Dumping Convention adopted a non-binding resolution in 2008 on fertilization (labeled LC-LP.1(2008)). The resolution states that ocean fertilization activities, other than legitimate scientific research, "should be considered as contrary to the aims of the Convention and Protocol and do not currently qualify for any exemption from the definition of dumping". An Assessment Framework for Scientific Research Involving Ocean Fertilization, regulating the dumping of wastes at sea (labeled LC-LP.2(2010)) was adopted by the Contracting Parties to the Convention in October 2010 (LC 32/LP 5).

Multiple ocean labs, scientists and businesses have explored fertilization. Beginning in 1993, thirteen research teams completed ocean trials demonstrating that phytoplankton blooms can be stimulated by iron augmentation. Controversy remains over the effectiveness of atmospheric CO_{2} sequestration and ecological effects. Ocean trials of ocean iron fertilization took place in 2009 in the South Atlantic by project LOHAFEX, and in July 2012 in the North Pacific off the coast of British Columbia, Canada, by the Haida Salmon Restoration Corporation (HSRC).

== See also ==
- Carbon dioxide sink
- Iron chelate
- Ocean pipes
- Liebig's law of the minimum
- Iron cycle
