= Ashfall advisory =

Weather advisory in the United States

An Ashfall advisory is a weather advisory issued by the National Weather Service of the United States. Ashfall advisories are issued when there is a likely future or present occurrence of ash rain caused by a large plume of suspended airborne ash, typically caused by large fires or volcanic activity. The National Weather service map color is Dark Grey.

Ashfall Advisories are often accompanied with special weather statements.

== Example of an ashfall advisory ==
URGENT - MARINE WEATHER MESSAGE...CORRECTED
National Weather Service Honolulu HI
708 AM HST Thu May 17 2018

...ASHFALL ADVISORY IN EFFECT...

Ash from Kilauea Volcano will affect waters east through south of
the Big Island.


PHZ122-124-172200-
/O.COR.PHFO.MH.Y.0001.180517T1700Z-180517T2200Z/
Big Island Windward Waters-Big Island Leeward Waters-
Big Island Southeast Waters-
708 AM HST Thu May 17 2018

...ASHFALL ADVISORY IN EFFECT UNTIL NOON HST TODAY...

The National Weather Service in Honolulu has issued an Ashfall
Advisory, which is in effect until noon HST today.

* ERUPTION...Kilauea Volcano Summit (19.4N 155.3W) occurred at
  about 415 am HST. Additional eruptions may occur the rest of
  this morning.

* LOCATION...Volcanic ash is expected to affect waters adjacent to
  but especially downwind of Kilauea Volcano.

* TIMING...This advisory is in effect until 12 pm HST this
  afternoon. The advisory may need to be extended if volcanic
  ashfall persists.

* IMPACTS...Ash accumulation of less than one quarter inch is
  possible on vessels in the advisory area. Mariners should avoid
  this area until the ashfall subsides.

PRECAUTIONARY/PREPAREDNESS ACTIONS...

For more information on the current status of Kilauea Volcano,
see https://volcanoes.usgs.gov/volcanoes/kilauea/status.html

== See also ==
- National Weather Service
- Wildfire
- Volcanic ash
