= Low-nutrient, low-chlorophyll region =

Aquatic region of low-nutrient concentration

Low-nutrient, low-chlorophyll (LNLC) regions are aquatic zones that are low in nutrients (such as nitrogen, phosphorus, or iron) and consequently have low rate of primary production, as indicated by low chlorophyll concentrations. These regions can be described as oligotrophic, and about 75% of the world's oceans encompass LNLC regions. A majority of LNLC regions are associated with subtropical gyres but are also present in areas of the Mediterranean Sea, and some inland lakes. Physical processes limit nutrient availability in LNLC regions, which favors nutrient recycling in the photic zone and selects for smaller phytoplankton species. LNLC regions are generally not found near coasts, since coastal areas receive more nutrients from terrestrial sources and upwelling. In marine systems, seasonal and decadal variability of primary productivity in LNLC regions is driven in part by large-scale climatic regimes (e.g. El Niño-Southern Oscillation) leading to important effects on the global carbon cycle and the oceanic carbon cycle.

The naming of these regions follows the same format as the more widely known high-nutrient, low-chlorophyll (HNLC) regions, which display high macro-nutrient concentrations but unusually low primary production and chlorophyll concentrations, usually due to lack of micro-nutrients, usually iron-limitation. While the LNLC terminology appears synonymous with oligotrophic, literature in recent decades has predominantly used the term to define oligotrophic ocean areas (as opposed to lakes, rivers, or other bodies of water) in discussions about dust and iron fertilization. Occasionally, LNLC refers to "low nitrate, low chlorophyll," which has a similar meaning.

== Chlorophyll and primary production ==
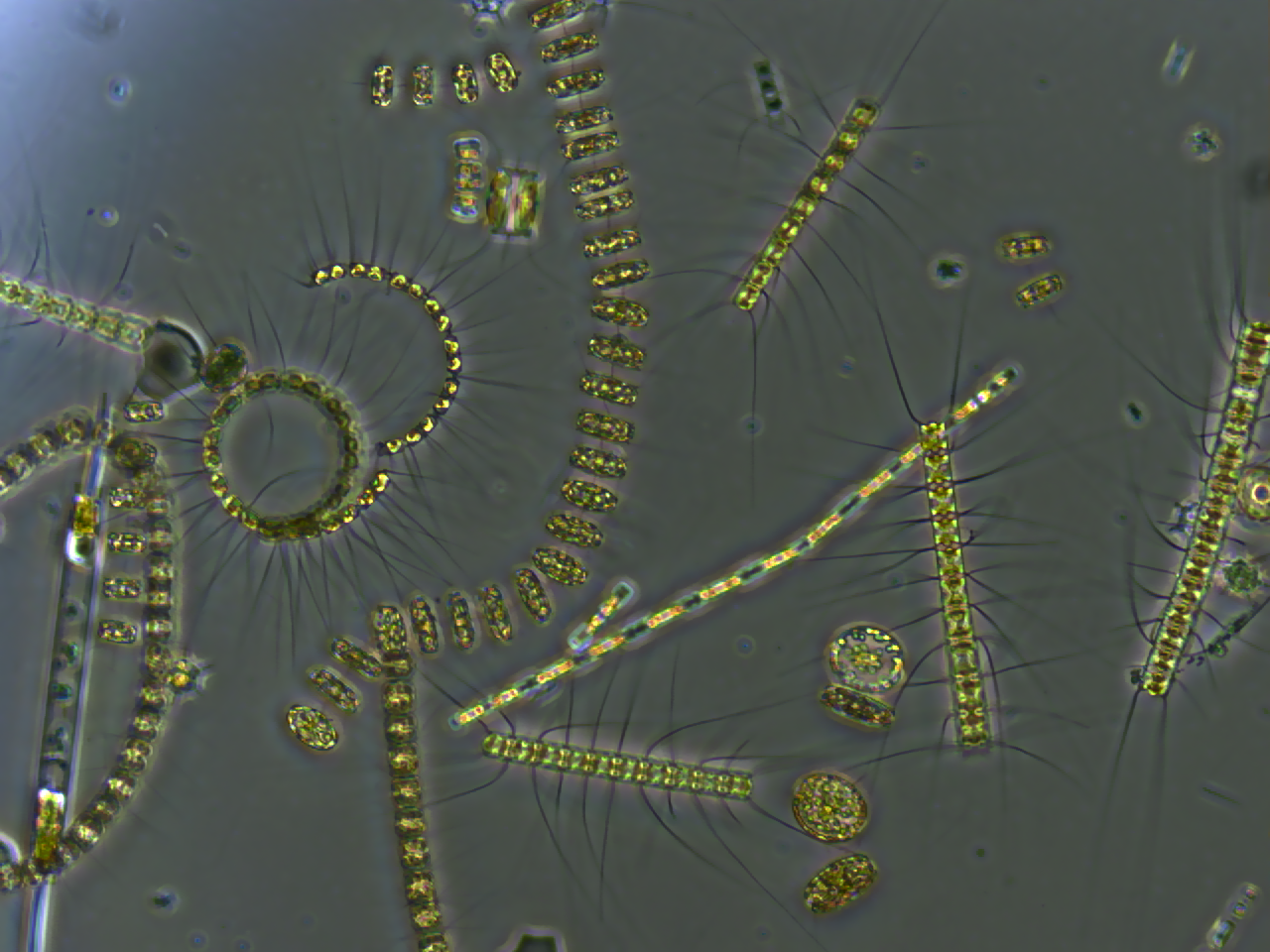
Mixed phytoplankton community. Important primary producers within the global ocean.

Chlorophylls are the light harvesting pigments employed in photosynthesizing organisms that facilitate the conversion of light into cellular energy for synthesis of organic matter. In aquatic systems, chlorophyll concentrations are frequently used as a proxy measurement for photosynthetic plankton (phytoplankton) abundance and thus the amount of primary production. Chlorophyll concentrations can serve as an estimate for primary productivity.

Primary production is the process of converting CO_{2}, either gaseous or aqueous, and other elements into organic compounds. The extent of global primary production therefore controls how much energy is available to in the biosphere. Most primary production in the ocean occurs via photosynthesis, by organisms called phototrophic primary producers. Phototrophs are the foundation of most aquatic food webs, and primary production in the ocean accounts for about half of Earth's carbon fixation.

In addition to light and CO_{2}, photosynthesis requires nutrients, such as nitrate, phosphate, silicate, and iron in order for phytoplankton to grow. Primary productivity is therefore controlled by the availability of the limiting nutrient (Liebig's law of the minimum). The Redfield Ratio (106C:16N:1P) describes the general relative proportions of carbon, nitrogen, and phosphorus found in marine biomass. If a given region is limited by a nutrient, the relative proportion of nutrients can deviate from the Redfield Ratio. Due to the low nutrient levels in LNLCs, primary production in these regions is usually limited by one or more nutrients.

== Physical and biological determinants of nutrient cycling ==
Phytoplankton growth occurs in the upper ocean, or mixed layer, where sufficient light energy is available and turbulent mixing near the surface increases vertical homogeneity in ocean tracers like temperature, salinity, and density. Nutrient availability in the mixed layer, often a limiting factor for phytoplankton growth, is derived from three primary sources: 1) reintroduced nutrients from deep ocean water that is mixed into surface waters (i.e., new production), 2) recycled nutrients in the surface ocean (i.e., regenerated production), also known as the regeneration loop, and 3) 'external' nutrients introduced from terrestrial or atmospheric input and/or biological processes (such as, nitrogen fixation).

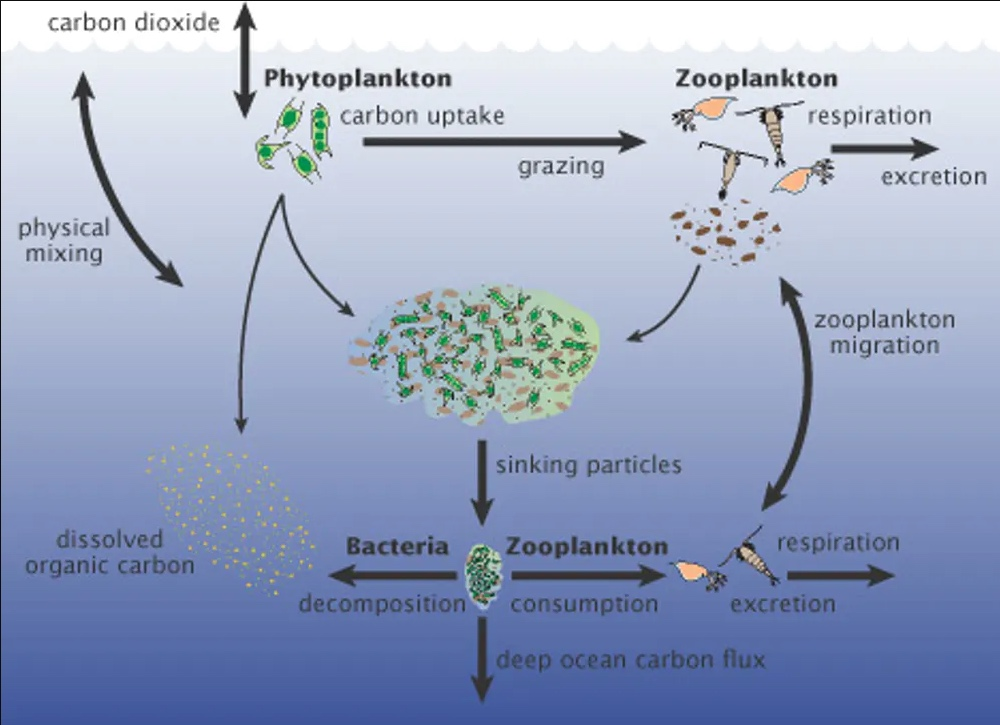
The biological pump (nutrient export) and nutrient regeneration loop. In LNLC regions, nutrients are quickly recycled by phytoplankton, zooplankton grazers, and decomposers that break down organic matter before it can be sequestered in the deep ocean.

LNLC regions result from a combination of processes that limit nutrient availability, primarily: the biological pump, Ekman downwelling, and stratification. The biological pump creates a nutrient gradient, or nutricline, in LNLC regions by exporting organic matter from the surface ocean to the deep ocean before that organic matter (OM) can be respired in the photic zone, thus also exporting the OM-associated nutrients from the photic zone. Nutrients transported to depth below the pycnocline can be reintroduced to the surface through ocean mixing processes (including Ekman upwelling and turbulent diffusion) that bring deep, nutrient-rich waters back to the ocean surface and stimulate primary production. LNLCs don't generally occur in regions with significant upwelling or turbulent diffusion because these areas generally see greater nutrient availability and thus primary production.

Lack of reintroduced nutrients can be exacerbated by Ekman downwelling, caused by convergent wind forcing and Ekman transport, which moves water masses downward and removes nutrients from the surface ocean by exporting them out of the photic zone. Downwelling locations are prime LNLC regions, like coastal areas with landward Ekman transport or subtropical gyres.

Stratification of the water column due to density gradients associated with temperature (see thermocline) or salinity (see halocline) also limits reintroduced nutrients from deep water by creating less dense water above more dense water that prevents ocean mixing, only allowing minimal nutrient delivery through the slower turbulent diffusion rates. Physical mixing processes caused by wind or storm events may however introduce nutrients from deeper in the water column into the photic zone and stimulate transient phytoplankton blooms.

While primary production is limited in downwelling or stratified LNLC regions, other nutrient sources become important for maintaining phytoplankton growth, like recycled surface water nutrients and external nutrients (aforementioned sources 2 and 3). Lower nutrient levels favor the growth of picophytoplankton, whose small size increases heterotrophic nutrient recycling (known as the microbial loop) and reduces the loss of nutrients from the biological pump due to the slower sinking rates of smaller particles.

In order to compensate for the low nitrogen/nutrient availability, nitrogen fixation is favored as a mechanism for bringing 'external' nutrients into the surface ocean. Nitrogen fixation is the microbial mediated process that converts biologically unavailable dissolved nitrogen gas, which is readily available in the atmosphere and mixed into oceans through diffusion and wave action mixing, into biologically available ammonium. Catalyzed by the enzyme nitrogenase, nitrogen fixation requires iron and often solar energy, making iron a common limiting nutrient in LNLCs. In areas far from terrestrial sources, iron is predominantly delivered through aeolian dust, naturally derived from arid landmasses (e.g. deserts) or volcanic eruptions, that can travel long distances to supply this critical micronutrient to LNLC regions like open ocean gyres.

== Productivity in LNLC regions ==
LNLC regions are estimated to cover around 75% of the global ocean, and despite the generally low per area rates of primary production, an estimated 40% of global ocean productivity occurs in these locations due to their large geographic extent.

A majority of the ocean's LNLC regions are within subtropical gyres, although the Mediterranean Sea is another large LNLC region (for more see Example section). In general, LNLC regions have relatively warm, stratified water columns that limit the delivery of new nutrients to the photic zone via upwelling, thus favoring the nutrient "regeneration loop" where the majority of nutrients are recycled between primary producers, grazers and heterotrophic bacteria. Because the regeneration loop is favored in LNLC regions, there are low rates of new production and limited organic matter exported via the biological pump. However, these regions can experience seasonal and episodic nutrient delivery events that increase primary productivity, favoring the "export pathway" (biological pump), where both dissolved and particulate organic matter exit the system, some of which is sequestered in the deep ocean.

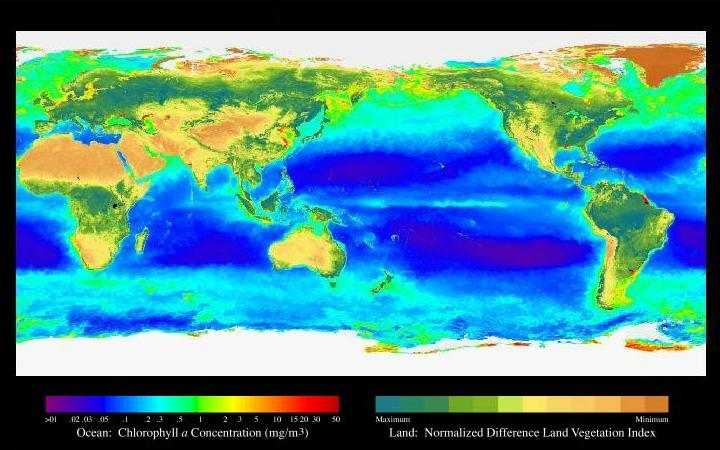
Average global chlorophyll distribution from 1997 to 1998. Warmer colors represent high chlorophyll, while cooler colors represent low chlorophyll. LNLC regions are low chlorophyll regions and appear dark blue on the map.

In subtropical gyres, and more generally in areas with low nutrient availability, phytoplankton communities are generally dominated by picoplankton (cells between 0.2 and 2μm). Picoplankton are smaller than other plankton that dominate higher nutrient regions, and their small volume means they have a larger surface area to volume ratio. Picoplankton can therefore take up nutrients more efficiently than larger plankton with smaller surface area to volume ratios. Picoplankton in subtropical gyres are highly grazed upon by nano- (2-20μm) and micro- (20-200μm) plankton, resulting in fast nutrient cycling, especially of nitrogen and phosphorus, and less export of organic matter and associated nutrients to the deep ocean via the biological pump.

Vertical mixing of the water column in winter and spring from storms in LNLC regions can deliver nutrients from deeper in the water column and favor transient increases in primary productivity within ocean gyres. During these events, larger phytoplankton species, such as diatoms, are favored when more nutrients are present, resulting in increased rates of organic matter export to the deep ocean via sinking particulates.

While generally low, observed primary productivity in gyres is higher than would be expected based on measured nutrient supply. The excess primary production can be explained by nitrogen fixing organisms that supply the remaining bioavailable nitrogen needed to support observed seasonal primary productivity. Low organic nitrogen levels in surface waters selects for nitrogen-fixing bacteria called diazotrophs. Nitrogen fixing organisms are often iron limited because nitrogenase has two iron-sulfur clusters. Thus, iron delivery via aeolian dust is often associated with increased primary productivity in the subtropical gyres and in the Mediterranean Sea.

== Variability of LNLC regions ==
Even with their overall low nutrient availability, LNLC regions are dynamic and experience seasonal variability in size and productivity. For example, the size of the North Atlantic Subtropical Gyre shrinks in winter and expands in summer. Long-term trends indicate that subtropical gyres in the northern hemisphere (North Pacific and North Atlantic) are expanding over time, and the subtropical gyres in the southern hemisphere (South Pacific) are growing weaker and more inconsistent. All LNLC subtropical gyres appear to have long-term trends of increasing sea-level height anomalies (SLA) and sea surface temperature (SST). Increasing SLA is indicative of deepening of both the thermocline and the nutricline, which reduces light and nutrient availability for the phytoplankton community in the mixed layer. Increased SST within LNLC regions contributes to increased stratification of the water column, which generally reduces nutrient inputs to the photic zone from deeper waters. Natural climatic variability events such as El Nino/Southern Oscillation (ENSO) and the Pacific Decadal Oscillation (PDO) influence SST in the global ocean with implications for primary productivity and phytoplankton communities. For example, the PDO warm phase increases SST in the equatorial pacific, causing increased stratification of the surface ocean that reduces nutrient availability and favors nitrogen fixing organisms.

Seasonal, decadal, and climate change driven variability in nutrient delivery and productivity in subtropical gyres are the subject of ongoing research efforts, as gyres play an important role in the global carbon cycle via the export of organic carbon from the surface ocean. As oceans warm due to climate change and thermal stratification increases, there is concern that all LNLC regions may become more oligotrophic and that other regions in the tropical and subtropical ocean may shift towards lower productivity LNLC systems. The influence of aeolian dust deposition on primary productivity in LNLC regions is also predicted to increase, as more frequent and higher intensity storm events and increasing aridity due to climate change deliver more dust to the ocean. Increased dust delivery to stratified and nitrogen-limited surface waters would favor nitrogen fixing organisms, such as diazotrophs, which would change the existing phytoplankton community structures and increase N_{2}-associated primary productivity.

== Example LNLC regions ==
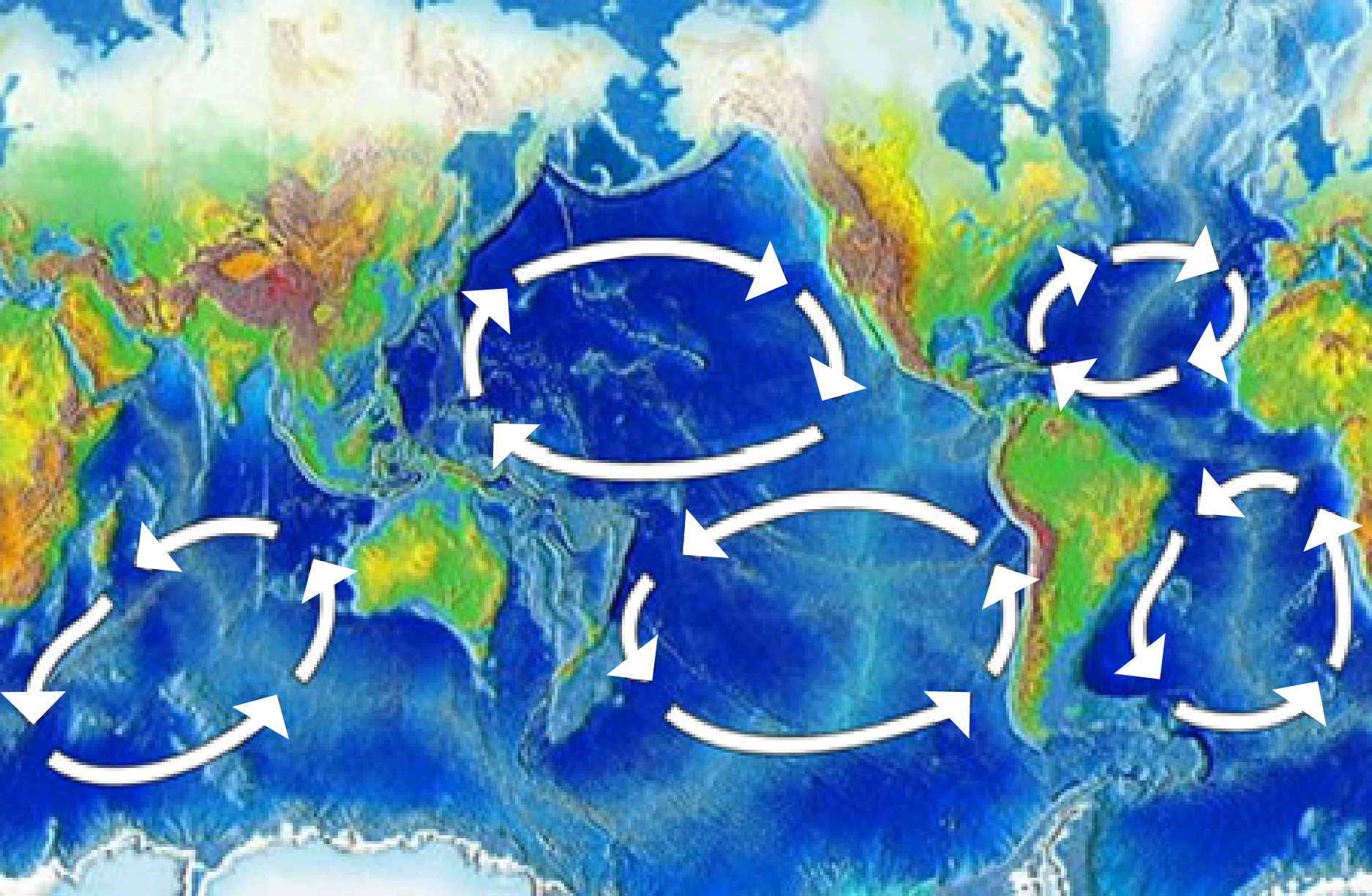
Map of ocean gyres. The major subtropical gyres in both hemispheres are large LNLC regions.

=== North Atlantic Subtropical Gyre ===
The Sargasso Sea is the region at the center of the North Atlantic subtropical gyre. Although the Sargasso Sea is generally oligotrophic, rates of primary production are much higher than would be expected of a region with limited nutrients, due to nitrogen fixation, physical forces, and seasonal dynamics. The North Atlantic receives a supply of phosphate (PO_{4}^{3-}) from the Arctic Ocean, while nitrate (NO_{3}^{−}) is produced by the nitrogen fixing cyanobacteria, Trichodesmium. Nitrogen fixation relies on a supply of iron (Fe), which is delivered to the Sargasso Sea via dust from the Sahara Desert. Nitrogen fixation rates in the region have increased since the 1970s, in part fueled by an increase in iron deposition due to expansion of the Sahara Desert. Wind-driven downwelling removes nutrients from the surface, but mesoscale eddies transport some of these nutrients back to the photic zone. Additionally, strong vertical mixing in the winter and spring brings nutrients to the photic zone, which causes a spring bloom of phytoplankton. Photosynthesis near the bottom of the photic zone, as opposed to closer to the surface, has also been shown to be an important contributor to primary production in the Sargasso Sea.

=== North Pacific Subtropical Gyre ===
The North Pacific Subtropical Gyre (NPSG) is one of the ocean's largest gyres. Primary production in these oligotrophic waters is generally limited by nitrogen, followed by phosphorus and iron. The NPSG's salinity stratification creates a two-layer ocean in which the upper layer (0–80 m) of the water column is nutrient limited and primary production is supported by nitrogen fixation and recycled nutrients, while the lower layer's production is light limited. Seasonal and decadal climatic events (ENSO and PDO) affect sea surface temperature and other nutrient patterns, influencing biological processes. For example, during the 1997-1998 ENSO event, NO_{3}^{−}-based production accounted for a larger fraction of primary production while particulate carbon export increased. This LNLC region is relatively well studied through the Hawaii Ocean Time-series (HOT) monitoring program (see Monitoring section).

=== South Pacific Subtropical Gyre ===
The South Pacific Subtropical Gyre lies in one of the most remote regions of the ocean, and consequently it has been poorly studied. From the studies that have investigated this region, we know that nitrogen is the most limiting nutrient, followed by phosphorus. Input of iron via dust transport is very limited to this region because of its distance from major landmasses. This aeolian flux of iron is 1 to 2 orders of magnitude lower than the central Atlantic and the concentration of dissolved iron across the gyre is only ~0.1 nM. For comparison, the average iron concentrations in the open ocean is ~0.7nM. Despite the low iron concentrations, only the border of the gyre demonstrates iron limitation, while the center does not. It's theorized that this is due to the high stability of the SPSG, which has allowed for phytoplankton populations to adapt to the highly oligotrophic conditions.

=== Mediterranean Sea ===
The Mediterranean Sea is generally oligotrophic with a strong west to east gradient of increasing oligotrophy; nutrients, chlorophyll-a concentrations, and rates of primary production all decrease from west to east. While most regions of the ocean are nitrogen-limited, the Mediterranean Sea is generally phosphorus-limited. The biogeochemical characteristics of the Mediterranean Sea are enforced by its anti-estuarine circulation: nutrient-depleted surface water from the Atlantic Ocean enters the Mediterranean via the Strait of Gibraltar, and dense, saline intermediate water formed in the eastern Mediterranean flows westward back into the Atlantic Ocean. This anti-estuarine circulation occurs because net evaporation in the Mediterranean is greater than net precipitation. In addition, because there is limited upwelling, bioavailable nutrients in the intermediate water are transported out of the Mediterranean Sea, leaving the surface water nutrient-depleted.

== Monitoring LNLC regions ==
Monitoring the characteristics of LNLC regions in the ocean is difficult due to the size, remoteness, and conditions of the regions. The ocean is a challenging environment for data collection because instruments and systems must withstand harsh conditions. Additionally, robust data collection and observation requires adequate funding and cooperation among nations and organizations, which has been difficult to achieve. Despite these challenges, there are collaborative projects and stations that utilize both in-situ and remotely sensed data to monitor the conditions of the global ocean.

=== Satellite instruments ===
Satellite imagery provides large-scale data to monitor the extent and characteristics of the subtropical gyres, and more broadly, the global oceans. Sensors used for ocean monitoring have spatial resolutions (pixel size) ranging from 200 meters to 4 kilometers, and have revisit frequencies ranging from 10 minutes to multiple days. Ocean color radiometry involves measuring the reflectance of light from ultraviolet, visible, and infrared regions of the electromagnetic spectrum. These data can be used to calculate chlorophyll-a concentrations after correcting for variables such as atmospheric scattering. Remotely-sensed ocean color data is calibrated and validated by in-situ measurements using various instruments, including MOBY (marine optical buoy), a sensor deployed near Lanai, Hawaii that measures light near and at the surface of the water. For a more comprehensive description of satellite instruments used for ocean color analysis, see ocean color.

=== Seagoing instruments and methods ===
Many types of instruments can be used to collect in-situ samples and data from the ocean. These instruments can be deployed on board ships, on moorings, on floats or drifters, and on ROVs. Example instruments and methods of collection include, but are not limited to, the following:

- CTD
- CTD rosette
- Bathythermograph (XBT)
- Sonar/sound systems
- Meteorological instruments
- Productivity arrays
- Sediment traps

=== Monitoring stations and programs ===
==== Station ALOHA (A Long-term Oligotrophic Habitat Assessment) ====
In 1988, Station ALOHA (A Long-term Oligotrophic Habitat Assessment) was established by the University of Hawaii with funding from the National Science Foundation. The goal of ALOHA is to collect data over a long temporal scale to better understand the physical and biogeochemical dynamics of the North Pacific Subtropical Gyre. The deep-water station (22°45′N 158°00′W) is the primary site for the HOT (Hawaii Ocean Time-series) program and provides researchers with water column data, including the thermohaline structure, primary production measurements, and chemical composition. Additionally, a collaborative project between the Woods Hole Oceanographic Institution and HOT, called WHOTS, collects data at an ALOHA surface mooring. WHOTS provides the atmospheric and upper-ocean data to HOT, including heat, water, and chemical fluxes between the ocean and atmosphere.

==== BATS (Bermuda Atlantic Time-series Study) ====
In 1988, BATS (Bermuda Atlantic Time-series Study) was established by the Bermuda Institute of Ocean Sciences to examine the oceanography and biogeochemical processes in the Sargasso Sea. The goal of BATS is to understand the role of the Sargasso Sea, and more broadly the North Atlantic Ocean, in the global carbon cycle. BATS is one of three time-series studies in the Sargasso Sea near Bermuda; Hydrostation 'S' collects physical oceanography data, and the OFP (Ocean Flux Program) focuses on particle transport in the region.

==== Mediterranean programs ====
MOOSE (Mediterranean Ocean Observing System for the Environment) is a France-based network of near-shore and off-shore stations that monitor the northwest Mediterranean Sea. The main purpose of MOOSE is to provide long time-series data for the study of the hydrologic cycle, marine ecosystems, and biogeochemical properties of the northwest Mediterranean.

MONGOOS (Mediterranean Oceanography Network for the Global Ocean Observing System) was established in 2012 as an extension of the Global Ocean Observing System (GOOS). MONGOOS is a collaborative network of over 40 European institutions with the goal of improving oceanographic research in the Mediterranean.
