= RV Atlantic Explorer =

American research vessel

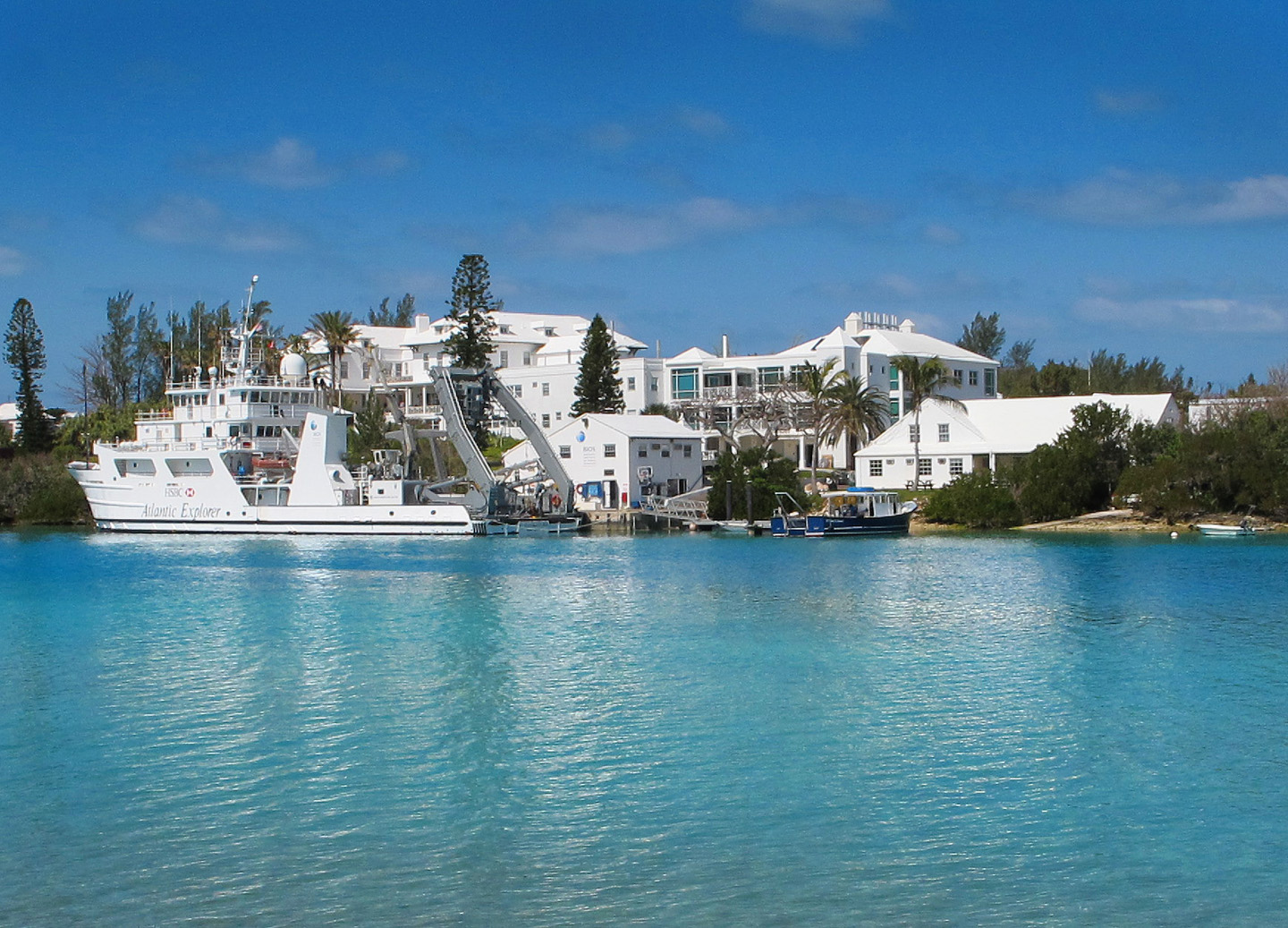
- Atlantic Explorer at the dock in Bermuda

History

Bermuda
- Name: Seward Johnson II (1982–2006); Bank of Bermuda Atlantic Explorer (2006–)
- Owner: Harbor Branch Oceanographic Institute (1982–2005); Bermuda Institute of Ocean Sciences (2005–)
- Launched: 1982
- Identification: IMO number: 8120014; MMSI number: 303591000; Callsign: WDC9417
- Status: Active

General characteristics
- Class & type: ABS
- Type: Oceanographic survey vessel
- Tonnage: 299
- Displacement: 790 tons (light); 1281 tons (full)
- Length: 171 ft (52 m)
- Beam: 38 ft (12 m)
- Draft: 11.5 ft (3.5 m)
- Installed power: 2 × 16V-149 Detroit diesel 1,880 shp (1,400 kW)
- Propulsion: Twin screws
- Speed: 10 knots (19 km/h; 12 mph) (cruise); 11 knots (20 km/h; 13 mph) (max)
- Range: 5,500 nmi (10,200 km; 6,300 mi)
- Endurance: 28 days
- Notes: MMSI 303591000

RV Atlantic Explorer is a twin-screw ocean vessel. It is owned and operated by the Bermuda Institute of Ocean Sciences (BIOS) in coordination with and as a part of the University-National Oceanographic Laboratory System (UNOLS) fleet. Atlantic Explorer is in compliance with US Coast Guard, UNOLS and American Bureau of Shipping (ABS) regulations as an uninspected oceanographic research vessel and is supported by the National Science Foundation (NSF). Its homeport is St. George's, Bermuda.

The ship was constructed in 1982 as a Class III ocean-going environmental research vessel. In it was known as Seward Johnson II, owned by Harbor Branch Oceanographic Institute and based in Ft. Pierce, Florida. BIOS purchased the vessel in October 2005, and modified it to better support the planned activities. This vessel replaced the previous BIOS research vessel, the smaller Weatherbird II, which had been in use since November 1989.

The most extensive modification made to the new ship was installation of a housing and a deployment station for the institute's 24-place Conductivity, Temperature and Depth (CTD) rosette package, which is extensively used for Bermuda Atlantic Time-series Study (BATS) operations. Modifications were completed by early 2006, and in March 2006 the ship was re-christened Bank of Bermuda Atlantic Explorer (the Bank of Bermuda had made a significant endowment which enabled the vessel's purchase).

The new vessel was still small enough to navigate Ferry Reach, Bermuda and dock at the new BIOS facility, but had significantly larger space for crew, researcher berths, and research areas. The deck space can accommodate four 20-foot (6.1 m) scientific vans or work boats. Buoys or instrument packets can be launched and retrieved.

== BIOS history ==
The Bermuda Institute of Ocean Sciences was established in Bermuda in 1903 as the Bermuda Biological Station for Research, Inc. and is a US non-profit research and educational institution. On 5 September 2006 it changed the Station's name to Bermuda Institute of Ocean Sciences.

In support of its expanded mission to provide well-equipped facilities and staff support for resident scientific staff, visiting scientists, faculty, and students from around the world, BIOS obtained the 168-foot (51 m) ship, and in 2006 converted it into the 171-foot (52 m) Atlantic Explorer.

Ready access from Bermuda to the deep ocean makes Atlantic Explorer ideal for short and extended cruises, for repetitive sampling and time series at the same station, and for all projects requiring analytical and other sophisticated shore facilities. Atlantic Explorer spends an average of 150 days per year at sea. Typical cruises run from day-trips to two week cruises.

== Specifications ==
Preparing the CTD for deployment from Atlantic Explorer

Atlantic Explorer is equipped with navigational, laboratory and mechanical facilities to support biological, geological, chemical and physical oceanographic research. Deploying and recovering deep ocean instrumentation moorings, conducting CTD casts, chemical sampling, and gear testing are among the number of operations within the ship's capabilities.

=== Ship specifications ===
- Built: 1982
- Last conversion: 2006
- Gross Tonnage: 299 (GT) (861 ITC)
- Net Tonnage: 203 (NT) (258 ITC)
- Weather limitations Station-keeping (CTD casts) Sea state 5 (30 kn wind)
- Personnel capacity: 12 crew berths
- Scientific berths: 22
- Total berths: 34
- Laboratory
  - Main laboratory: 325 sq ft (30.2 m^{2})
  - Aft laboratory: 250 sq ft (23 m^{2})
  - Forward laboratory: 230 sq ft (21 m^{2})
- CTD garage (Complete enclosure for CTD rosette): 190 sq ft (18 m^{2})
- Radiation laboratory (portable): 75 sq ft (7.0 m^{2})

== Usage ==
Requests for ship time may originate from scientists located at any university or institution. Ship costs for National Science Foundation (NSF) supported research projects are provided by NSF directly to BIOS as part of the annual NSF fleet support grants. Investigators seeking support from agencies other than NSF should include ship costs in their budgets to those agencies.
