= Vertical mixing =

Vertical mixing may refer to:

- an upward movement of air that occurs based on the movement of air masses in the Planetary boundary layer
- a process of mixing fresh and salt water in estuaries

== See also ==
- Convective mixing
