= MS Polarfront =

Norwegian weather ship

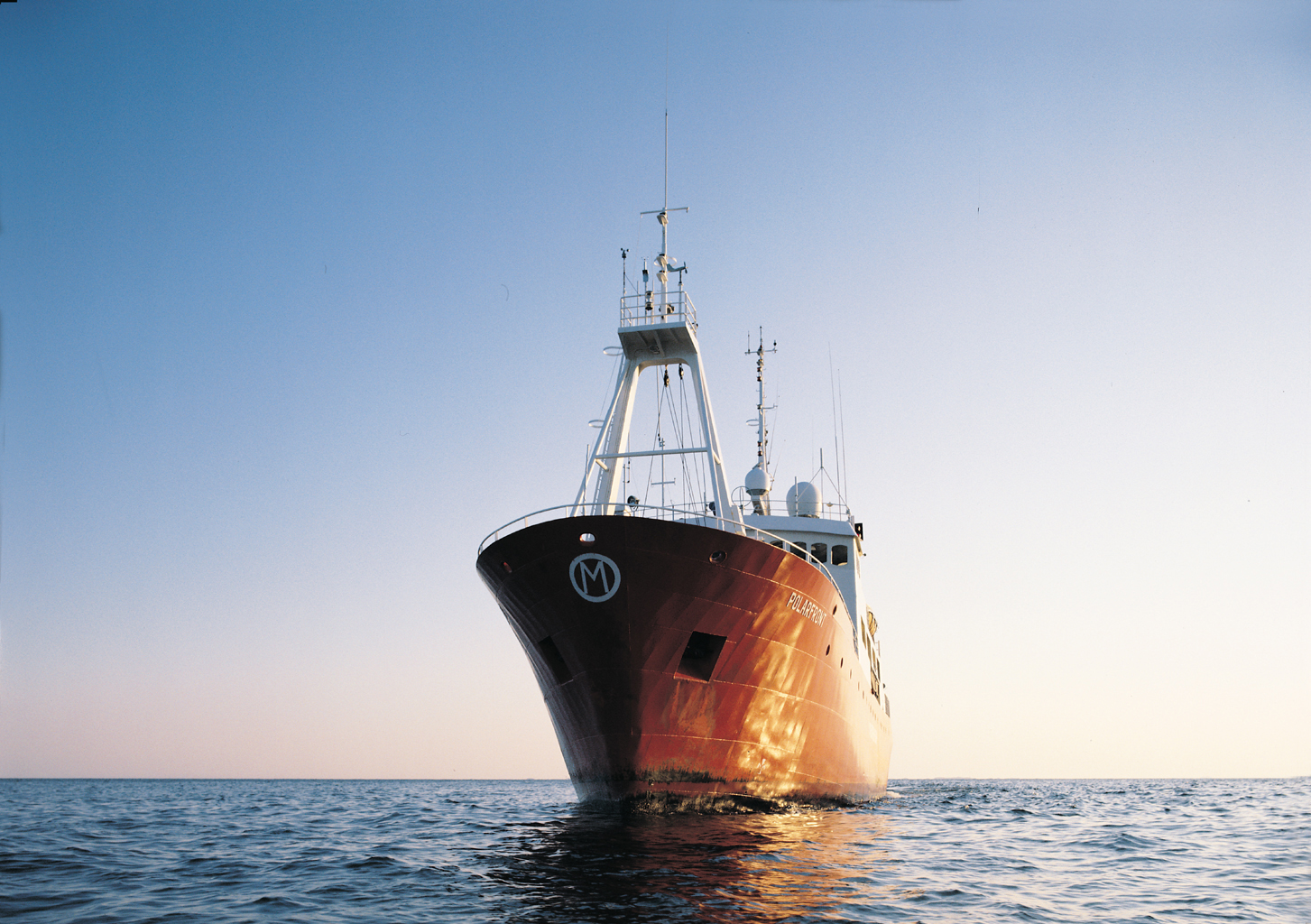
- The weather ship MS Polarfront at sea

History
- Name: Polarfront
- Owner: Latitude Blanche
- Port of registry: Marseille, France
- Builder: Mandal Slip & m.V. (hull); Fitjar Mek.Verksted AS (outfitting)
- Yard number: 57
- Laid down: 1 August 1975
- Launched: 1 March 1976
- Completed: 14 December 1976
- Identification: IMO number: 7608708; Call sign: FJYK; MMSI number: 228092600
- Status: In service

General characteristics
- Type: Expedition ship
- Tonnage: 927 GT; 278 NT
- Length: 54.25 m (178 ft)
- Beam: 10 m (33 ft)
- Draft: 4.368 m (14 ft)
- Depth: 7.87 m (26 ft)
- Ice class: DNV ICE-C
- Installed power: Wichmann 5AX
- Propulsion: Single shaft; controllable-pitch propeller

MS Polarfront was a Norwegian weather ship located in the North Atlantic Ocean. It was the last remaining weather ship in the world, maintained by the Norwegian Meteorological Institute.

A weather ship is a ship stationed in mid-ocean to make meteorological observations for weather forecasting. Since the 1960s this role has been largely superseded by satellites, long-range aircraft and weather buoys.

MS Polarfront was known as weather station M ("Mike"), and was located at 66°N, 02°E. Standard meteorological observations were performed on an hourly basis from the beginning of the 1960s.

On 27 February 2009, the cancellation of the station was announced. MS Polarfront was removed from service on 1 January 2010.

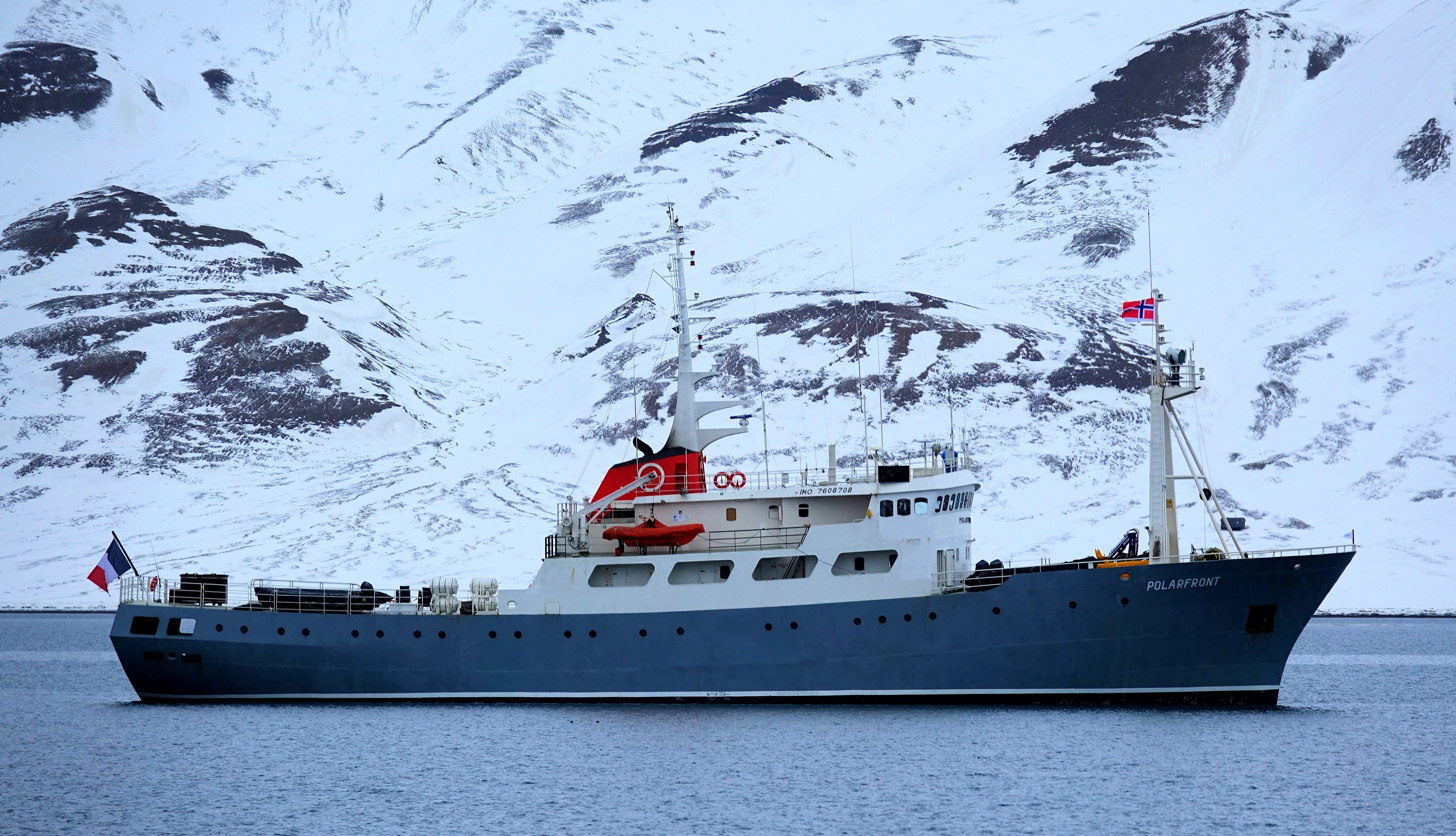
The ship serving as an expedition ship in 2022.

Since 28 June 2017, MS Polarfront has been owned and operated by the French shipping company Latitude Blanche for expedition purposes in high latitudes.

== History of station M ==
The International Civil Aviation Organization (ICAO) took the responsibility to operate an international network of ocean weather stations in the north Atlantic. The network was established in 1948 and consisted of 13 stations, including station M. The need for weather ships from civil aviation decreased gradually while meteorological societies still needed observations from the oceans. In 1974 the World Meteorological Organization (WMO) took responsibility for the four remaining stations. The international agreement about weather ships was ended in 1990. The United Kingdom and Norway continued the operation of one station each, station L ("Lima"), west of Scotland, and station M, in the Norwegian Sea. Station L was ended in the middle of the 1990s. Thus station M was the only one still remaining.

The first two weather ships to man station M were Polarfront I and Polarfront II. The Norwegian authorities were the ship owners. The ships were rebuilt Royal Navy corvettes (HMS Saxifrage and HMS Bryony). They served until 1974 and 1976, respectively. In 1974 the Norwegian state made an agreement with the shipping company Misje Offshore Marine AS in Bergen to hire a new and modern ship, which was given the name Polarfront.

For several years the ship alternated with the Dutch weather ship Cumulus to staff station M. From 1986 on Polarfront staffed station M alone. Each month Polarfront left the station for one to two days to take on a new crew and new supplies. Once a year, usually in early October, the ship stayed in its home port for a week to carry out maintenance.
