= Bermuda Atlantic Time-series Study =

Long-term oceanographic study by the Bermuda Institute of Ocean Sciences

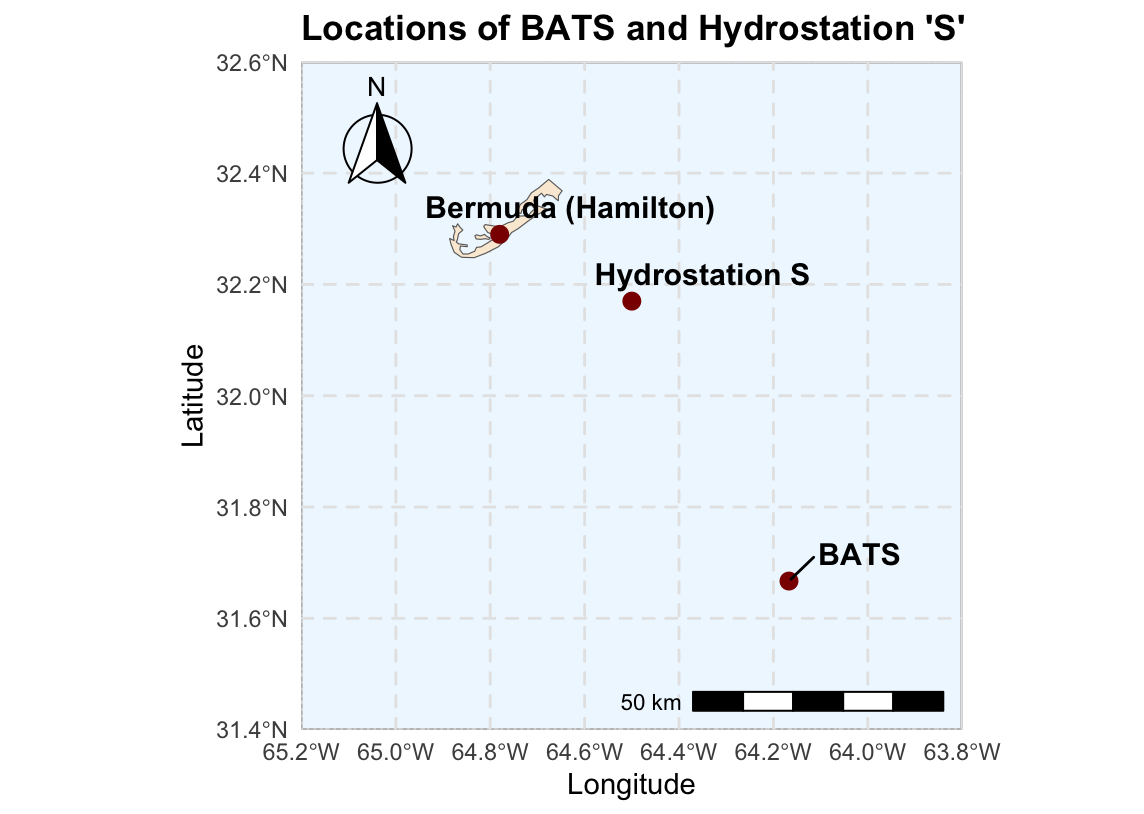
Map of BATS and Hydrostation S

The Bermuda Atlantic Time-series Study (BATS) is a long-term oceanographic study by the Bermuda Institute of Ocean Sciences (BIOS). It is located at 31°40′N 64°10′W / 31.667°N 64.167°W, approximately 80 km southeast of Bermuda. The cruise programme collects monthly samples of physical properties such as ocean temperature and salinity, but focuses on variables of biological or biogeochemical interest including: nutrients (nitrate, nitrite, phosphate and silicic acid), dissolved inorganic carbon, oxygen, HPLC of pigments, primary production and sediment trap flux. The Sargasso Sea that surrounds BATS is an oligotrophic body of water, characterized by high light penetration and low nutrient availability. Data collected along BATS identify this region of Sargasso Sea as having seasonal variability driven by vertical mixing, allowing nutrient rich water to diffuse near the surface during the winter months, causing microbial blooms. This bloom causes larger organisms such as phytoplankton to dominate during the spring and once the bloom dies and the summer stratification begins, picoplanktons dominate.

== History ==
=== Location ===
In 1954, Dr. Henry M. Stommel of Woods Hole Oceanographic Institution began conducting oceanographic research at Hydrostation 'S', a location that is approximately 25 km southeast of Bermuda. Oceanographic data was collected on biweekly intervals and included temperature, salinity, and dissolved oxygen measurements. Hydrostation 'S' is the longest-running oceanographic time-series study in the world and was originally referred to as "Panulirus hydrographic station", after the wooden research vessel R/V Panulirus that operated out of the Bermuda Biological Station (renamed the Bermuda Institute of Ocean Sciences). It was later renamed Hydrostation "S" to follow the naming convention of weather ship sites. In 1988, Bermuda Institute of Ocean Sciences (BIOS) joined forces with the U.S. Joint Global Ocean Flux Study (JGOFS) program to create the Bermuda Atlantic Time-series Study (BATS) alongside Hydrostation 'S' observations.

=== Projects and methods ===
From 1989 to 1994, monthly water samples were taken from the BATS station using Niskin or Go-Flo bottles from the surface to 250m. These samples were then analyzed using a flow cytometer for the identification and distribution of eukaryotic phytoplanktons such as Synechococcus and Prochlorococcus. This was one of the first long-term oceanographic programs to use flow cytometry, which allowed researchers to visually identify Prochlorococcus for the first time, since traditional microscopes used at other stations were too weak for identification. From this five-year project, Cyanobacteria populations were identified: Synechococcus peaked in the spring, while Prochlorococcus peaked in the summer and fall. It was also discovered that cells that bloomed in the spring were larger compared to those that bloomed in the summer/fall, as the spring bloomers were able to access more nutrients that had been mixed from the deep up to the surface due to the lack of thermal stratification in the winter. Although this project was done over three decades ago, the methods for collection and analysis are still considered the golden standard for phytoplankton count and identification. As technology advances with time, equipment has become more automated, autonomous, and faster. For example, it is now possible to complete flow cytometry without collecting water samples using a niskin bottle, as modern flow cytometers can be deployed on robotic platforms to analyze continuous streams of seawater. Even though the collection method of water has changed, the fundamental principle of the method remains the same.

=== Long-term impacts ===
The combined data collected from both Hydrostation ‘S’ and the BATS station over the past 70 years allows for the observation of long-term physical, chemical, and biological changes. This dataset not only reveals seasonal patterns but also provides insight into how climate change has affected the ocean over several decades. The dataset collected at the BATS station alone shows ocean surface temperatures have increased ~0.24˚C per decade since the 1980s, resulting in the ocean temperature to be ~1˚C warmer than it was 40 years ago. It was also found that current ocean oxygen levels have dropped 6%, and the water is 30% more acidic compared to what was observed in the 1980s. These long-term records not only show the impacts of global climate change but also help predict future changes and help develop mitigation strategies.

== Physical and chemical conditions ==
The Bermuda Atlantic Time Series has documented chemical and physical characteristics of the Sargasso Sea since 1988 from the surface to 4,200 km deep. Surface temperatures of the Sargasso Sea have a typical seasonal range of 9-11 °C, ranging from 30 °C to 18 °C. Surface salinity tends to vary seasonally by 0.2-0.3, with lower salinity occurring in the summer. Dissolved oxygen concentration also observes seasonal variation; the summer tends to have lower surface concentrations.

The data has acted as a reference point for ongoing oceanographic changes including surface warming, increased CO2, ocean acidification, increased salinity, and decreased dissolved oxygen. From 1983 to 2023, surface salinity has increased by approximately 0.136 per decade, which is higher than the previously documented 0.034 increase per decade. These changes in physical and chemical conditions have been implicated with climate change and have been suggested to have impacts on ocean primary production as well as microbial pathways. Additionally, over the past few decades, there has been a reduction in pelagic calcification.

== Biological conditions ==
=== Cyanobacteria characterization ===
The biological conditions of the Sargasso Sea, such as microbial abundance and diversity, are largely driven by the physical and chemical properties of the water. In general, vertical mixing in the winter and early spring led to the highest growth of microbial organisms. Specifically, Prochlorococcus typically reaches maximum concentrations from August to November and is often found at 60-80m, occurring just above the nitracline. In contrast, Synechococcus concentrations peak between March and May, with the highest concentrations occurring in the surface mixed layer. The maximum concentrations of these organisms tend to occur when the other is at a minimum. Additionally, Prochlorococcus tends to have a consistently higher concentration than Synechococcus. Data from this site has also detected variations in picoplankton cell size in relation to the nitracline. A shallow nitracline with a deep thermocline was associated with larger picoplankton size and fluorescence. In contrast, a deep nitracline with a higher thermocline resulted in smaller cells with less fluorescence.

=== Virus characterization ===
Based on epifluorescence microscopy and viral phoH gene sequencing, the abundance and composition of viruses in the Sargasso Sea has been characterized. Some of the detected operational taxonomic units (OTUs) are consistent regardless of depth or time, whereas others are inconsistently abundant. Viral abundance tends to peak in the summer between 60-100m, in correspondence with the Prochlorococcus blooms and Rhodobacteraceae. Within the same region, virioplankton abundance is negatively correlated with Synechococcus and SAR11. Data suggests that viral abundance is tightly related to Prochlorococcus in the mid-euphotic zone.

BATS has also been a site of in-depth virus characterization. In 2011, the genomes of two single-stranded DNA (ssDNA) phages were fully sequenced from the marine environment for the first time. These viruses include SARssφ1, frequently found at 80m depth, and SARssφ2, frequently found at 100m. Neither virus could be detected at surface depths. Further details such as host organisms and seasonal patterns are still unknown.

=== Dissolved organic matter distribution ===
Although not as variable as microbial and viral abundance, dissolved organic matter (DOM) tends to undergo seasonal variation. During winter and early spring, deep mixing results in inorganic materials reaching the surface and causing a phytoplankton bloom. Late spring to early autumn is typically oligotrophic at the surface. As the water column becomes more stratified from May to October, DOM tends to accumulate in the euphotic zone. Some specific metabolites have been detected at this site such as gonyol, a reduced organic sulfur molecule that appears to exhibit seasonal variation. Additionally, glucose 6-sulfate was detected for the first time in the oligotrophic ocean at the BATS site which may originate from algal cell walls.

== Discoveries and advancements ==
=== Microbial dynamics ===
A decade of high-resolution time-series data collected from The Bermuda Atlantic time-series Study (BATS) in the northwestern Sargasso Sea revealed recurring temporal and vertical patterns of virioplankton abundance in the open 300 m of the open ocean in unprecedented details. According to recent studies, using BATS data it was revealed recurring annual patterns in an oligotrophic (nutrient-poor) open ocean system that were previously a knowledge gap. The study revealed a regular annual cycle in viral abundance moved by physical oceanographic processes, particularly changes in water column stratification. During winter a deep convective mix redistributes viral particles through the entire water column and erodes the subsurface viral maximum that accumulated during summer months, deep convective mixing redistributes viral particles throughout the water column and are accumulated in deeper waters back throughout all depths. This process erodes the concentrated layer of viruses that typically forms during summer months. As stratification occurs in late spring and summer, viroplankton accumulate below the shallow mixed layer with peak concentrations occurring at depths of 60 to 100 meters in late summer while surface concentrations remain low. Previous it was believed in a strong positive correlation between viral abundance and chlorophyll, suggesting that picophytoplankton productivity was a primary driver of virioplankton dynamics. However, after BATS it was found that abundance was due to Prochlorococcus, the dominant picophytoplankton in the Sargasso region.

=== Ocean acidification ===
Forty years of observations collected at the Bermuda Atlantic Time-series Study (BATS) shows a continuing trend of surface warming, increase in salinity, loss of dissolved oxygen (DO), increase in carbon dioxide (CO2), and ocean acidification (OA) effects. Over this period, the ocean has warmed, increased in salinity, and lost DO, with no evidence of a reduction in the rates of change over time. Over this period ocean pH has decreased by ~0.1 pH which indicates a >30% increase in acidity. These acidification indicators show that the chemical conditions for calcification have become less favourable over the past 40 years and demonstrate an ongoing increase of acidity levels in the open sea. Suggesting significant change in marine species distributions, affecting directly multiple trophic levels of marine food webs

=== Biological carbon pump ===
The Bermuda Atlantic Time-series Study (BATS) provided critical insights into the biological carbon pump within oligotrophic ocean regions. Traditionally, carbon export is thought to occur mainly through the sinking of particulate organic carbon (POC). However, observations at BATS indicate that this process is weak suggesting that other pathways play a more important role than previously assumed. In particular, the movement of dissolved organic carbon (DOC) and physical processes such as mixing and ocean currents appear to be key mechanisms transporting carbon from the surface to deeper waters.

=== Oceanographic model development ===
BATS was established to uncover mysteries of the deep ocean layer by analyzing significant hydrographic and biological parameters throughout the water column, providing consistent data for validating time-dependent predictive models. Pursuing this goal has enabled BATS scientists and oceanographers worldwide to gain a deeper understanding of the ocean's physical, chemical and biological processes. BATS discoveries challenged established paradigms and has begun to reveal new observations about the ocean. As a long-standing goal the program aims to obtain long-term datasets that will continue to advance understanding of ocean biogeochemistry, with future research expected to resolve uncertainties surrounding the acceleration of warming, deoxygenation, and acidification in the North Atlantic.

=== Microbial discoveries ===
Along with analyses of physical and chemical conditions in the Sargasso Sea through the Bermuda Atlantic Time-Series, several noteworthy bacterial genera have been discovered and researched from samples taken along the time series. Many bacteria discovered along the time series transect are named for the sea they were discovered in, and in the order of discovery (i.e. SAR11 was the 11th sequenced isolate identified from the Sargasso Sea), rather than their taxonomy, though some are given names if they belong to highly described clades.

==== SAR11 ====
Perhaps the most well-known marine bacterial clade studied in the Sargasso Sea along the Bermuda Atlantic Time series line is SAR11. SAR11 represents a monophyletic subset of the Alphaproteobacteria, an abundant class throughout global oceans, representing an average of 25% of marine prokaryotes (some estimates even suggesting they contribute to up to 25% of total plankton) at any given time, and as a result is considered a key player in global carbon cycling patterns, responsible for up to 37% of carbon fixed by the ocean each day. Additionally, the presence of a variety of metabolic pathway genes in their genomes, including genes that support phosphorus metabolism, glycolysis and C1metabolism suggest that as a clade, they are capable of utilizing a variety of nutrient sources, as evidenced by their dominance in nutrient poor(oligotrophic) environments. Despite their variable metabolic pathways, SAR11 has a small genome size (1.3 million base pairs), with relatively consistent sequences across ecotypes. Various analyses of complete genomes of SAR11 strains continue to be an active area of research, leading to further discoveries about the ecology, evolution and spatiotemporal distribution of the clade.

==== SAR202 ====
SAR202 is a deep sea heterotrophic bacteria also discovered and characterised along the Bermuda Atlantic Time Series line. SAR202 represents bacteria of another abundant and widespread phylum, Chloroflexota. SAR202 is further subdivided into phylogenetic groups (I to VII) to account for its diversity. This clade is distributed throughout the water column, and exhibits variation along that gradient, with variations in metabolic gene presence and expression between the euphotic, mesopelagic and bathypelagic, generally with its highest overall abundance at the deep chlorophyll maximum. This finding was novel at the time of its discovery (1997), as it suggested that microbes exhibit ecological range limitations in the form of stratification within the water column. As the clade’s main carbon sources are obscure, carbon-containing molecules not accessible to other bacteria, SAR202 bacteria exhibit a variety of metabolic genes, including those that suggest its capacity for C1 oxidation, fatty acid beta-oxidation and sulfide-oxidation. This also points to the clade's participation in marine sulfur cycling.

==== Roseobacter type strains ====
Roseobacter represents another diverse clade of Alphaproteobacteria, persisting in a broad range of marine habitats. Several type strains have been isolated from oligotrophic waters. In order to isolate these bacteria, low-nutrient media was used, limiting bacteria dependent on abundant nutrients. Two strains in particular (Pelagibaca bermudensis HTCC2601, Maritimibacter alkaliphilus HTCC2654) were recently described through genome sequencing, and while they do share some traits common to other Roseobacter strains, they also possess some unique genes. Based on their genes, both strains likely perform glycolysis, the Krebs cycle and C1 metabolism, and can synthesize many amino acids, vitamins and cofactors. M. alkaphilus, so named due to its pH optimal range, which is highly basic (or alkaline), also appears to be capable of nitrate reduction.

== See also ==
- Hawaii Ocean Time-series (HOT)
- Weather ship
