= Hawaii Ocean Time-series =

Long-term oceanographic study based at the University of Hawaii at Manoa

The Hawaii Ocean Time-series (HOT) program is a long-term oceanographic study based at the University of Hawaii at Manoa. In 2015, the American Society for Microbiology designated the HOT Program's field site Station ALOHA (A Long-Term Oligotrophic Habitat Assessment; ()) a "Milestone in Microbiology", for playing "a key role in defining the discipline of microbial oceanography and educating the public about the vital role of marine microbes in global ecosystems."

Scientists working on the Hawaii Ocean Time-series (HOT) program have been making repeated observations of the hydrography, chemistry and biology of the water column at a station north of Oahu, Hawaii since October 1988. The objective of this research is to provide a comprehensive description of the ocean at a site representative of the North Pacific Subtropical Gyre. Cruises are made approximately once per month to the deep-water Station ALOHA located 100 km north of Oahu, Hawaii. Measurements of the thermohaline structure, water column chemistry, currents, optical properties, primary production, plankton community structure, and rates of particle export are made on each cruise. The HOT program also uses autonomous underwater vehicles, including floats and gliders, to collect data at Station ALOHA between cruises.

== Overview ==
HOT was founded to understand the processes controlling the fluxes of carbon and associated bioelements in the ocean and to document changes in the physical structure of the water column. To achieve this, the HOT program has several specific goals:

1. Quantify temporal (seasonal to decadal) changes in reservoirs and fluxes of carbon and associated bioelements (nitrogen, oxygen, phosphorus, and silicon).

2. Identify processes controlling air-sea carbon exchange, rates of carbon transformation through the planktonic food web, and fluxes of carbon into the ocean.

3. Form a multi-decadal baseline based on the gathered data that will allow researchers to decipher natural and anthropogenic influences on the NPSG ecosystem.

4. Provide scientific and logistical support to other scientific programs that benefit from the research and services performed by the HOT program. This includes projects implementing, testing, and validating new methodologies, models, and transformative ocean sampling technologies.

The dissolved inorganic carbon data set that has been accumulated over the course of the HOT program shows the increase of carbon dioxide in the surface waters of the Pacific and subsequent acidification of the ocean. The data collected by these cruises are available online.

The 200th cruise of the HOT program was in 2008. HOT recently celebrated its 25th year in operation, with the 250th research cruise occurring in March 2013.

== Station ALOHA ==
=== Environment ===
Ocean station ALOHA is located in a warm oligotrophic (low nutrient) region and has low standing stocks of chlorophyll, nitrate and overall biomass. An environment such as the one at ocean station ALOHA is relevant to study as oligotrophic subtropical gyre ecosystems cover a large portion of the Earth’s surface. Ocean stations like ALOHA allow for long term studies to take place which results in a deeper understanding of the impacts of human induced climate change on marine ecosystems as well as the genetic diversity and evolution of marine organisms.

=== Cruises ===
Station ALOHA is a deep water (~4,800 m (15,700 ft)) location approximately 100 km (62 mi) north of the Hawaiian Island of Oahu. Thus, the region is far enough from land to be free of coastal ocean dynamics and terrestrial inputs, but close enough to a major port (Honolulu) to make relatively short duration (less than five days) near-monthly cruises logistically and financially feasible. Sampling at this site occurs within a 10 km (6.2 mi) radius around the center of the station.

Each HOT cruise begins with a stop at a coastal station south of the island of Oahu, approximately 10 km (6.2 mi) off Kahe Point (21° 20.6'N, 158° 16.4'W) in 1500 m of water. Station Kahe (termed Station 1) is used to test equipment and train new personnel before departing for Station ALOHA. Since August 2004, Station ALOHA has also been home to a surface mooring outfitted for meteorological and upper ocean measurements; this mooring, named WHOTS (also termed Station 50), is a collaborative project between Woods Hole Oceanographic Institution and HOT. WHOTS provides long-term, high-quality air-sea fluxes as a coordinated part of HOT, contributing to the program's goals of observing heat, fresh water and chemical fluxes. In 2011, the ALOHA Cabled Observatory (ACO) became operational. This instrumented fiber optic cabled observatory provides power and communications to the seabed (4,728 m (15,512 ft)). The ACO is currently configured with an array of thermistors, current meters, conductivity sensors, two hydrophones, and a video camera.

== Field sampling strategy ==
A core suite of environmental variables was selected at the start of the program that is expected to display detectable change on time scales of several days to one decade. Since 1988, the interdisciplinary station work has included physical, chemical, biological and sedimentological observations and rate measurements. The initial phase of the HOT program (October 1988 – February 1991) was entirely supported by research vessels, with the exception of the availability of existing satellite and ocean buoy sea surface data. In February 1991, an array of inverted echosounders (IES) was deployed around Station ALOHA and in June 1992, a sequencing sediment trap mooring was deployed a few km north of it. In 1993, the IES network was replaced with two strategically positioned instruments: one at Station ALOHA and the other at the coastal station Kaena. A physical-biogeochemical mooring (known as HALE-ALOHA) was deployed from January 1997 to June 2000 for high frequency atmospheric and oceanic observations.

HOT relies on the University-National Oceanographic Laboratory System research vessel Kilo Moana operated by the University of Hawaii for most of the near-monthly sampling expeditions. When at Station ALOHA, a variety of sampling strategies is used to capture the range of physical and biogeochemical dynamics natural to the NPSG ecosystem. These strategies include high resolution conductivity-temperature-depth (CTD) profiles, biogeochemical analyses of discrete water samples, in situ vertically profiling bio-optical instrumentation, free-drifting arrays for determinations of primary production and particle fluxes, deep ocean sediment traps, and oblique plankton net tows.

The suite of core measurements conducted by HOT has remained largely unchanged over the program's lifetime. On each HOT cruise, samples are collected from the surface ocean to near the sea bed (~4,800 m), with the most intensive sampling occurring in the upper 1,000 m. HOT utilizes a “burst” vertical profiling strategy where physical and biogeochemical properties are measured at 3 hour intervals over a 36-hour period, covering 3 semi-diurnal tidal cycles and 1 inertial period (~31 hours). This approach captures variability in ocean dynamics due to internal tides around Station ALOHA. It is designed to assess variability on time scales of a few hours to a few years. High frequency variability (less than 6 hours) and variability on time scales of between 3–60 days are not adequately sampled at the present time.

== Microbial Community Structures ==
=== Dominant Taxa ===
Cyanobacteria, SAR11 alphaproteobacteria, and planktonic archaea were identified as dominant microbial taxa near Station ALOHA.

Data from the HOTS shows that cyanobacteria, which includes Prochlorococcus sp. and Synechococcus sp., made up a significant portion of the prokaryotic community in surface waters. Prochlorococcus was identified as the most abundant phototroph in the ocean, including at Station ALOHA. While cyanobacteria is dominant near the surface, its abundance decreases with depth.

Samples from Station ALOHA also provided information about the distribution of SAR11, which accounts for up to 50% of surface microbes in the ocean and were identified to be the most abundant marine microbe in oceans worldwide.

Planktonic archaea, which were previously believed to exist in extreme environments only, were found to be low in abundance in surface waters, but have equal abundance to bacteria in great depths at Station ALOHA. Specifically, Actinobacteria, Chloroflexi and Verrucomicrobia taxa increased in abundance with depth while Alphaproteobacteria and Gammaproteobacteria abundant throughout the water column.

=== Distribution ===
Depth plays a major role in the microbial distribution around Station ALOHA, resulting in vertical stratification of microbial communities. Data collected shows the level of genes required for photosynthesis were highest in the epipelagic zone, suggesting that the surface waters are dominated by photosynthetic organisms. Additionally, surface water microbial communities have also shown to be more variable in time compared to communities in deeper ocean waters due to the greater stability found in layers below the euphotic zone. At greater depths, there is a shift towards chemolithotrophic metabolism, such as to Marine Group I Crenarchea, which uses ammonia oxidation. As depth increases, there is a decrease in species diversity but increase in phylum diversity, suggesting that a broader range of metabolic pathways can sustain life in nutrient-limited environments in the deep ocean. For example, there has been evidence demonstrating higher levels of chemolithotrophic activities in the mesopelagic zone of the North Pacific Subtropical Gyre, such as carbon fixation and sulfur oxidation.

=== Ecology ===
Research from Station ALOHA has also provided information on the microhabitat-specific metagenomic differences between sinking-particle-associated (SPA) and free-living (FL) microbes in an oligotrophic ocean environment. Depending on the level of organic and inorganic material availability, different types of microbes were found to adopt different adaptations. Particle-associated microbe genomes encoded for a larger diversity of transporters and polymer-degrading enzymes than free-living bacteria, though this diversity is found to decrease with increasing depth Free-living particles do not undergo these changes, for instead they see increased genomic size with depth, driven by the increased availability in inorganic nitrogen. Corresponding to this, FL microbe genomes primarily encode for mannopine transporters, with mannopine acting as a source of carbon, energy and nitrogen for these bacteria.

Additional research collected from Station ALOHA has also demonstrated a relationship between wind and solar irradiance with alpha and beta diversity respectively. Possible mechanisms for how wind speeds affect microbial alpha diversity has not been fully determined, but hypotheses have been suggested. For example, wind-driven mixing is known to occur out in the open ocean, thus the increases in microbial alpha diversity could be a result of increasing the rate organisms are able to cycle through different light conditions within the mixed layer and thus impacting the microbial community composition. In regards to the solar irradiance, it was found to correlate with beta diversity in a non-abundance based way, similar to how wind impacts alpha diversity, impacting the microbial community composition itself.

== Research and Scientific findings ==
The 25 year record of ocean carbon measurements at Station ALOHA document that the partial pressure of CO_{2} (pCO_{2}) in the mixed layer is increasing at a rate slightly greater than the trend observed in the atmosphere. This has been accompanied by progressive decreases in seawater pH. Although the effect of anthropogenic CO_{2} is evidenced by long-term decreases in seawater pH throughout the upper 600 m, the rate of acidification at Station ALOHA varies with depth. For example, in the upper mesopelagic waters (~160–310 m) pH is decreasing at nearly twice the rate observed in the surface waters. Such depth-dependent differences in acidification are due to a combination of regional differences in time-varying climate signatures, mixing, and changes in biological activity.

=== Carbon Cycling ===
At the ALOHA station, the carbon cycle is influenced by air-sea carbon dioxide exchange and the biological uptake and remineralization of organic carbon in the water . The partial pressure of carbon dioxide (pCO₂) in surface seawater is typically lower than that in the atmosphere, resulting in net absorption of carbon dioxide by the ocean. Dissolved carbon dioxide participates in the carbonate system, forming carbonic acid, bicarbonate (HCO₃⁻), and carbonate (CO₃²⁻).

Dissolved inorganic carbon (DIC) concentration increases with depth, reaching a maximum between 800 and 1000 meters, while pH decreases from approximately 8.1 at the surface to 7.6 at deeper depths.

Physical processes also play a significant role. Seasonal mixing and temperature variations drive most of the changes in surface carbon dioxide partial pressure and pH, while water mass transport and settling particles redistribute carbon to the deep sea. These processes lead to significant seasonal and inter-annual variations in the carbon cycle.

Time-series measurements show a long-term upward trend in ocean carbon content. The rate of increase in surface carbon dioxide partial pressure (pCO₂) is comparable to the rate of increase in atmospheric carbon dioxide concentration, while the pH of surface seawater decreases by approximately 0.0019 units per year. These trends collectively indicate that the carbon cycle at the ALOHA station is influenced by both short-term physical and biological factors and long-term changes related to rising atmospheric carbon dioxide concentrations.

=== Nutrient Cycling ===
The ALOHA station is located in the oligotrophic North Pacific subtropical circulation (NPSG). Its upper ocean is characterized by extremely low concentrations of inorganic nutrients, and persistent stratification separates the surface mixed layer from the deeper nutrient-rich waters, leading to chronic nutrient depletion. Vertical profiles show that both nitrogen and phosphorus concentrations increase with depth, with a nutricline located between approximately 200 and 600 meters.

Inorganic nitrogen concentrations in the surface water are extremely low, exhibiting significant variability across seasonal and inter-annual timescales. Due to strong mixing and intermittent nutrient inputs, surface nitrogen levels are typically higher in winter than in summer. Physical processes such as eddies can also transport nutrients from the deeper layers to the upper ocean. However, overall, upward diffusion of nitrogen is limited under stratified conditions.

Surface phosphorus concentrations are also extremely low; however, unlike nitrogen, they do not exhibit persistent seasonal variations associated with mixing events. Long-term observations have shown that surface phosphorus content is primarily influenced by biological uptake and internal cycling processes, exhibiting significant inter-annual variations, such as periods of continuous decline.

In the euphotic zone, dissolved organic nitrogen (DON) and dissolved organic phosphorus (DOP) are major components of the total nutrient pool, buffering short-term fluctuations in inorganic nutrient supply. Microorganisms, including bacteria, archaea, and small phytoplankton, play a crucial role in regulating and driving the nutrient cycle in seawater. Microbial communities regulate nutrient cycling in the water through processes such as absorption, transformation, and remineralization.

=== Biological Pump and Carbon Export ===
In the oligotrophic marine area studied at Station ALOHA, the biological pump, primarily driven by sinking particles, serves as the main channel connecting surface production and the deep-sea ecosystem, and is the primary mechanism for transferring carbon from the euphotic zone to deeper waters. The production of particulate organic matter (POM) is regulated by microorganisms and their ecosystems. Because these particles originate from multiple sources, their composition is heterogeneous.

Long-term observations at Station ALOHA have also shown significant seasonal and inter-annual variations in particulate carbon export, with summer typically observing higher export, sometimes differing by up to three times. This seasonal enhancement, known as the "summer export pulse," is strongly linked to surface productivity. However, inter-annual variations are also significant; they can even lead to weaker or absent seasonal variations. This indicates that carbon export is influenced by both ecological and environmental factors, rather than following a strictly periodic pattern.

=== Metagenomic Analysis ===
Novel research has emerged from the Hawaiian Ocean Time-series (HOTS) program like the discovery of marine archaea, new metabolic pathways such as proteorhodopsin genes being expressed in E. coli, and the aerobic production of methane from the catabolism of methylphosphonate by Trichodesmium.

Studies from a station like Ocean Station ALOHA can also be used to compare how various microbes function in different environments. For example, a comparison between co-existing populations of two common ocean bacteria Prochlorococcus spp. and Pelagibacter spp. at the Bermuda Atlantic Time-series Study (BATS) station and ALOHA station showed visible differences in genes that encode proteins used for phosphate acquisition and metabolism. The species at the BATS station showed increased genes for phosphate uptake as they adapted to the lower phosphate concentration found at the BATS station.

Other metagenomic research has been done to compare the composition and relative abundance of protists between samples collected by the Hawaiian Ocean Time-series program and the Eastern Tropical North and South Pacific oxygen-deficient zones (ODZs). This study had found that while there is a large drop in abundance for various types of fungi and protists in the ODZ, such as choanoflagellates and ciliates, such phenomenon is not seen in data collected from the oxic mesopelagic zone at HOTS.

== See also ==
- Bermuda Atlantic Time-series Study (BATS)
- Ocean weather station
