= Bermuda Institute of Ocean Sciences =

Non-profit marine science institute

Coordinates: 32.3705°N 64.6966°W

ASU Bermuda Institute of Ocean Sciences
- Formation: 1903
- Founded at: Flatts Inlet in Bermuda
- Headquarters: 17 Biological Station Ferry Reach St.George's GE 01 Bermuda
- President and Chief Executive Officer: William B. Curry, PhD
- Subsidiaries: Ocean Observations
- Website: https://bios.asu.edu
- Formerly called: Bermuda Biological Station for Research

The ASU Bermuda Institute of Ocean Sciences (known as ASU BIOS) is a non-profit marine science and education institute located in Ferry Reach, St. George's, Bermuda and affiliated with the Julie Ann Wrigley Global Futures Laboratory at Arizona State University. The institute, founded in 1903 as the Bermuda Biological Station, hosts a full-time faculty of oceanographers, biologists, and environmental scientists, graduate and undergraduate students, K-12 groups, and Road Scholar (formerly Elderhostel) groups. ASU BIOS's strategic mid-Atlantic Ocean location has at its doorstep a diverse marine environment, with close proximity to deep ocean as well as coral reef and near shore habitats.

Prior to 5 September 2006, ASU BIOS was known as the Bermuda Biological Station for Research (BBSR).

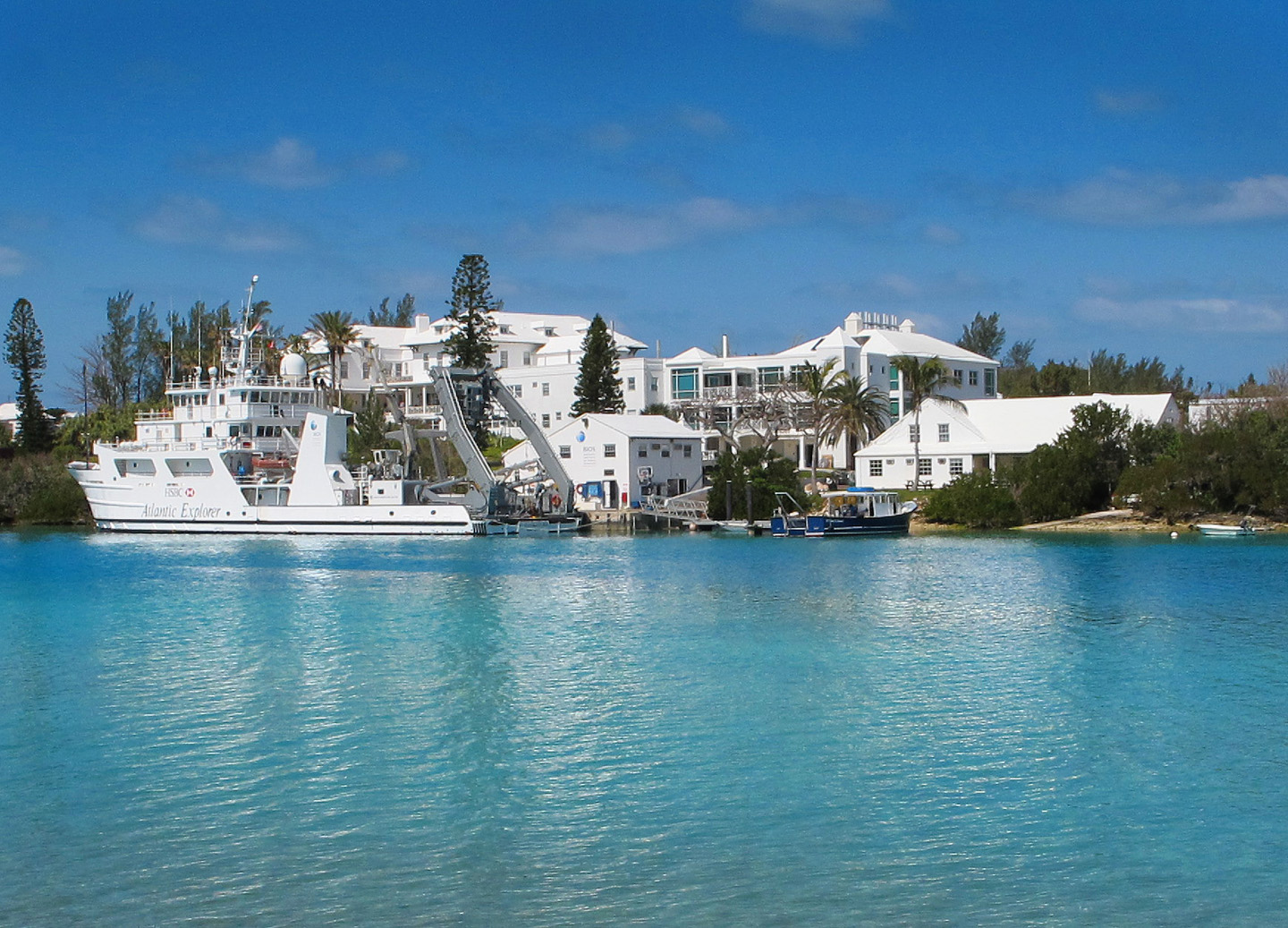
R/V Atlantic Explorer at the dock.

== Research programs ==
ASU BIOS has a range of research programs investigating the role of the ocean in global climate, the health of coral reefs, and the connection between healthy oceans and healthy people. The geographical range is not restricted to the waters around Bermuda, but also extends to the Arctic, the Antarctic and the tropics. The Center for Integrated Ocean Observations program is an international collaboration of oceanographers and climate scientists. Taking advantage of Bermuda's unique position, their goal is to better understand the biological, chemical and physical processes that take place in the ocean and the ocean's role in regulating the Earth's climate. The International Center for Ocean and Human Health is designed to address both health of the ocean (such as pollution threats) and health from the ocean (including nutrients and pharmaceutical applications). Working with experts on ocean acidification, coral reefs, ecotoxicology, algal biofuel, and the carbon cycle. The Risk Prediction Initiative (RPI) program brings climate scientists and insurers together to collaborate to identify new directions for climate research. Matching the institute's unique research ability with Bermuda's insurance market, this business-science partnership provides rapid, current and comprehensive information to those parts of the business community affected by environmental change.

== Research vessel ==
Preparing the CTD for deployment from the R/V Atlantic Explorer

The R/V Atlantic Explorer is a research vessel owned and operated by the ASU Bermuda Institute of Ocean Sciences and is supported by the National Science Foundation and ASU BIOS. It operates in compliance with United States Coast Guard, University-National Oceanographic Laboratory System (UNOLS) and American Bureau of Shipping (ABS) rules and regulations.

The 168 ft Atlantic Explorer is equipped with navigation, laboratory and mechanical systems and equipment to support biological, geological, chemical and physical oceanographic research. Deploying and recovering deep ocean instrumentation moorings, conducting CTD casts, chemical sampling, and gear testing are among the number of operations within the ship's capabilities.

Ready access of two hours or more from Bermuda to the deep ocean makes the Atlantic Explorer useful for both short and extended cruises, for repetitive sampling and time-series research, and for projects requiring analytical and other sophisticated shore facilities.

== History ==
Founded in 1903 and incorporated in New York as a US not-for-profit institution in 1926, in its initial years ASU BIOS was a seasonal field station for visiting zoologists and biologists to take advantage of Bermuda's diverse marine environment. After the Second World War, BIOS became a year-round research center, anchored by the establishment in 1954 of Hydrostation 'S': regular deep ocean observations of a single point in the ocean that continue today, creating the longest continuous oceanic database in the world. During the following few decades, increasing numbers of visiting scientists brought an increased emphasis on biological and geological studies.

Resident scientific programs strengthened in the 1980s as the institute became a key link in an international effort to describe and understand the ocean-atmosphere system. In 1998, BIOS established the International Center for Ocean and Human Health, considered the first of its kind to explore the ocean health/human health connection on a global scale. The Center for Integrated Ocean Observations was established in 1999 and uses new technologies to build on a century of marine research at the institute.

Other notable dates:

1928 to 1939, oceanographic explorer William Beebe worked in Bermuda. During those years, Beebe visited ASU BIOS (then the Bermuda Biological Station for Research) and worked with BIOS staff. While Beebe is best remembered for his Bathysphere dives at Nonsuch Island, he made a number of other significant scientific contributions during his stay, mainly the discovery of new species of marine life.

1978: Oceanic Flux Program begins, the longest record of deep ocean sediment-trap studies in the world.

1988: Bermuda Atlantic Time-series Study (BATS) begins, establishing ASU BIOS as one of two US centers for time-series studies on temporal variability in the ocean and providing key data on changing climate and the ocean.

1994: Risk Prediction Initiative, a collaboration between climate scientists and reinsurers, is established.

2021: The Bermuda Institute of Ocean Sciences joins Arizona State University as a research unit within the Julie Ann Wrigley Global Futures Laboratory, enhancing its position to explore research and applied solutions in the marine science sector, aligning with the Global Futures Laboratory's mission to shape a future in which life thrives on a healthy planet.

2022: The ASU College of Global Futures announces the launch of its fourth school, the School of Ocean Futures, with a substantial portion of its faculty, research and field study based at ASU BIOS.

== See also ==
- Bermuda Atlantic Time-series Study
