= Deep chlorophyll maximum =

Subsurface maximum in the concentration of chlorophyll

The deep chlorophyll maximum (DCM), also called the subsurface chlorophyll maximum, is the region below the surface of water with the maximum concentration of chlorophyll. The DCM generally exists at the same depth as the nutricline, the region of the ocean where the greatest change in the nutrient concentration occurs with depth.

A DCM is not always present - sometimes there is more chlorophyll at the surface than at any greater depth - but it is a common feature of most aquatic ecosystems, especially in regions of strong thermal stratification. The depth, thickness, intensity, composition, and persistence of DCMs vary widely.

A common way of determining the DCM is through the use of a CTD rosette, an underwater instrument that measures various parameters of water at specific depths. The location and formation of the DCM depends on multiple factors, such as the resident organisms' nutritional needs and light availability. Some organisms have adapted to lower levels of light through increasing its cellular chlorophyll amounts, and others have adapted by migrating vertically with varying nutrient and light levels. The DCM species composition vary with water chemistry, location, seasonality, and depth. Not only is there a difference in DCM species composition between oceans and lakes, variation is also present within different oceans and lakes. Because the DCM holds much of the world's primary productivity, it plays a significant role in nutrient cycling, the flow of energy, and biogeochemical cycles.

== Measurements ==
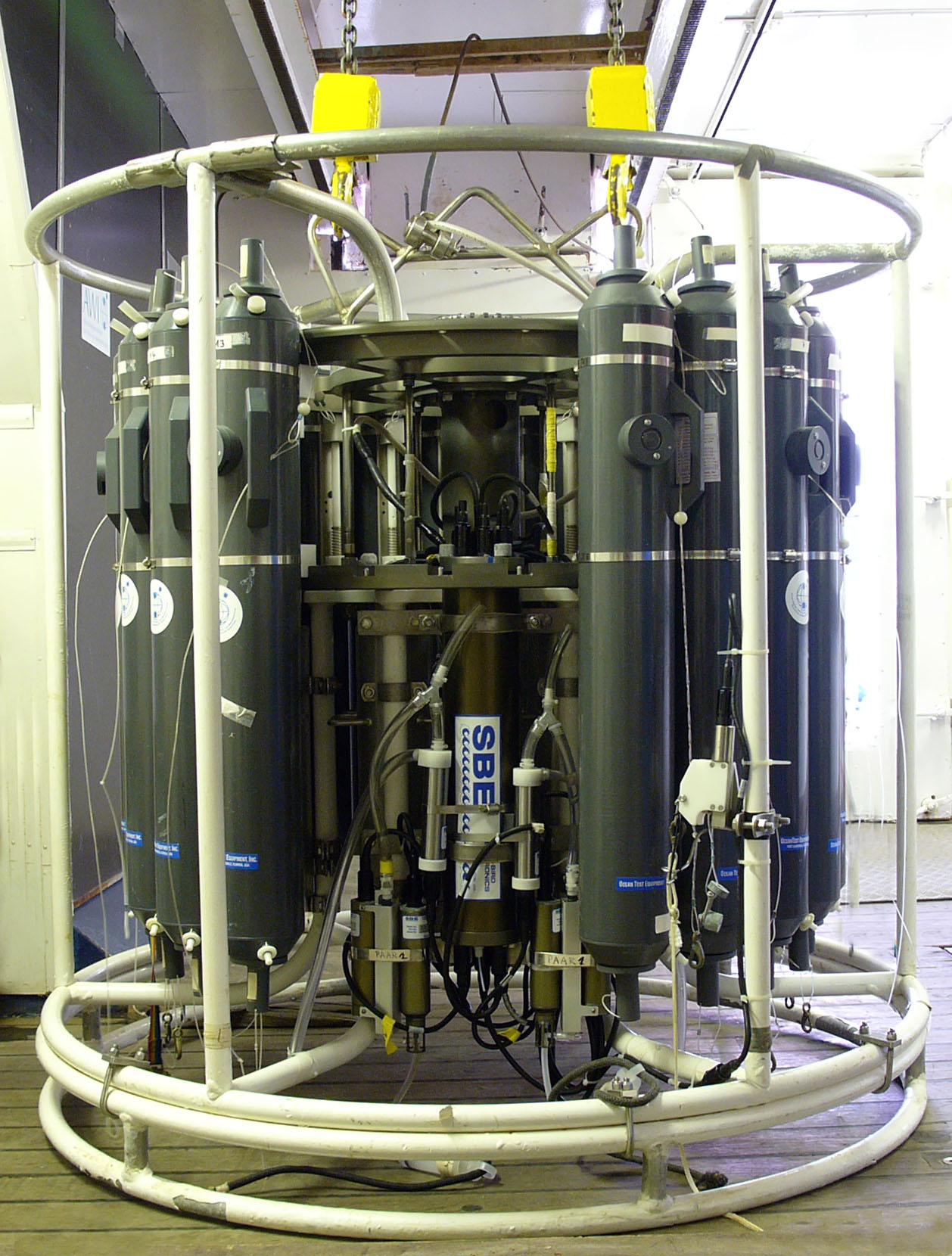
Fig. 1 Field photo of a CTD rosette, which measures the conductivity, temperature, and pressure of water samples.

The DCM is often located tens of meters below the surface, and cannot be observed by using traditional satellite remote sensing methods. Estimates of primary productivity are often made via these remote sensing methods coupled with statistical models, though these statistical calculations may not have accurately included production in the DCM. The DCM of a study area can be determined in-situ through the use of an underwater instrument (CTD rosette with niskin bottles) to measure various parameters such as salinity (including dissolved nutrients), temperature, pressure, and chlorophyll fluorescence. Collected water samples can be used to determine phytoplankton cell counts. These measurements can then be converted into chlorophyll concentrations, phytoplankton biomass, and phytoplankton productivity. Another way to estimate primary productivity in the DCM is to create a simulation of the DCM formation in a region by making a 3D model of the region. This can be done if sufficient hydrodynamic and biogeochemical data exists for that ocean region.

== Location and formation ==
Since its initial discovery, oceanographers have presented various theories to explain the formation of deep chlorophyll maxima.

=== Abiotic factors ===
In-situ studies have determined that the depth of DCM formation is primarily dependent on light attenuation levels, and the depth of the nutricline, although thermal stratification also plays a role. In lakes, the thickness of the DCM layer is mainly controlled by the sizes and maximum depths of lakes.

The DCM forms near the nutricline and the bottom of the photic zone. Phytoplankton growth in the DCM is limited by both nutrient and light availability, therefore either increased nutrient input, or increased light availability to the DCM can in turn increase the phytoplankton growth rate.

The location and formation of the DCM also depends on season. In the Mediterranean Sea, the DCM is present in the summer due to water stratification, and is rare in the winter due to deep mixing. The DCM can be present at shallower depths in the winter and early spring due to light limitation and higher nutrient availability in shallower regions due to mixing, and at lower depths during the summer and early fall as nutrients in the surface water are depleted by primary producers and stronger irradiance allows light to penetrate to greater depths.

The vertical mixing of limiting nutrients across the thermocline is a key process in supporting the deep water chlorophyll maximum. This mixing can be driven by a number of processes linked to wind driven oscillations, internal tides and entrainment through the deepening of the surface mixed layer. In shallow seasonally stratified seas boundary layer processes can also drive mixing of limiting nutrients across the thermocline.

=== Biotic factors ===
The formation of a DCM correlates with a number of biological processes, affecting nutrient cycling for local heterotrophic bacteria and composition of specialized phytoplankton.

==== Adaptations to light levels ====
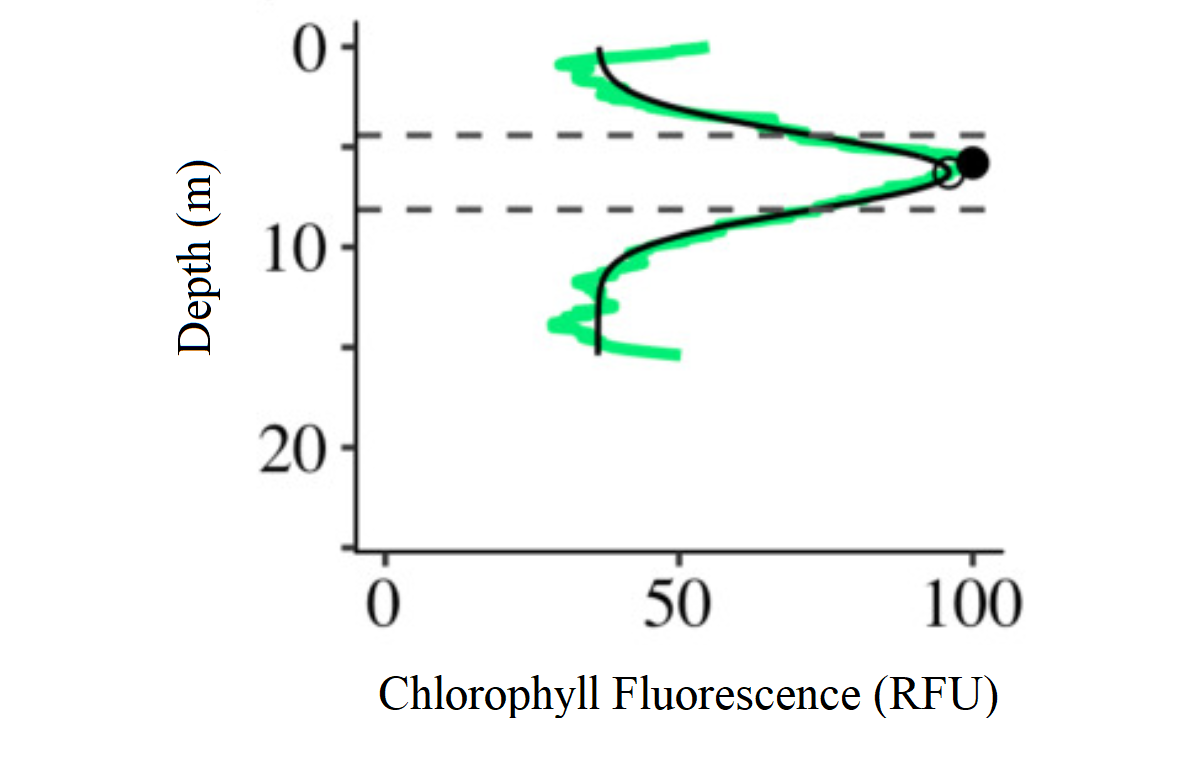
Fig. 2. Example of the level of chlorophyll fluorescence at different water depths.

Light attenuation factors have been shown to be quite predictive of the DCM depth, since the phytoplankton present in the region require sufficient sunlight for growth, resulting in a DCM that is generally found in the euphotic zone. However, if the phytoplankton population has adapted to lower light environments, the DCM can also be located in the aphotic zone. The high chlorophyll concentration at the DCM is due to the high number of phytoplankton that have adapted to functioning in low light conditions.

To adapt to low light conditions, some phytoplankton populations have been found to have increased amounts of chlorophyll counts per cell, which contributes to the formation of the DCM. Rather than an increase of overall cell numbers, seasonal light limitation or low irradiance levels can raise the individual cellular chlorophyll content. As depth increases within the mixing zone, phytoplankton must rely on having higher pigment counts (chlorophyll) to capture photic energy. Due to the higher concentration of chlorophyll in the phytoplankton present, the DCM does not predict the depth of the biomass maximum in the same region.

In addition, compared to shallower regions of the mixing zone, the DCM has high nutrient concentrations and/or lower respiratory, grazing, and death rates which further promote phytoplankton cell production.

==== Vertical migration ====
Vertical migration, or movement of phytoplankton within the water column, contributes to the establishment of the DCM due to the diversity of resources required by the phytoplankton. Dependent on factors like nutrients and available light, some phytoplankton species will intentionally move to different depths to fulfill their physiological requirements. A mechanism employed by certain phytoplankton, such as certain species of diatoms and cyanobacteria, is to regulate their own buoyancy to move through the water column. Other species such as dinoflagellates use their flagella to swim to their desired depth. This intentional movement of phytoplankton contributes to the formation of the DCM in areas where these species make up a significant proportion of the phytoplankton community. Generally these species are larger in size and are not found in significant abundance in nutrient poor regions, so these physiological aspects of phytoplankton contribute less to DCM formation in oligotrophic waters.

In lakes, the thickness of the DCM shows positive correlations with lake sizes. However, due to the great diversity of lakes, there is no constant factor for light and temperature that can be utilized to predict DCM depths across different lake types.

== Composition ==
The composition of microorganisms present in the DCM varies significantly with geographical location, season, and depth.

The species of phytoplankton present in the DCM varies with depth due to varying accessory pigmentation. Some phytoplankton species have accessory pigments, compounds that have adapted them to gather light energy from certain wavelengths of light, even in areas of low light penetration. To optimize light energy collection, phytoplankton will move to specific depths to access different wavelengths of visible light.

The difference in phytoplankton composition between the epilimnion layer and the DCM are consistent throughout several bodies of water. The DCM tends to harbour more flagellated organisms and cryptophytes, whereas the epilimnion layer tends to have a larger centric diatom abundance.

=== Oceans ===
In the Northwestern Mediterranean, the most abundant phytoplankton present are coccolithophorids, flagellates, and dinoflagellates. The Southeastern Mediterranean has a similar composition, where coccolithophorids and monads (nano- and picoplankton) make up the majority of the phytoplankton community in the DCM.

In the Indian Ocean, the most abundant phytoplankton present in the DCM are cyanobacteria, prochlorophytes, coccolithophorids, dinoflagellates and diatoms.

In the North Sea, dinoflagellates are the main phytoplankton species present in the DCM at and below the pycnocline. In shallower parts of the DCM - above the pycnocline, dinoflagellates are also present, as well as nanoflagellates.

=== Lakes ===
==== Lake Superior ====
The DCM of clear, stratified water is commonly found below the epilimnion. Lake Superior is one of the world's largest freshwater lakes, and in the summer, its DCM ranges from approximately 20 m to 35 m below the surface. Although the epilimnion and DCM are neighbouring layers of water, the species composition of the epilimnion and the DCM differ almost entirely. These differences include the presence of less centric diatoms, more pennate diatoms, cryptophytes, and pyrrophytes at the DCM compared to the epilimnion layer. Additionally, the most significant difference in between these two layers is the abundance of Cyclotella comta, which occurs much less in the DCM.

Much more of the DCM community are flagellated (e.g. cryptophytes and pyrrophytes) compared to those of the epilimnion. As flagellated species are better swimmers, this could explain how they are able to reside at their desired depth, the DCM. Another factor for the development of the DCM is nutrient availability. It has been found that the DCM had a lower ratio of particulate organic carbon (POC) to phosphorus (P) than the epilimnion. Since phosphorus is one of the limiting factors for growth, especially in Lake Superior during stratified times, this phenomenon may indicate that phytoplankton in the DCM is more enriched with phosphorus than in the epilimnion. The higher availability of phosphorus may have allowed more phytoplankton to prefer the DCM even with the lower amount of light compared to the epilimnion. On the other hand, the fact that the DCM has lower light availability could be used to argue that the lower POC:P ratio is due to light limitation rather than increased nutrient (P) concentrations.

==== Lake Tahoe ====
In Lake Tahoe, the DCM is unique, as the depth of the region is much lower than normal, present at around 90–110 metres below the surface. Typically, DCM's are found closely below the thermocline, which is present at around 30–40 metres. Lake Tahoe represents a chlorophyll gradient similar to that of oligotrophic areas, such that the depth of the region is dependent on seasonal fluctuations. Due to these temporal shifts, especially between spring and summer, Lake Tahoe's phytoplankton communities undergo distinct changes. During the spring months, the DCM coincides with the upper surface of the nitracline, making the water nutrient-rich for diatoms Cyclotella striata and chrysophytes Dinobryon bavaricum to thrive in. During the summer months, the DCM deepens, and productivity within the layer almost becomes entirely light dependent. Similar to the chlorophyll structures found in oceans, the DCM becomes incredibly fluid and variable, such that certain phytoplankton species (diatoms Synedra ulna, Cyclotella comta and green flagellates) begin to dominate, despite being absent during the spring productivity period.

Overall, the phytoplankton community between the epilimnion and the DCM in Lake Tahoe differ with size. Both regions are abundant with diatoms; small diatoms (cell volume = 30.5μm³) such as Cyclotella stelligera, Synedra radians make up the majority in the epilimnion, while larger diatoms (cell volume = 416.3μm³) such as C.ocellata, Stephanodiscus alpinus, Fragilaria crotonensis, dominate the DCM.

==== Lakes of the North Patagonian Andean Region ====
Lakes of the North Patagonian Andean Region can be divided into larger deeper lakes and smaller shallow lakes. Although these lakes are found in the same region, they exhibit different conditions leading to varying DCM species compositions. The large deep lakes are ultra-oligotrophic, as they are very transparent and contain low DOC and nutrients. Unlike the homogenous thermal profile of the shallower lakes, deeper lakes undergo strong thermal stratification during the late spring and summer. The two lake types also differ in light attenuation coefficients: it is lower in the transparent deeper lakes, which means more light is able to penetrate though.

As such, the main difference between the two lake types that was found to contribute to the DCM community is the light climate. Shallow lakes were found to contain greater concentrations of dissolved yellow particles than the deeper lakes. As a result, for deeper lakes, maximum absorption wavelengths were mainly at the red end of the spectra, whereas shallow lakes exhibited green and blue absorption wavelengths in addition to red.

At the DCM region of the large deep lakes, the mixotrophic ciliate Ophrydium naumanni were dominant. Their phototrophic abilities come from their endosymbiotic algae Chlorella, which are strong competitors in poor light conditions. In addition, the ciliates can undergo phagotrophy to obtain other necessary elements. In shallower lakes, O. naumanni were found to be absent, likely due to higher levels of competition with phytoplankton and turbulence intensity.

== Ecological implications ==
The DCM plays an important ecological role in harbouring much of the world's primary production, and in nutrient cycling. In oligotrophic waters, like the North Sea and the Mediterranean Sea, the DCM is where over half of the overall primary production occurs due to phytoplankton growth. The high rate of primary production in the DCM facilitates nutrient cycling to higher trophic levels in the mixed layer. The DCM forms at the same depth as the nuricline, so phytoplankton in the DCM can access nutrients coming up from the deep ocean. The phytoplankton in the DCM can then cycle back up the water column providing nutrients for heterotrophs in the mixed layer.

Since the DCM environment plays a fundamental role in primary productivity, it can be associated with many aspects of aquatic predator-prey interactions, energy and biomass flow, and biogeochemical cycles. Significant export of organic material from the water column occurs due to the DCM, as heterotrophs consume phytoplankton in the DCM and the fecal matter of grazers sinks to the deep ocean. The DCM is an important food source for secondary producers as it has a relatively high concentration of primary producers at one region of the water column. This makes it easier and faster for grazers to find and consume phytoplankton which in turn increases the rate of movement of energy through the trophic levels.
