= Convective mixing =

In fluid dynamics, convective mixing is the vertical transport of a fluid and its properties. In many important ocean and atmospheric phenomena, convection is driven by density differences in the fluid, e.g. the sinking of cold, dense water in polar regions of the world's oceans; and the rising of warm, less-dense air during the formation of cumulonimbus clouds and hurricanes.

== See also ==
- Atmospheric convection
- Bénard cells
- Churchill–Bernstein equation
- Double diffusive convection
- Heat transfer
  - Heat conduction
  - Thermal radiation
- Heat pipe
- Laser-heated pedestal growth
- Nusselt number
- Thermomagnetic convection
