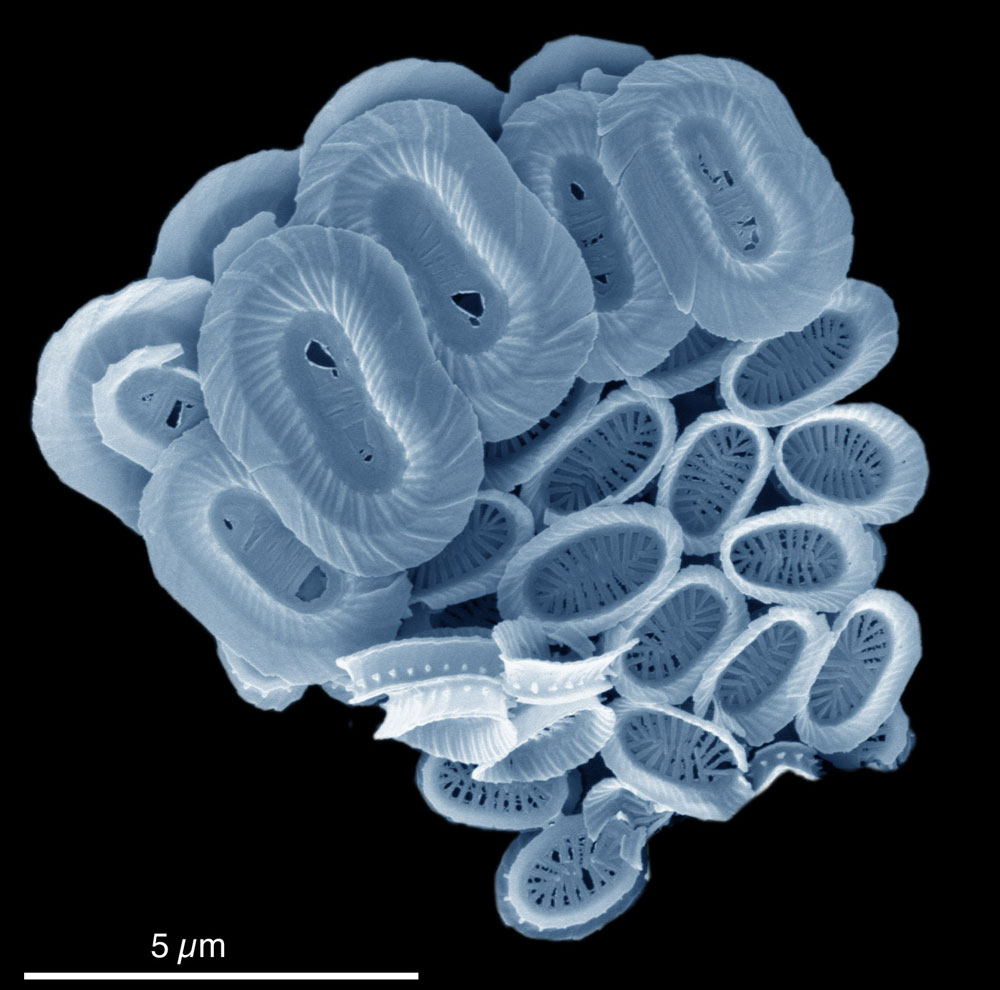

Scientific classification
- Domain: Eukaryota
- Clade: Haptista
- Division: Haptophyta
- Class: Prymnesiophyceae
- Order: Syracosphaerales
- Family: Syracosphaeraceae
- Genus: Syracosphaera
- Species: S. azureaplaneta

Binomial name
- Syracosphaera azureaplaneta Young, Bown, Cros, Hagino & Jordan, 2018

= Syracosphaera azureaplaneta =

Species of single-celled organism

Syracosphaera azureaplaneta is a species of coccolithophore. This oceanic phytoplankton is not common, but is widely distributed and is known to occur in all the major seas, from tropical to sub-arctic regions. It is named after the BBC TV documentary series, The Blue Planet.

== Discovery ==
The species was first described in 2018, following a study of scanning electron micrographs of samples previously assumed to be of Syracosphaera corolla Lecal, 1966. They had mostly been collected by vacuum filtration of sea water from many varied environments, but investigation by researchers revealed two distinct morphological types. As a result, this new species (S. azureaplaneta) was described, and the description of S. corolla was correspondingly emended.

The two species are similar with bowl-shaped body-coccoliths covering the entire cell and a partial outer layer of larger exothecal coccoliths. They primarily differ in their exothecal coccoliths, these have a rough resemblance to a simple inflatable boat, and differ most obviously in the relative widths of the central area of the exothecal coccolith. In S. azureaplaneta this central area is roughly half as wide as it is long, whereas in S. corolla the central area is much narrower, being approximately a quarter of its length.

== Etymology ==
The species name derives from the Latin azurea (blue) and planeta (planet). It was so-named to honour the BBC TV documentary wildlife series, The Blue Planet, as well as in recognition of the programme's presenter, Sir David Attenborough, for his contribution to promoting wider understanding and awareness of the oceanic environment.

== Holotype ==
The holotype (type specimen) of S. azureaplaneta was collected in the South Atlantic from the RRS James Clark Ross research vessel whilst on the 18th Atlantic Meridional Transect research cruise in 2008. The specimens are housed in the Natural History Museum, London.

== See also ==
- List of things named after David Attenborough and his works
