= Ophiaster formosus =

Scientific classification
- Domain: Eukaryota
- Phylum: Haptista
- Subphylum: Haptophytina
- Class: Prymnesiophyceae
- Order: Syracosphaerales
- Family: Syracosphaeraceae
- Genus: Ophiaster
- Species: O. formosus

Binomial name
- Ophiaster formosus Gran, 1912

Species of single-celled organism

Ophiaster formosus is a marine, unicellular species of coccolithophore in the genus Ophiaster, first described by Gran in 1912.
