= Ophiaster hydroideus =

Scientific classification
- Domain: Eukaryota
- Clade: Haptista
- Division: Haptophyta
- Class: Prymnesiophyceae
- Order: Syracosphaerales
- Family: Syracosphaeraceae
- Genus: Ophiaster
- Species: O. hydroideus

Binomial name
- Ophiaster hydroideus (Lohman) Lohmann

Synonyms
- Meringosphaera hydroidea Lohmann

Species of single-celled organism

Ophiaster hydroideus is a marine unicellular species of coccolithophore, an algae, in the family Syracosphaeraceae. It was first described by Hans Lohmann in 1902 as Meringosphaera hydroidea, however, this was changed to Ophiaster hydroideus in 1913. It has modified coccoliths that it can fold in or extend like arms: "These 'arms' are not actively deployed by the cell, but may function as a defensive barrier to discourage predators such as copepods".
