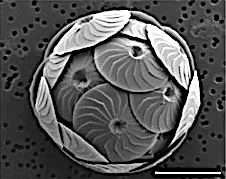
- Calcidiscus leptoporus, scale bar 5 μm

Scientific classification
- Domain: Eukaryota
- Division: Haptophyta
- Class: Prymnesiophyceae
- Order: Coccolithales
- Family: Calcidiscaceae
- Genus: Calcidiscus
- Species: C. leptoporus

Binomial name
- Calcidiscus leptoporus (Murray & Blackman 1898) Loeblich & Tappan, 1978

= Calcidiscus leptoporus =

Calcidiscus leptoporus is a coccolithophore species found extensively globally both in the oceans and in the fossil record, which dates back to the Early Miocene. C. leptoporus, like all coccolithophores, is a unicellular marine phytoplankton within the phylum Haptophyta, which is surrounded by calcium carbonate plates called coccoliths.

There is a lot of morphological variation in C. leptoporus, with well documented, distinct morphotypes. Intraspecies variation is common among coccolithophores, and the variation within C. leptoporus has led them to be frequently used as an example species in research of biodiversity of coccolithophores and marine plankton in general.

As a prominent and calcite-dense species of coccolithophore, C. leptoporus plays a significant role in the cycling of calcium carbonate in the oceans and in sequestering atmospheric CO_{2} into the ocean, though its calcification patterns, distribution, and growth are impacted by environmental factors like temperature, seasonality, and ocean chemistry. There is potential for making inferences of prehistoric environmental changes based on the size and dating of fossilized C. leptoporus coccoliths, though this is a developing field.

== Classification ==
The first recorded observation of C. leptoporus was made in 1898 by George Murray and Vernon H. Blackman in a sample of seawater collected by Murray from the Atlantic Ocean. They called their observation a new species, given its comparably small size and circular coccoliths, and gave it the name Coccosphaera leptoporus.

Coccolithophore classification shifted in the 1950s as new genera were described. Two new species, C. medusoides and C. quadriforatus, were described by Erwin Kamptner in 1950 as members of a new genus, Calcidiscus, though Kamptner later reclassified C. medusoides as a member of the genus Tiarolithus. Later TEM analysis of coccoliths determined that T. medusoides and C. quadriforatus were of the same species as Coccosphaera leptoporus. In 1954, Kamptner also re-classified Coccosphaera leptoporus as a member of the new genus Cyclococcolithus, along with other previously described species Umbilicosphaera mirabilis. However, as U. mirabilis is the type species for genus Umbilicosphaera, this classification was in conflict with the International Code of Botanical Nomenclature (ICBN), and was therefore rejected.

In years following, several other genera of coccolithophore were proposed in lieu of the rejected name. C. foliosus was used as a type species for the newly propposed name Cycloplacolithella in 1968, though it was later determined that the C. foliosus images used for the classification were of the same species as Coccosphaera leptoporus. , making this name invalid. Another genus, Cyclococcolithina, was proposed with a variant of C. leptoporus, C. leptoporus var. inversus, as its type species. However, C. leptoporus var. inversus was promoted to species status within the genus Markalius, and was made the type species for that genus, therefore making Cyclococcolithina invalid.

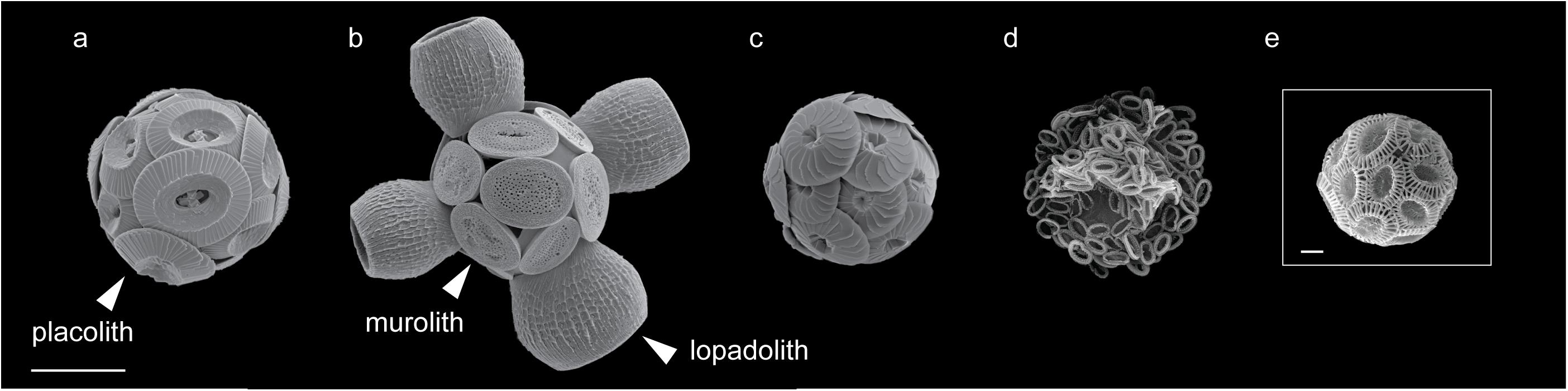
Different coccolithophore species (a-e), C. leptoporus (c)

By the late 1970s, several genera that contained Coccosphaera leptoporus, or coccolithophores later identified as Coccosphaera leptoporus, had been proposed, though they all had problems as listed above. As a solution, these genera were combined. Due to it being the oldest of the generic names, and the only one that was not previously rejected by the ICBN, Calcidiscus was the name given to this genus that now contained C. leptoporus and other members of the previously rejected genera.

== Morphology ==
An important component of all coccolithophores are their coccoliths, which are interlocking calcite (CaCO_{3}) platelets that surround the cell, creating the coccosphere. However, despite being a shared, characteristic structural component, coccoliths have unique, species-specific morphology due to their intricate biosynthesis. Coccospheres range in rigidity, spines, and other shape modifications to suit the species' needs.

Naturally occurring C. leptoporus has coccoliths generally ranging from <5μm to 8μm or greater. Its sutures are angular and serrated, though there is lots of variability in this trait. Unfavourable environmental conditions can lead to coccolith malformation and reduced calcite production for C. leptoporus. Artificial, laboratory conditions have also been shown to negatively impact the morphology of C. leptoporus.

Carbonate coccolith calcite from C. leptoporus contributes greatly to deep-sea carbonate sediments as it causes the sinking of other organic matter, while its precipitation serves as a carbonate counter pump by sequestering atmospheric CO_{2} and increasing aqueous CO_{2}. C. leptoporus has been shown to dominate the production of calcite in the South Atlantic, and therefore plays a crucial biogeochemical role in the Subantarctic Zone (see 'Important Contributor to Carbonate Export' below).

=== Subspecies and morphotypes ===
Calcidiscus leptoporus, like many coccolithophorids, has great intra-species diversity and variability. This variability was noted from its first observation in 1898, which describes variability in both the number structure of coccoliths.

Calcidiscus leptoporus can be divided into morphotypes depending on the size and fine structure of the coccolith. Commonly, three morphotypes are described generally as 'small', 'intermediate', and 'large'. The small morphotype includes those with a coccolith diameter of <5μm and has irregular, angular, and serrated suture lines, which can be used to differentiate from the intermediate morphotype. The intermediate morphotype has a coccolith diameter of 5-8μm and a clear central area, while the large morphotype has a coccolith diameter of >8μm, more numerous and more curved distal shield suture lines, as well as an infilled central area in the coccolith.

There is evidence to suggest that intermediate and large morphotypes of C. leptoporus are distinct enough to be considered separate subspecies, or even different species. In 2002, differences in lifecycles was used as evidence to suggest that the intermediate morphotype be called C. leptoporus leptoporus, and the large morphotype be called C. leptoporus quadriperforatus, as subspecies of C. leptoporus. In 2003, genetic differences in both the conserved 18S rRNA gene and the tufA gene was used to suggest that C. leptoporus quadriperforatus was different enough to be considered its own species, C. quadriperforatus. However, this morphotype is still referred to both as C. leptoporus quadriperforatus and C. quadriperforatus in research since these publications. As of 2022, the International Nannoplankton Association refers to the intermediate and large morphotypes as C. leptoporus leptoporus and C. leptoporus quadriperforatus, respectively. Despite this, there has been discussion as to whether these morphotypes are due to the genetic differences or are phenotypic differences based on environment (see 'Morphotype Distribution and Environmental Preferences' below).

=== Changes in morphology over the life cycle ===
Coccolithophores, including C. leptoporus, undergo calcified haploid or diploid life stages depending on the environment. The diploid stage is usually dominant under normal circumstances. Meanwhile, the haploid stage is dominant when environmental cues are received. During the diploid life stage, a protococcolith ring is first formed within a tightly associated coccolith vesicle (CV). This protococcolith ring consists of repeating sub-vertical and sub-radial calcite crystal units. The ring is then formed into various species-specific morphologies and becomes embedded within the mature coccolith. The diploid stage is characterized by round calcite heterococcoliths, which join at the proximal and distal shields to form the coccosphere. However, during the haploid life stage, holococcoliths are formed intracellularly, which are smaller and composed of different crystal units than heterococcoliths. In addition, a relatively large vacuole space exists between the cell and the holococcosphere, which contrasts the tight association between heterococcoliths and CVs in the diploid stage. Unmineralized body scales are secreted to cover the cell, including smaller "lacey" body scales and larger, more densely structured baseplate scales. However, despite these differences, C. leptoporus utilizes the same Ca^{2+} transport mechanisms for coccolith production, no matter the life stage.

== Life cycle ==
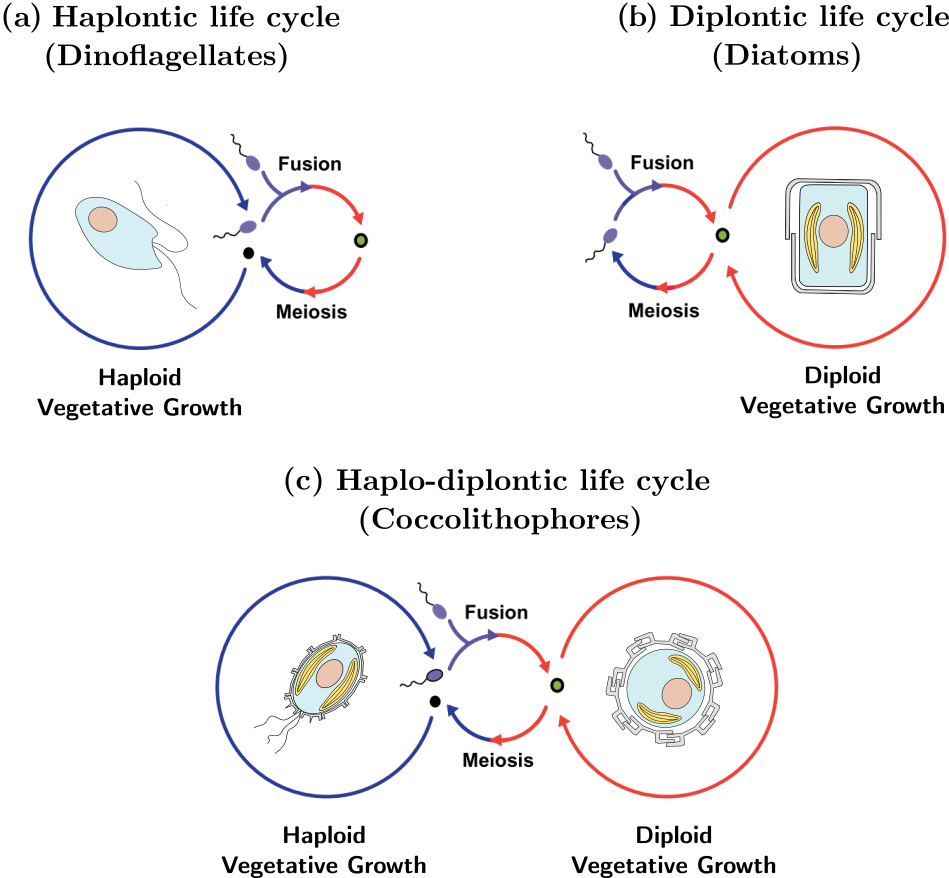
Life cycle strategies of phytoplankton

Calcidiscus leptoporus, along with other coccolithophores, exhibit a halo-diplontic life cycle, each classified based on the coccoliths produced. Life stages alternate between heterococcolith bearing (diploid) and holococcolith bearing (haploid) phases and are intended to facilitate their adaption to environmental variability, expanding their ecological niche.

=== Haplo-diplontic life cycle ===
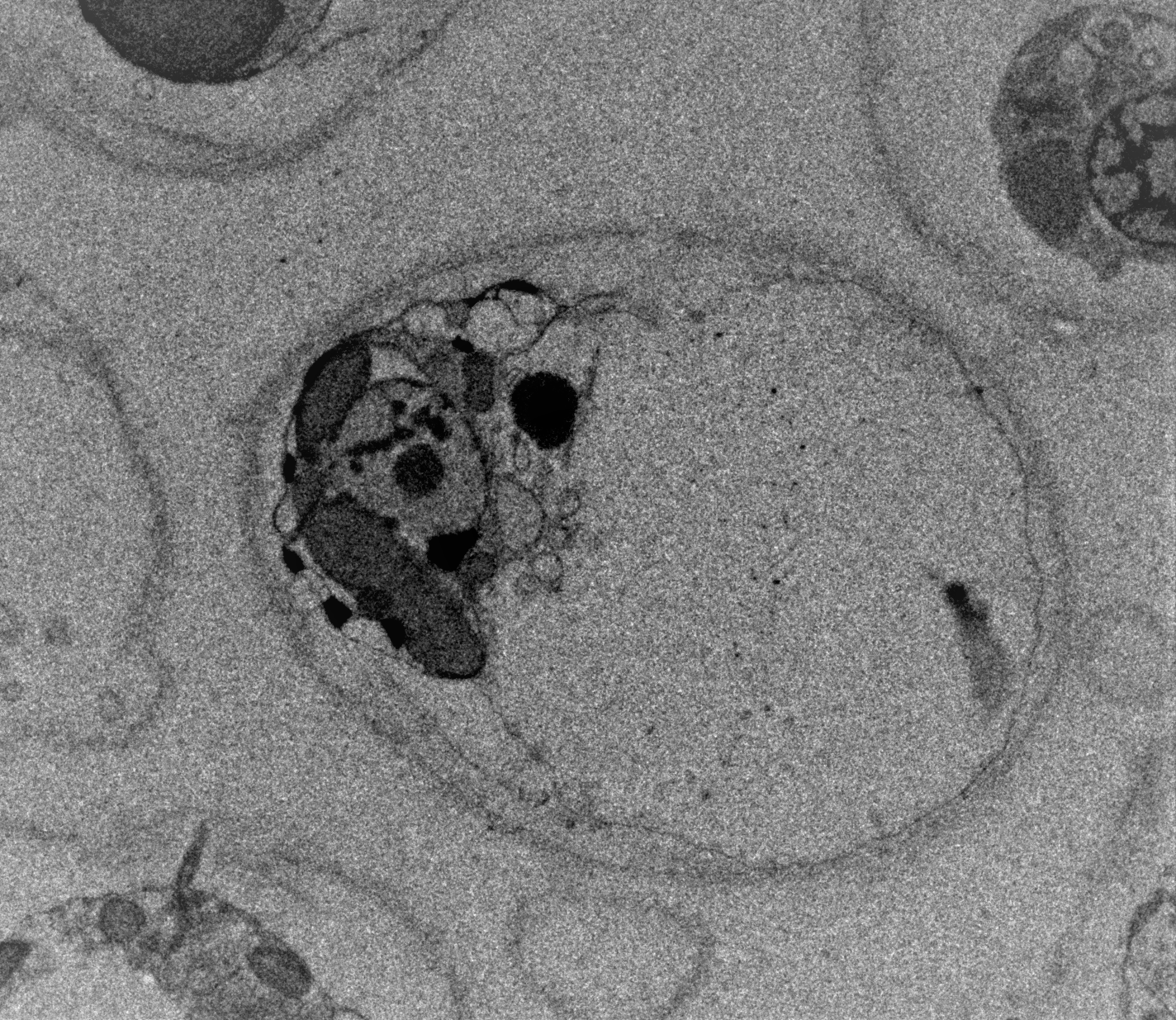
TEM of C. leptoporus in its haploid phase

Defined by the number of chromosomes an organism has during asexual reproduction (mitosis), life cycle is characterized as diplontic, as is the case for diatoms, or haplontic, as is the case for dinoflagellates with few organisms possessing the ability to exhibit both. Haplo-diplontic life cycles are classified by the ability of an organism to divide in both haploid and diploid phases. Organisms exhibiting this life cycle divide by mitosis in both haploid and diploid phases to retain their ploidy levels. Organisms are able to switch from a diploid life phase to a haploid life phase by undergoing meiosis. Alternatively, haploid cells fuse with other haploid cells, presenting as cells in the diploid phase.

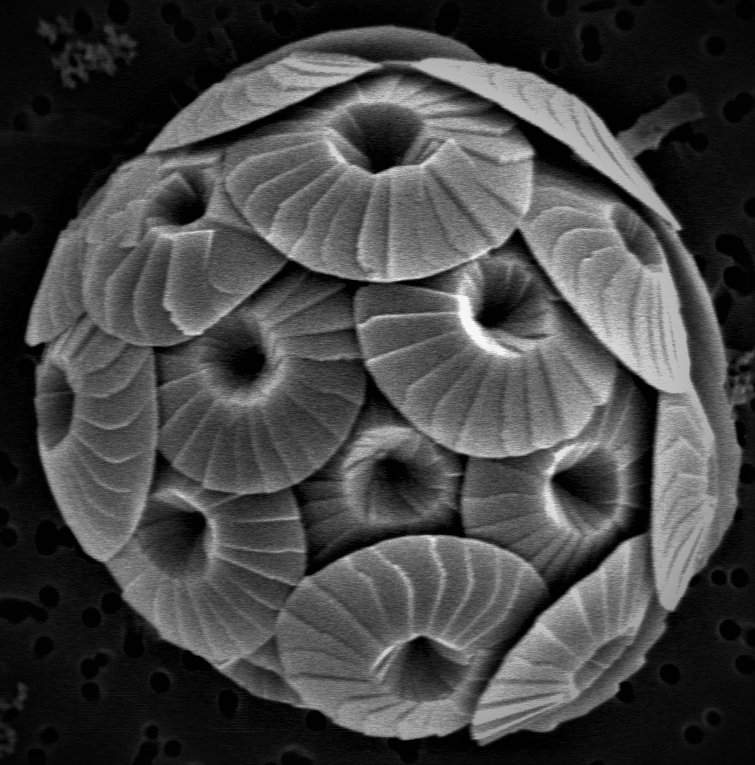
SEM image of C. leptoporus in its diploid phase

=== Haplo-diplontic coccoliths ===
Coccolith structure varies in coccolithophore diploid and haploid life phases. The haploid phase is characterized as lightly calcified in which holococcoliths are composed of simple rhombic crystals. Whereas in the diploid phase, hetercoccoliths are heavily calcified and composed of elaborately shaped crystals.

=== Haplo-diplontic ecological niches ===
Heterococcolithophores and holococcolithophores switch between ploidy levels based on environmental stressors. Stresses mainly include nutrient depletion and light availability. Holococcolithophores are more tolerant to high light, able to survive in both dark and light conditions, whereas hetercoccolithophores are only able to divide in low light conditions. Holococcoliths are also more tolerant of nitrate (NO^{−}_{3}) and phosphate (PO^{3−}_{4}) depleted environments, whereas heterococcolithophores exhibit defects in coccolith formation under these conditions. Differences in tolerances suggest that each life cycle occupies its own ecological niche with heterococcolithophores occupying light depleted and high nutrient environments and holococcolithophores occupying light abundant and low nutrient environments, made possible by a haplo-diplontic life cycle.

== Ecology ==
=== Abundance patterns and seasonal dynamics ===
Calcidiscus leptoporus is found across a wide range of oceanic regions, from tropical to subpolar waters, and exhibits different abundance patterns shaped by seasonal oceanographic conditions.

Cell counts of C. leptoporus performed in 1991 in the Sargasso Sea at Hydrostation S provide an in-depth analysis of abundance patterns. Between January and February, cells were distributed throughout the water column, with the highest concentrations (up to 109 cells/litre) observed at depths of 100 to 150 m. With the onset of thermal stratification in March/April, C. leptoporus populations migrated to deeper layers, reaching peak concentrations near the nutricline while overall abundance declined (maximum of 28 cells/litre at 150 m). During this time, abundance in the upper 100 m remained low (approximately 10 cells/litre). As late spring/summer approached, cell concentrations increased sharply, peaking at over 500 cells/litre in the upper 50 m of the water column before dropping toward the end of summer. The upper 100 m of the water column experienced a second increase in abundance in the fall, but remained lower in concentrations than in the spring and summer periods (maximum of 69 cells/litre). Thus, two seasonal peaks of abundance occur throughout the year: a major peak in the spring/summer (May/July) and a smaller, secondary peak in the fall/winter (November to March).

Time series sediment trap studies showed seasonal variations in the abundance of C. leptoporus at several geographical sites. In the North East Atlantic, C. leptoporus populations peaked during spring at the beginning of summer stratification. Peak abundances occurred in late spring-start of summer in the North West Atlantic, followed by a minor peak in the winter. Seasonal, reversing wind patterns in the Arabian Sea lead to a rise in C. leptoporus abundance during monsoon periods. However, the magnitude of this increase was smaller than that observed in the other sites. While C. leptoporus populations in the North Atlantic reach their maximum abundance during spring and summer, the Arabian Sea experiences its highest concentrations in the fall.

=== Morphotype distribution and environmental preferences ===
The interplay between C. leptoporus morphotypes and environmental parameters is complex and can vary depending on the geographic location. Multiple studies infer that the three C. leptoporus morphotypes have different environmental preferences.

It has been proposed that the intermediate morphotype of C. leptoporus prefers colder temperatures and lower nutrient availability based on relative abundance data from the North Atlantic and Arabian Sea. However, the intermediate morphotype has been found to have an affinity for cooler waters and higher nutrient availability in the South Atlantic. The large morphotype seems to favour productive environments with higher temperatures and nutrient levels. While data on the small morphotype of C. leptoporus is limited, observations suggest a preference for nutrient-enriched waters.

=== Effects of ocean acidification ===
An experimental study showed that coccolith formation in C. leptoporus is impaired under conditions of elevated CO_{2} concentrations and low pH. Further research examined various manipulations of the seawater carbonate system on C. leptoporus coccolith morphology and revealed that increased numbers of malformed coccoliths were driven by the increase in CO_{2} concentration, rather than changes in pH, total alkalinity, dissolved inorganic carbon, bicarbonate, or carbonate ion concentrations. Moreover, pCO_{2} levels over 1500 μatm were found to promote cell aggregation.

== Ecological importance of Calcidiscus leptoporus ==
=== Paleo-proxy for growth rate ===
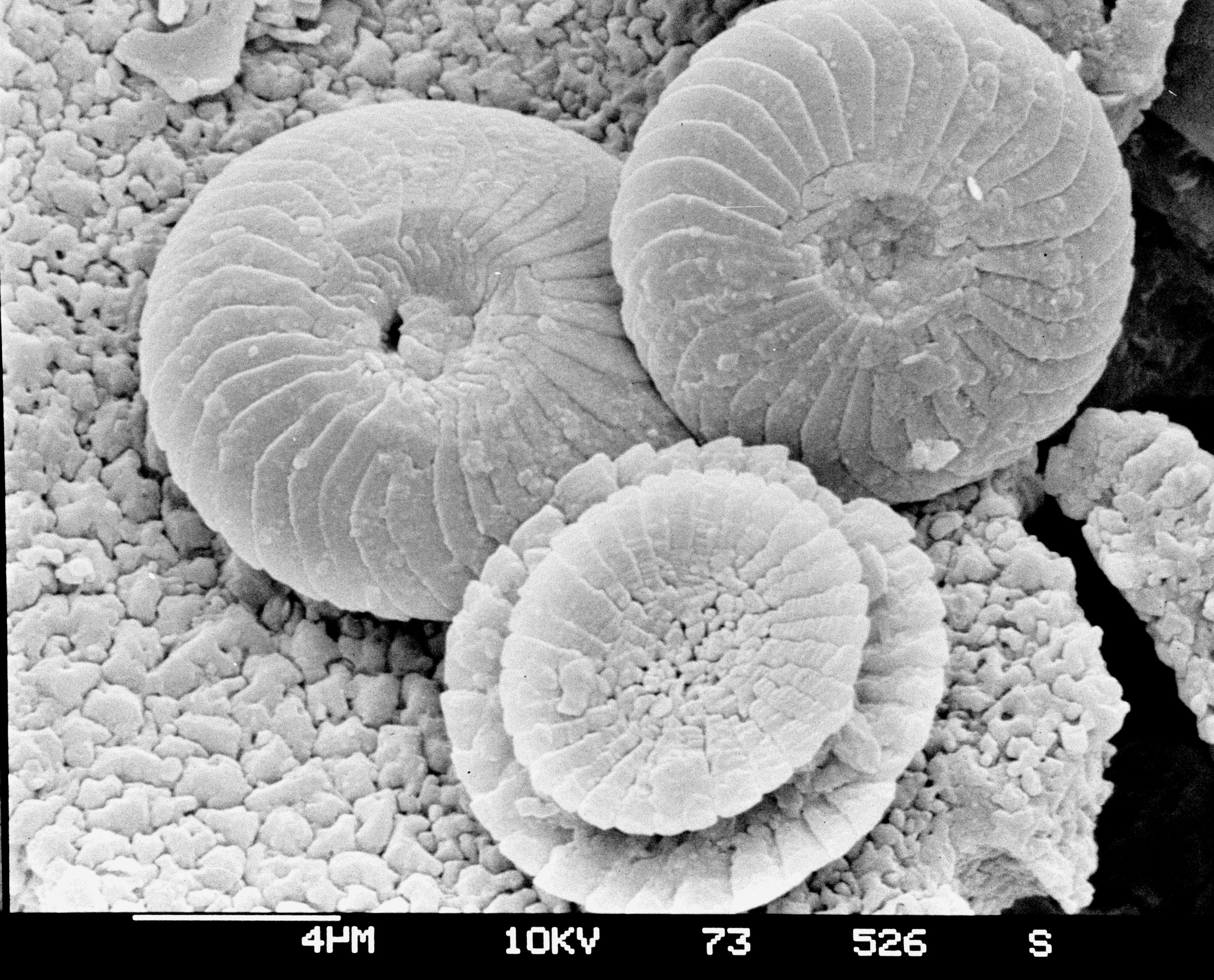
C. leptoporus coccolith fossils

Calcidiscus leptoporus coccolith size (mass and area) exhibits a statistically significant positive correlation with growth rate. Supported consistent patterns by sediment trap studies in the Subantarctic Southern Ocean and North Atlantic Ocean show a consistent, statistically significant positive correlation between coccolith flux and both mass and area, suggesting a biological mechanism instead of a site-specific mechanism. Furthermore, controlled experiments have demonstrated that slower growth rates lead to smaller coccoliths, while faster growth rates yield larger, well-formed ones. However, further studies are required to validate this relationship under varying environmental conditions.

The measure of size of C. leptoporus coccoliths size and calibrating with δ^{13}C and δ^{18}O records has the potential to strengthen, correct, refine interpretations of past ocean productivity and environmental shifts, particularly in regions where C. leptoporus is a significant contributor to carbonate export, for instance Subantarctic Southern Ocean within the Great Calcite Belt. Again, this approach holds promise as a useful tool in paleoceanographic research and reconstruction if the currently positive correlation is validated, although it remains a developing field.

=== Important contributor to carbonate export ===
The Great Calcite Belt (GCB) was identified through satellites, as a circumpolar band between 40° and 60°S covering about 16% of the global oceanic surface. The GCB is subsequently recognized as a primary region of surface carbonate production fueled by coccolithophore blooms.

From research conducted in the southern ocean's subantarctic zone within the GCB, it was established that C. leptoporus is disproportionately significant in ocean calcium carbonate export. Despite C. leptoporus is relative scarce in comparison to smaller coccolithophores such as Emiliania huxleyi, it produces larger and denser calcified coccoliths that facilitate sinking, thereby strengthening its contribution to long-term carbon export. Notably, even in regions where C. leptoporus is less prevalent, it contributes more mass per cell to carbonate sedimentation.

Observations from Sediment trap highlight that C. leptoporus contributes 30–70% annual carbonate export within the Subantarctic Zone. Moreover, the ecological importance of the C. leptoporus is even greater due to the large area of the GCB, further indicating the significant role in global oceanic carbonate cycling.

=== Impact on the biological pump ===
The dense and heavy coccoliths of C. leptoporus facilitate the process of ballast organic material and enhance the efficiency of the biological pump. These coccoliths increase the sinking velocity of both organic and inorganic material. As a result, there is an increased likelihood of carbon being exported to the deep ocean for long-term carbon sequestration, rather than being recycled in surface waters.
