= Acanthoica quattrospina =

Scientific classification
- Domain: Eukaryota
- Clade: Diaphoretickes
- Phylum: Haptista
- Subphylum: Haptophytina
- Class: Prymnesiophyceae
- Order: Syracosphaerales
- Family: Rhabdosphaeraceae
- Genus: Acanthoica
- Species: A. quattrospina

Binomial name
- Acanthoica quattrospina Lohmann, 1903

Species of single-celled organism

Acanthoica quattrospina is a species of alga belonging to the family Rhabdosphaeraceae.

It has cosmopolitan distribution.
