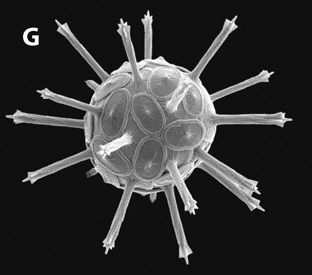
- Electron microscopy image of Rhabdosphaera clavigera

Scientific classification
- Domain: Eukaryota
- Clade: Diaphoretickes
- Phylum: Haptista
- Subphylum: Haptophytina
- Class: Prymnesiophyceae
- Order: Syracosphaerales
- Family: Rhabdosphaeraceae
- Genus: Rhabdosphaera
- Species: R. clavigera

Binomial name
- Rhabdosphaera clavigera Murray and Blackman, 1898

= Rhabdosphaera clavigera =

Species of single-celled organism

Rhabdosphaera clavigera is a marine, unicellular species of coccolithophore in the genus Rhabdosphaera. The species name references the Latin word claviger (one who carries a club) to describe the pentameral (five-point) spines emerging from the calcium carbonate coccosphere. The stylifera variant has shorter, thinner, and symmetrical spines, as compared to the type species.
