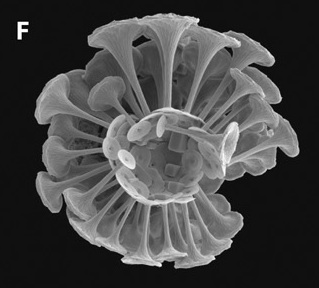

Scientific classification
- Domain: Eukaryota
- Clade: Haptista
- Division: Haptophyta
- Class: Prymnesiophyceae
- Order: Syracosphaerales
- Family: Rhabdosphaeraceae
- Genus: Discosphaera
- Species: D. tubifer

Binomial name
- Discosphaera tubifer (Murray & Blackman) Ostenfeld

= Discosphaera tubifer =

Species of single-celled organism

Discosphaera tubifer (original name: Discosphaera tubifera) is a marine, unicellular species of coccolithophore in the genus Discosphaera. It exhibits a very delicate structure and arrangement of coccoliths.
