= Acanthoica =

Scientific classification
- Domain: Eukaryota
- Clade: Diaphoretickes
- Phylum: Haptista
- Subphylum: Haptophytina
- Class: Prymnesiophyceae
- Order: Syracosphaerales
- Family: Rhabdosphaeraceae
- Genus: Acanthoica; Lohmann

Genus of single-celled organisms

Acanthoica is a genus of algae belonging to the family Rhabdosphaeraceae.

The genus was first described by Lohmann in 1902.

Species:

- Acanthoica ornata Conrad
- Acanthoica quattrospina Lohmann
- Acanthoica rubens Kamptner
