= Syracosphaera =

Scientific classification
- Domain: Eukaryota
- Division: Haptophyta
- Class: Prymnesiophyceae
- Order: Syracosphaerales
- Family: Syracosphaeraceae
- Genus: Syracosphaera; Lohmann, 1902

Synonyms
- Gaarderia A.Kleijne, 1993

Genus of algae

Syracosphaera is a genus of unicellular, marine coccolithophores belonging to the class Prymnesiophyceae in the phylum Haptophyta. Syracosphaera belongs to the family Syracosphaeraceae, which is the most species-rich family within the coccolithophores and contains approximately 25 percent of all current coccolithophore species. Syracosphaera is differentiated from other coccolithophore genera through its doubled layered coccosphere architecture, the production of two distinct coccolith types on a single coccosphere, which is the main diagnostic character of the genus. The body coccoliths cover the main surface of the cell and circum-flagellar coccoliths surround the space where the two flagella emerge.

The genus was established by the German zoologist Hans Lohmann in 1902 and currently contains approximately 36 valid species, where electron-microscopic characterization of coccolith morphology allows for classification.^{[4][5]} Species of Syracosphaera are found mainly in warm, oligotrophic marine waters, namely in the Mediterranean Sea and the subtropical Atlantic and Pacific Oceans and contribute to the marine carbonate system and the biological carbon pump through their calcification and photosynthesis.

Syracosphaera demonstrates a heteromorphic alternation of generations between its diploid phase producing heterococcoliths and its haploid phase which produces holococcoliths. The two phases fall within different ecological niches, with the haploid (holococcolith) phase tending to be more predominant in oligotrophic, light-available surface waters and the diploid (heterococcolith) phase better suited to deeper, more nutrient rich conditions.

== Etymology ==
Etymology was not provided in the original description made of the genus.^{[11]} However, the name is likely a combination of the Latin Syraco-, stemming from the word Syracuse after the type locality of the genus ^{[4]}, and the Greek sphaira meaning sphere.

== Type Species ==
Syracosphaera pulchra Lohmann, 1902

== History of Knowledge ==
The genus Syracosphaera was established by the German zoologist Hans Lohmann (1863–1934) in the 1902 monograph Die Coccolithophoridae: eine Monographie der Coccolithen bildenden Flagellaten, published in Archiv für Protistenkunde. Based on net-collected plankton samples from the Mediterranean Sea, Lohmann described different coccolithophore taxa for the first time using light microscopy, classifying Syracosphaera pulchra as the type species.^{[11]}

During the mid-twentieth century the genus was expanded to further include additional species, but the limitations of light microscopy caused confusion regarding the taxonomic classification and resulted in inconsistent species classifications. The development of transmission electron microscopy (TEM) and scanning electron microscopy (SEM) in the 1960s and 1970s enabled detailed characterization of coccolith ultrastructure and the differentiation of features not visible under light microscopy.

Cros and Fortuño (2002) produced an atlas of coccolithophores from the northwestern Mediterranean Sea using SEM and TEM, which included descriptions of many Syracosphaera species. This work made the distinction between body coccoliths and circum-flagellar coccoliths as important taxonomic features and fixed species boundaries based on detailed SEM examination of coccosphere architecture. This atlas, the Atlas of Northwestern Mediterranean coccolithophores, serves as an important morphological reference for the genus.

Young et al. (2003) published A Guide to Extant Coccolithophore Taxonomy in the Journal of Nannoplankton Research. This work combined previously existing morphological and molecular data across all coccolithophore genera and established a revised taxonomy placing Syracosphaera within the family Syracosphaeraceae and the order Syracosphaerales.

Holococcolith cells of Syracosphaera were historically assigned to separate genera before the life cycle connection was established. The most well-known example is Syracosphaera pulchra, whose HOL-phase cells were formerly placed in two entirely separate genera: Calyptrosphaera oblonga Lohmann, 1902 and Daktylethra pirus (Kamptner) Norris, 1985. Life-cycle associations were established through multiple observations of combination coccospheres in plankton samples and confirmed by culture experiments in which a single strain was observed alternating between the S. pulchra (HET) and C. oblonga (HOL) morphologies.^{[9][10]} On this basis, Geisen et al. (2002) formally made the species C. oblonga and D. pirus synonymous with S. pulchra and their HOL phases are now referred to as S. pulchra HOL oblonga-type and S. pulchra HOL pirus-type respectively, included within Syracosphaera taxonomy.^{[9]}

Bown, Young & Lees (2017) examined Cretaceous nannofossil collections from the Tanzania Drilling Project and reported high diversity in coccoliths smaller than 3μm from the Turonian age whose morphology closely resembles Syracosphaera coccoliths. Their work confirmed a Cretaceous record for the Syracosphaerales and established that the poor fossil representation of the order is a product of taphonomic filtering rather than a recent evolutionary origin. This conclusion was consistent with molecular estimates placing the divergence of the order in the Early Jurassic.^{[6]}

The Nannotax3 database (International Nannoplankton Association) currently serves as the online repository for up-to-date taxonomic and morphological data on Syracosphaera species, including SEM images and stratigraphic ranges.^{[7]}

== Habitat and Ecology ==
Species of Syracosphaera are exclusively marine and planktonic, occurring as free-floating cells in the oceanic water column. They are primarily recorded from warm oligotrophic waters of the subtropical and tropical ocean, including the Mediterranean Sea, the subtropical Atlantic, and the Pacific, but some species extend into temperate and occasionally polar regions. As such, this genus can be seen to be particularly widespread, covering a large range of regions in many different areas around the globe.

Analysis of global coccolithophore survey data from the CASCADE dataset (which includes observations from a variety of different oceanic regions) shows that Syracosphaera molischii and Syracosphaera pulchra are among the most frequently recorded and abundant species in the genus, demonstrating ecological adaptability to diverse temperature regimes and nutrient conditions. Temperature preferences within the genus are diverse, with some species having a narrow thermal optimum, such as S. pulchra and S. mediterranea which are primarily found in warmer subtropical waters, while others span broad temperature ranges, like S. corolla and S. marginiporata. Nutrient availability plays an important role in structuring. The haploid (HOL) phases of most Syracosphaera species consistently tending to prefer oligotrophic conditions reflected by negative correlations with nitrate, phosphate, and chlorophyll a. In contrast, the diploid (HET) phases exhibit a wider range of more variable responses, with species such as S. halldalii and S. ossa thriving in nutrient-richer conditions during bloom events.

All Syracosphaera species occupy the photic zone where photosynthetically active radiation is sufficient to sustain photosynthesis, however heterococcolith forms are commonly found in cooler, lower light areas in the lower photic zones, whereas holococcolith forms are primarily found in the light abundant upper photic zones.

A key ecological role of Syracosphaera and other coccolithophores is their contribution to the marine carbonate system and the biological carbon pump. Calcification converts dissolved bicarbonate and calcium ions into calcite coccoliths. Upon cell death, coccoliths and organic cellular contents sink, transporting carbon toward the seafloor in a flow of calcium carbonate that contributes to calcareous sediments.

== Description of the Organism ==
=== Morphology and Ultrastructure ===
Cells of Syracosphaera are normally spherical to ovoid, ranging in diameter from approximately 5 to 25 μm depending on species. The entire cell is enclosed by the coccosphere, a covering of interlocking calcite coccoliths. The coccosphere of Syracosphaera is typically dithecate, consisting of an inner layer (endotheca) of body coccoliths and circum-flagellar coccoliths, and in many species an outer layer (exotheca) of morphologically distinct exothecal coccoliths. The defining diagnostic feature of the genus is this dimorphic coccosphere, comprising two morphologically distinct coccolith types:

Body coccoliths: These cover the majority of the cell surface (i.e. the body of the cell) and are classified as muroliths, wall-forming structures composed of a flat or slightly raised central area and a marginal ring of calcite elements.

Circum-flagellar coccoliths (CFC): These are morphologically distinct from the body coccoliths, the CFC surround the flagellar aperture at the anterior area of the cell. They are typically more structurally complex than the body coccoliths and are very useful as diagnostic tools at the species level. The morphological differentiation of body coccoliths from CFC is the primary character helping to unite the genus.

Coccoliths are produced intracellularly within coccolith vesicles (CV), specialized organelles associated with the Golgi apparatus, and exocytosed to the cell surface upon completion. The two flagella and a haptonema in the middle, which functions in the process of prey capture and substrate adhesion, comes out through the flagellar aperture. Two peripheral, golden/brown chloroplasts contain chlorophylls a and c and the pigment 19’-hexanoyloxyfucoxanthin, a light harvesting pigment.^{[8]}

=== Life Cycle ===
Syracosphaera exhibits a heteromorphic diplohaplontic life cycle, alternating between a diploid (2n) heterococcolith-bearing (HET) phase and a haploid (n) holococcolith-bearing (HOL) phase.

The two life stages occupy different ecological niches: the HOL phase dominates in oligotrophic, well-lit surface waters. Here, HOL cells have an advantage as they produce holococcoliths that are smaller, reducing metabolic demand and calcification while increasing nutrient uptake efficiency. This lower calcification also allows for maintaining of buoyancy, keeping them in well-lit waters where photosynthesis can be maximized. The HET phase is more morphologically complex and is better adapted to deeper or more nutrient rich conditions, where they are more resilient to stressors such as low light and varying nutrients. Seasonally, species such as S. molischii and S. pulchra show shifts in HOL/HET phase abundance associated with changes in water column stratification, light availability, and nutrient dynamics.

== Fossil History ==
The fossil record of Syracosphaera and the Syracosphaerales was considered extremely poor or absent for a long time, despite molecular clock analyses placing the divergence of the order as early as the Jurassic. Bown, Young & Lees (2017) investigated this discrepancy by examining nannofossil collection on Cretaceous Tanzania Drilling Project sediment surfaces under SEM. In Turonian sediments, they discovered a diversity of small coccoliths, typically under 3 μm, some of which are comparable to modern Syracosphaera coccoliths. These collections provided the first Cretaceous record of the Syracosphaeraceae. Due to their fragility, the dimorphic coccosphere that defines Syracosphaera is rarely kept in one piece, making genus-level identification difficult.

== List of Species ==
• Syracosphaera ampliora Okada & McIntyre 1977

• Syracosphaera anthos (Lohmann) Janin, 1987

• Syracosphaera azureaplaneta Young, Geisen & Probert, 2014

• Syracosphaera bannockii (Borsetti & Cati) Theodoridis, 1984

• Syracosphaera borealis Okada & McIntyre, 1977

• Syracosphaera communis Okada & McIntyre, 1977

• Syracosphaera corolla Lecal, 1966

• Syracosphaera cristata Lecal, 1966

• Syracosphaera delicata Cros et al. 2000

• Syracosphaera dilatata R.W. Jordan, Kleijne & Heimdal, 1993

• Syracosphaera elatensis Winter, 1979 (synonym of S. molischii)

• Syracosphaera epigrosa Okada & McIntyre 1977

• Syracosphaera exigua Okada & McIntyre, 1977

• Syracosphaera florida Sánchez-Suárez 1990

• Syracosphaera halldalii Gaarder ex R.W. Jordan & J.C. Green, 1994

• Syracosphaera histrica Kamptner, 1941

• Syracosphaera lamina Lecal-Schlauder, 1951

• Syracosphaera marginiporata Knappertsbusch, 1993

• Syracosphaera mediterranea Lohmann, 1902

• Syracosphaera molischii Schiller, 1925

• Syracosphaera nana (Kamptner) Okada & McIntyre, 1977

• Syracosphaera nodosa Kamptner, 1941

• Syracosphaera noroitica Knappertsbusch 1993

• Syracosphaera orbiculus (Okada & McIntyre) Jordan & Chamberlain, 1997

• Syracosphaera ossa (Lecal) Loeblich & Tappan, 1966

• Syracosphaera pirus Halldal & Markali 1955

• Syracosphaera prolongata Gran ex Lohmann, 1912

• Syracosphaera protrudens Okada & McIntyre 1977

• Syracosphaera pulchra Lohmann, 1902 (type species)

• Syracosphaera rotula Okada & McIntyre, 1977

• Syracosphaera schilleri (Lemmermann) Deflandre & Fert, 1954

• Syracosphaera subsalsa (Ostenfeld) Schiller, 1913

• Syracosphaera tumularis Kamptner, 1941
