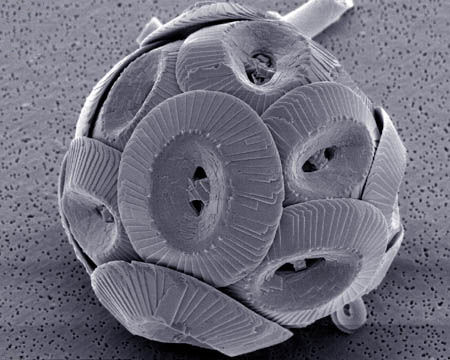
- Coccolithus pelagicus

Scientific classification
- Domain: Eukaryota
- Supergroup: Haptista
- Division: Haptophyta
- Class: Prymnesiophyceae

Groups included
- Isochrysidales; Coccolithales

= Coccolithophore =

Coccolithophore Paraphyletic grouping of algae Temporal range: Rhaetian–Recent

Unicellular algae responsible for the formation of chalk

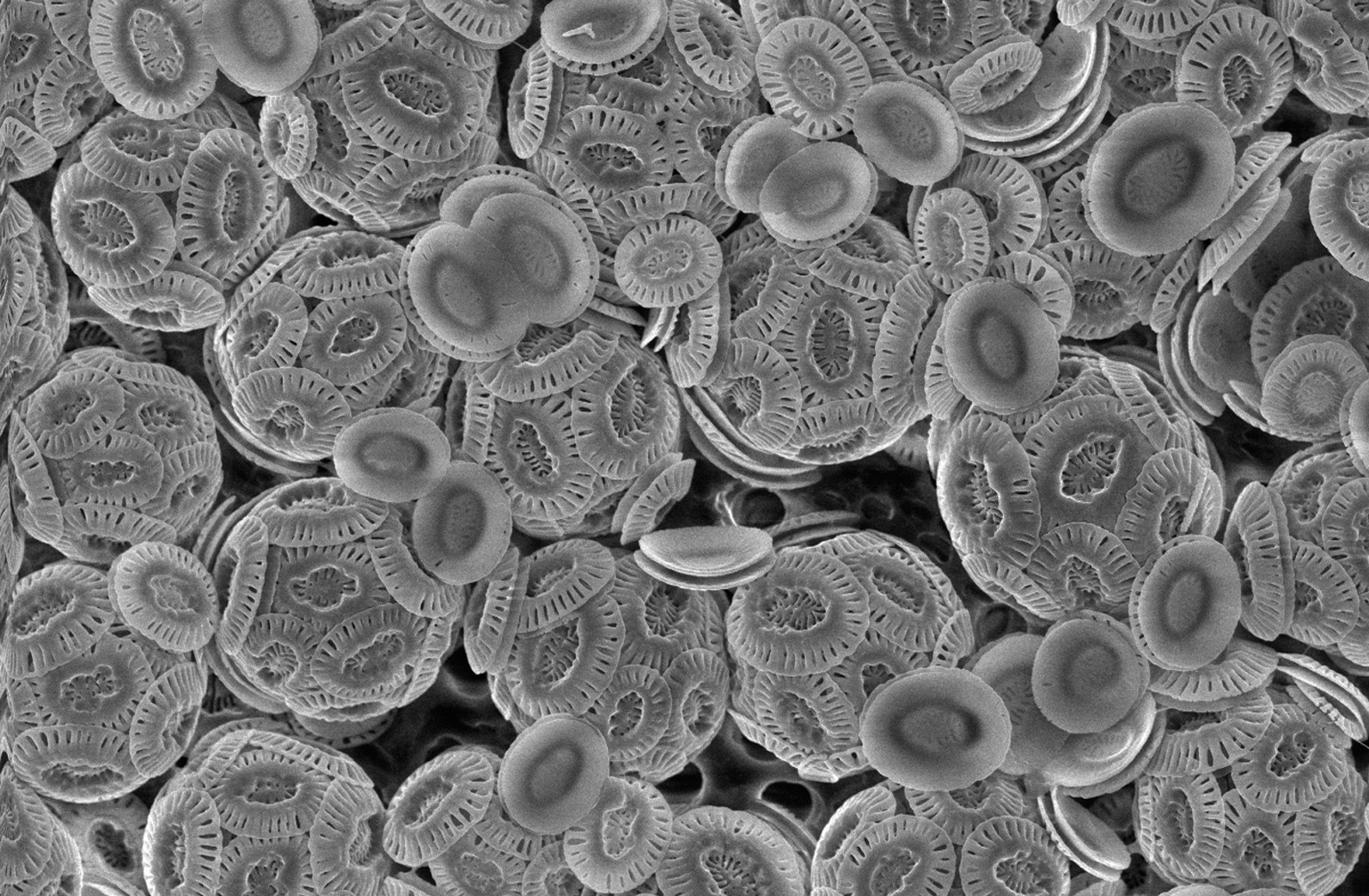
Coccolithophore cells are covered with protective calcified (chalk) scales called coccoliths

Coccolithophores, or coccolithophorids, are single-celled organisms which are part of the phytoplankton, the autotrophic (self-feeding) component of the plankton community. They form a group of a few hundred species, and belong either to the kingdom Protista, according to Robert Whittaker's five-kingdom system, or clade Hacrobia, according to a newer biological classification system. Within the Hacrobia, the coccolithophores are in the phylum or division Haptophyta, class Prymnesiophyceae (or Coccolithophyceae). Coccolithophores are almost exclusively marine, are photosynthetic and mixotrophic, and exist in large numbers throughout the sunlight zone of the ocean.

Coccolithophores are the most productive calcifying organisms on the planet, covering themselves with a calcium carbonate shell called a coccosphere. It is formed when a cell arranges a series of interlocking coccoliths to completely cover its surface. Coccoliths (minute calcium carbonate platelets) are generated within the cell, suggesting that the cell diameter cannot be exceeded by the maximum coccolith size. In addition, coccolith size and the orientation of calcite crystals forming coccoliths can vary among species. Although the interlocking structure of coccoliths offers strong mechanical protection for cell, the specific topology of the coccoliths (the way they interconnect within the coccosphere) and the mechanisms governing their arrangement remain unclear. One key function may be that the coccosphere offers protection against microzooplankton predation, which is one of the main causes of phytoplankton death in the ocean.

Coccolithophores are ecologically important, and biogeochemically they play significant roles in the marine biological pump and the carbon cycle. Depending on habitat, they can produce up to 40 percent of the local marine primary production. They are of particular interest to those studying global climate change because, as ocean acidity increases, their coccoliths may become even more important as a carbon sink. Management strategies are being employed to prevent eutrophication-related coccolithophore blooms, as these blooms lead to a decrease in nutrient flow to lower levels of the ocean.

The most abundant species of coccolithophore, Emiliania huxleyi, belongs to the order Isochrysidales and family Noelaerhabdaceae. It is found in temperate, subtropical, and tropical oceans. This makes E. huxleyi an important part of the planktonic base of a large proportion of marine food webs. It is also the fastest growing coccolithophore in laboratory cultures. It is studied for the extensive blooms it forms in nutrient depleted waters after the reformation of the summer thermocline. and for its production of molecules known as alkenones that are commonly used by earth scientists as a means to estimate past sea surface temperatures.

== Overview ==
Coccolithophores (or coccolithophorids, from the adjective) form a group of about 200 phytoplankton species. They belong either to the kingdom Protista, according to Robert Whittaker's Five kingdom classification, or clade Hacrobia, according to the newer biological classification system. Within the Hacrobia, the coccolithophores are in the phylum or division Haptophyta, class Prymnesiophyceae (or Coccolithophyceae). Coccolithophores are distinguished by special calcium carbonate plates (or scales) of uncertain function called coccoliths, which are also important microfossils. However, there are Prymnesiophyceae species lacking coccoliths (e.g. in genus Prymnesium), so not every member of Prymnesiophyceae is a coccolithophore.

Coccolithophores are single-celled phytoplankton that produce small calcium carbonate (CaCO_{3}) scales (coccoliths) which cover the cell surface in the form of a spherical coating, called a coccosphere. Many species are also mixotrophs, and are able to photosynthesise as well as ingest prey.

Coccolithophores have been an integral part of marine plankton communities since the Jurassic. Today, coccolithophores contribute ~1–10% to inorganic carbon fixation (calcification) to total carbon fixation (calcification plus photosynthesis) in the surface ocean and ~50% to pelagic CaCO_{3} sediments. Their calcareous shell increases the sinking velocity of photosynthetically fixed CO_{2} into the deep ocean by ballasting organic matter. At the same time, the biogenic precipitation of calcium carbonate during coccolith formation reduces the total alkalinity of seawater and releases CO_{2}. Thus, coccolithophores play an important role in the marine carbon cycle by influencing the efficiency of the biological carbon pump and the oceanic uptake of atmospheric CO_{2}.

As of 2021, it is not known why coccolithophores calcify and how their ability to produce coccoliths is associated with their ecological success. The most plausible benefit of having a coccosphere seems to be a protection against predators or viruses. Viral infection is an important cause of phytoplankton death in the oceans, and it has recently been shown that calcification can influence the interaction between a coccolithophore and its virus. The major predators of marine phytoplankton are microzooplankton like ciliates and dinoflagellates. These are estimated to consume about two-thirds of the primary production in the ocean and microzooplankton can exert a strong grazing pressure on coccolithophore populations. Although calcification does not prevent predation, it has been argued that the coccosphere reduces the grazing efficiency by making it more difficult for the predator to utilise the organic content of coccolithophores. Heterotrophic protists are able to selectively choose prey on the basis of its size or shape and through chemical signals and may thus favor other prey that is available and not protected by coccoliths.

== Structure ==
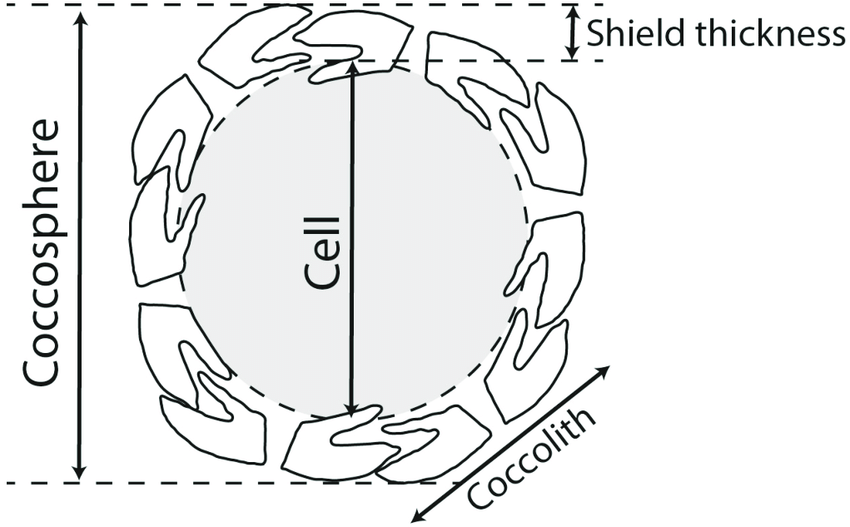
Coccolithophore cell surrounded by its shield of coccoliths. The coccolith-bearing cell is called the coccosphere.

Coccolithophores are spherical cells about 5–100 micrometres across, enclosed by calcareous plates called coccoliths, which are about 2–25 micrometres across. Each cell contains two brown chloroplasts which surround the nucleus.

Enclosed in each coccosphere is a single cell with membrane bound organelles. Two large chloroplasts with brown pigment are located on either side of the cell and surround the nucleus, mitochondria, golgi apparatus, endoplasmic reticulum, and other organelles. Each cell also has two flagellar structures, which are involved not only in motility, but also in mitosis and formation of the cytoskeleton. In some species, a functional or vestigial haptonema is also present. This structure, which is unique to haptophytes, coils and uncoils in response to environmental stimuli. Although poorly understood, it has been proposed to be involved in prey capture.

== Ecology ==
=== Life history strategy ===
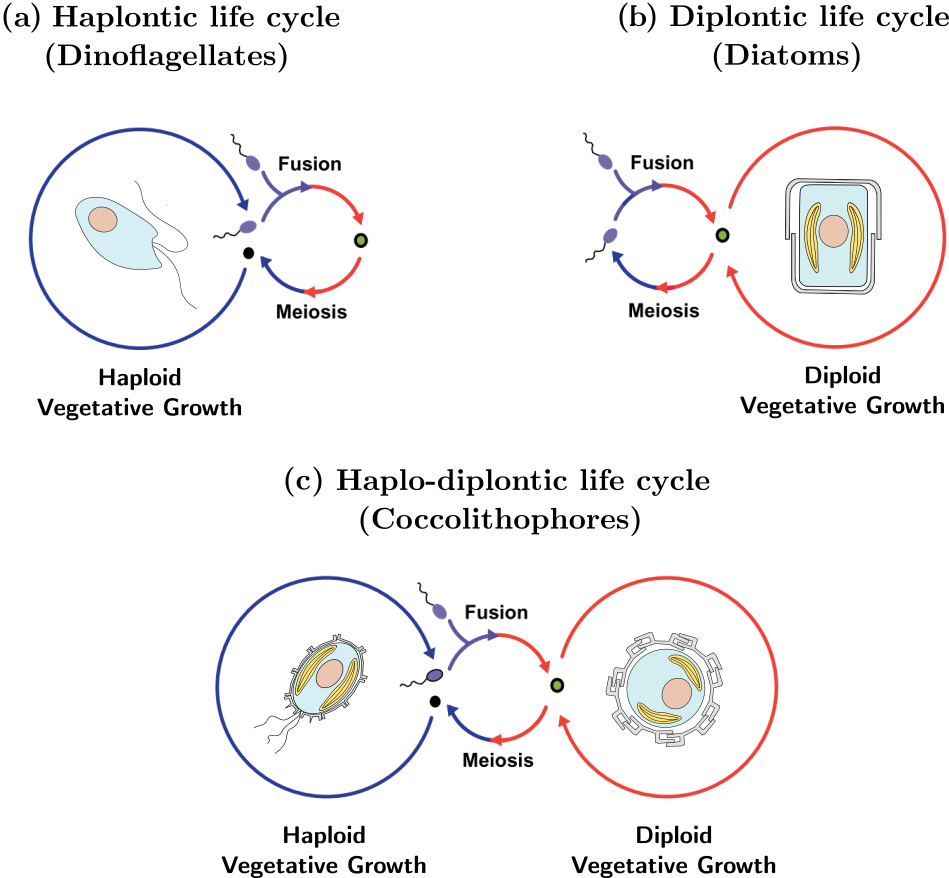
Life cycle strategies of phytoplankton (a) dinoflagellates tend to utilize a haplontic (asexual) life cycle, (b) diatoms tend to utilize a diplontic (sexual) life cycle, and (c) coccolithophores tend to utilize a haplo-diplontic life cycle. Note that not all coccolithophores calcify in their haploid phase.

The complex life cycle of coccolithophores is known as a haplodiplontic life cycle, and is characterized by an alternation of both asexual and sexual phases. The asexual phase is known as the haploid phase, while the sexual phase is known as the diploid phase. During the haploid phase, coccolithophores produce haploid cells through mitosis. These haploid cells can then divide further through mitosis or undergo sexual reproduction with other haploid cells. The resulting diploid cell goes through meiosis to produce haploid cells again, starting the cycle over. With coccolithophores, asexual reproduction by mitosis is possible in both phases of the life cycle, which is a contrast with most other organisms that have alternating life cycles. Both abiotic and biotic factors may affect the frequency with which each phase occurs.

Coccolithophores reproduce asexually through binary fission. In this process the coccoliths from the parent cell are divided between the two daughter cells. There have been suggestions stating the possible presence of a sexual reproduction process due to the diploid stages of the coccolithophores, but this process has never been observed.

K or r- selected strategies of coccolithophores depend on their life cycle stage. When coccolithophores are diploid, they are r-selected. In this phase they tolerate a wider range of nutrient compositions. When they are haploid they are K- selected and are often more competitive in stable low nutrient environments. Most coccolithophores are K strategist and are usually found on nutrient-poor surface waters. They are poor competitors when compared to other phytoplankton and thrive in habitats where other phytoplankton would not survive. These two stages in the life cycle of coccolithophores occur seasonally, where more nutrition is available in warmer seasons and less is available in cooler seasons. This type of life cycle is known as a complex heteromorphic life cycle.

=== Global distribution ===
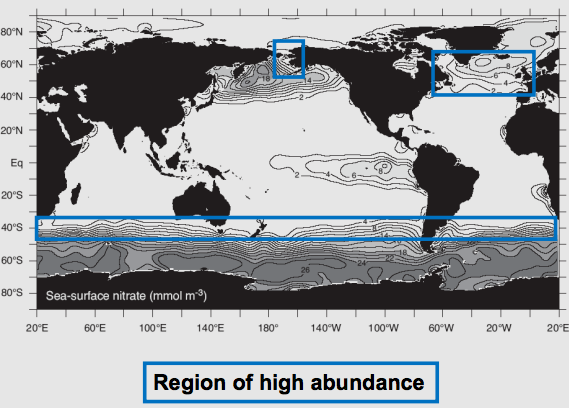
Global distribution of coccolithophores in the ocean

Coccolithophores occur throughout the world's oceans. Their distribution varies vertically by stratified layers in the ocean and geographically by different temporal zones. While most modern coccolithophores can be located in their associated stratified oligotrophic conditions, the most abundant areas of coccolithophores where there is the highest species diversity are located in subtropical zones with a temperate climate. While water temperature and the amount of light intensity entering the water's surface are the more influential factors in determining where species are located, the ocean currents also can determine the location where certain species of coccolithophores are found.

Although motility and colony formation vary according to the life cycle of different coccolithophore species, there is often alternation between a motile, haploid phase, and a non-motile diploid phase. In both phases, the organism's dispersal is largely due to ocean currents and circulation patterns.

Within the Pacific Ocean, approximately 90 species have been identified with six separate zones relating to different Pacific currents that contain unique groupings of different species of coccolithophores. The highest diversity of coccolithophores in the Pacific Ocean was in an area of the ocean considered the Central North Zone which is an area between 30 ^{o}N and 5 ^{o}N, composed of the North Equatorial Current and the Equatorial Countercurrent. These two currents move in opposite directions, east and west, allowing for a strong mixing of waters and allowing a large variety of species to populate the area.

In the Atlantic Ocean, the most abundant species are E. huxleyi and Florisphaera profunda with smaller concentrations of the species Umbellosphaera irregularis, Umbellosphaera tenuis and different species of Gephyrocapsa. Deep-dwelling coccolithophore species abundance is greatly affected by nutricline and thermocline depths. These coccolithophores increase in abundance when the nutricline and thermocline are deep and decrease when they are shallow.

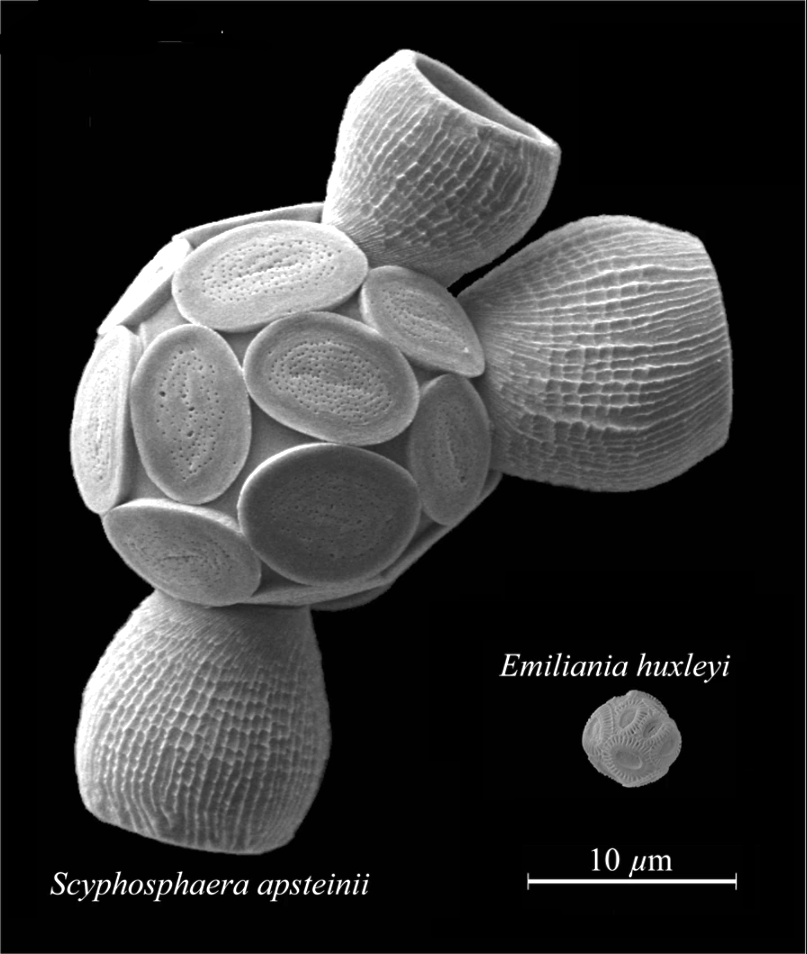
Size comparison between the relatively large coccolithophore Scyphosphaera apsteinii and the relatively small but ubiquitous coccolithophore Emiliania huxleyi

The complete distribution of coccolithophores is currently not known and some regions, such as the Indian Ocean, are not as well studied as other locations in the Pacific and Atlantic Oceans. It is also very hard to explain distributions due to multiple constantly changing factors involving the ocean's properties, such as coastal and equatorial upwelling, frontal systems, benthic environments, unique oceanic topography, and pockets of isolated high or low water temperatures.

The upper photic zone is low in nutrient concentration, high in light intensity and penetration, and usually higher in temperature. The lower photic zone is high in nutrient concentration, low in light intensity and penetration and relatively cool. The middle photic zone is an area that contains the same values in between that of the lower and upper photic zones.

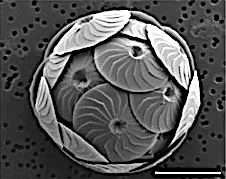
Calcidiscus leptoporus

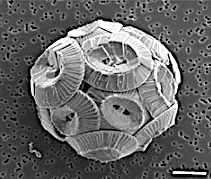
Coccolithus braarudii

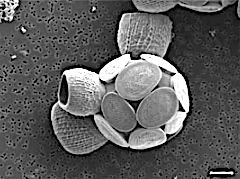
Scyphosphaera apsteinii

Larger coccolithophores such as the species above are less numerous than the smaller but ubiquitous Emiliania huxleyi, but they are heavily calcified and make important contributions to global calcification. Unmarked scale bars 5 μm.

==== Great Calcite Belt ====
Yearly cycle of the Great Calcite Belt in the Southern Ocean

The Great Calcite Belt of the Southern Ocean is a region of elevated summertime upper ocean calcite concentration derived from coccolithophores, despite the region being known for its diatom predominance. The overlap of two major phytoplankton groups, coccolithophores and diatoms, in the dynamic frontal systems characteristic of this region provides an ideal setting to study environmental influences on the distribution of different species within these taxonomic groups.

The Great Calcite Belt, defined as an elevated particulate inorganic carbon (PIC) feature occurring alongside seasonally elevated chlorophyll a in austral spring and summer in the Southern Ocean, plays an important role in climate fluctuations, accounting for over 60% of the Southern Ocean area (30–60° S). The region between 30° and 50° S has the highest uptake of anthropogenic carbon dioxide (CO_{2}) alongside the North Atlantic and North Pacific oceans.

==== Effect of global climate change on distribution ====
Recent studies show that climate change has direct and indirect impacts on Coccolithophore distribution and productivity. They will inevitably be affected by the increasing temperatures and thermal stratification of the top layer of the ocean, since these are prime controls on their ecology, although it is not clear whether global warming would result in net increase or decrease of coccolithophores. As they are calcifying organisms, it has been suggested that ocean acidification due to increasing carbon dioxide could severely affect coccolithophores. Recent CO_{2} increases have seen a sharp increase in the population of coccolithophores.

=== Role in the food web ===
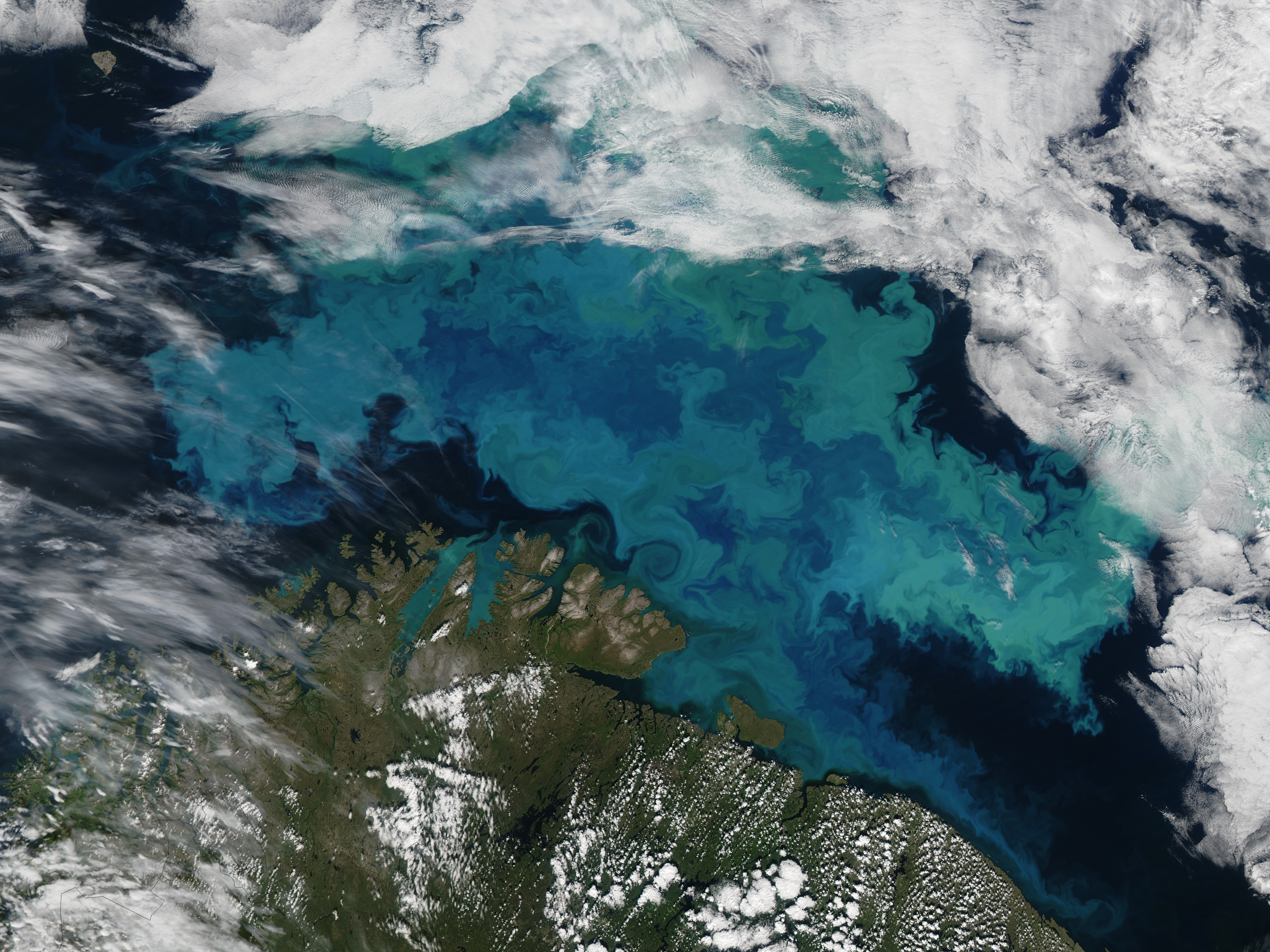
Satellite photograph: The milky blue colour of this phytoplankton bloom in Barents Sea strongly suggests it contains coccolithophores

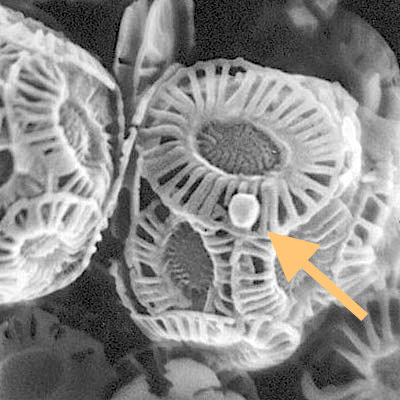
A coccolithovirus, Emiliania huxleyi virus 86 (arrowed), infecting an Emiliania huxleyi coccolithophore. This giant marine virus has one of the largest known virus genomes.

Coccolithophores are one of the more abundant primary producers in the ocean. As such, they are a large contributor to the primary productivity of the tropical and subtropical oceans, however, exactly how much has yet to have been recorded.

==== Dependence on nutrients ====
The ratio between the concentrations of nitrogen, phosphorus and silicate in particular areas of the ocean dictates competitive dominance within phytoplankton communities. Each ratio essentially tips the odds in favor of either diatoms or other groups of phytoplankton, such as coccolithophores. A low silicate to nitrogen and phosphorus ratio allows coccolithophores to outcompete other phytoplankton species; however, when silicate to phosphorus to nitrogen ratios are high coccolithophores are outcompeted by diatoms. The increase in agricultural processes lead to eutrophication of waters and thus, coccolithophore blooms in these high nitrogen and phosphorus, low silicate environments.

==== Impact on water column productivity ====
The calcite in calcium carbonate allows coccoliths to scatter more light than they absorb. This has two important consequences: 1) Surface waters become brighter, meaning they have a higher albedo, and 2) there is induced photoinhibition, meaning photosythetic production is diminished due to an excess of light. In case 1), a high concentration of coccoliths leads to a simultaneous increase in surface water temperature and decrease in the temperature of deeper waters. This results in more stratification in the water column and a decrease in the vertical mixing of nutrients. However, a 2012 study estimated that the overall effect of coccolithophores on the increase in radiative forcing of the ocean is less than that from anthropogenic factors. Therefore, the overall result of large blooms of coccolithophores is a decrease in water column productivity, rather than a contribution to global warming.

==== Predator-prey interactions ====
Their predators include the common predators of all phytoplankton including small fish, zooplankton, and shellfish larvae. Viruses specific to this species have been isolated from several locations worldwide and appear to play a major role in spring bloom dynamics.

===== Toxicity =====
No environmental evidence of coccolithophore toxicity has been reported, but they belong to the class Prymnesiophyceae which contain orders with toxic species. Toxic species have been found in the genera Prymnesium Massart and Chrysochromulina Lackey. Members of the genus Prymnesium have been found to produce haemolytic compounds, the agent responsible for toxicity. Some of these toxic species are responsible for large fish kills and can be accumulated in organisms such as shellfish; transferring it through the food chain. In laboratory tests for toxicity members of the oceanic coccolithophore genera Emiliania, Gephyrocapsa, Calcidiscus and Coccolithus were shown to be non-toxic as were species of the coastal genus Hymenomonas, however several species of Pleurochrysis and Jomonlithus, both coastal genera were toxic to Artemia.

=== Community interactions ===
Coccolithophorids are predominantly found as single, free-floating haploid or diploid cells.

==== Competition ====
Most phytoplankton need sunlight and nutrients from the ocean to survive, so they thrive in areas with large inputs of nutrient rich water upwelling from the lower levels of the ocean. Most coccolithophores require sunlight only for energy production, and have a higher ratio of nitrate uptake over ammonium uptake (nitrogen is required for growth and can be used directly from nitrate but not ammonium). Because of this they thrive in still, nutrient-poor environments where other phytoplankton are starving. Trade-offs associated with these faster growth rates include a smaller cell radius and lower cell volume than other types of phytoplankton.

=== Viral infection and coevolution ===
Giant DNA-containing viruses are known to lytically infect coccolithophores, particularly E. huxleyi. These viruses, known as E. huxleyi viruses (EhVs), appear to infect the coccosphere coated diploid phase of the life cycle almost exclusively. It has been proposed that as the haploid organism is not infected and therefore not affected by the virus, the co-evolutionary "arms race" between coccolithophores and these viruses does not follow the classic Red Queen evolutionary framework, but instead a "Cheshire Cat" ecological dynamic. More recent work has suggested that viral synthesis of sphingolipids and induction of programmed cell death provides a more direct link to study a Red Queen-like coevolutionary arms race at least between the coccolithoviruses and diploid organism.

== Evolution and diversity ==
Coccolithophores are members of the clade Haptophyta, which is a sister clade to Centrohelida, which are both in Haptista. The oldest known coccolithophores are known from the Late Triassic, around the Norian-Rhaetian boundary. Diversity steadily increased over the course of the Mesozoic, reaching its apex during the Late Cretaceous. However, there was a sharp drop during the Cretaceous-Paleogene extinction event, when more than 90% of coccolithophore species became extinct. Coccoliths reached another, lower apex of diversity during the Paleocene-Eocene thermal maximum, but have subsequently declined since the Oligocene due to decreasing global temperatures, with species that produced large and heavily calcified coccoliths most heavily affected.

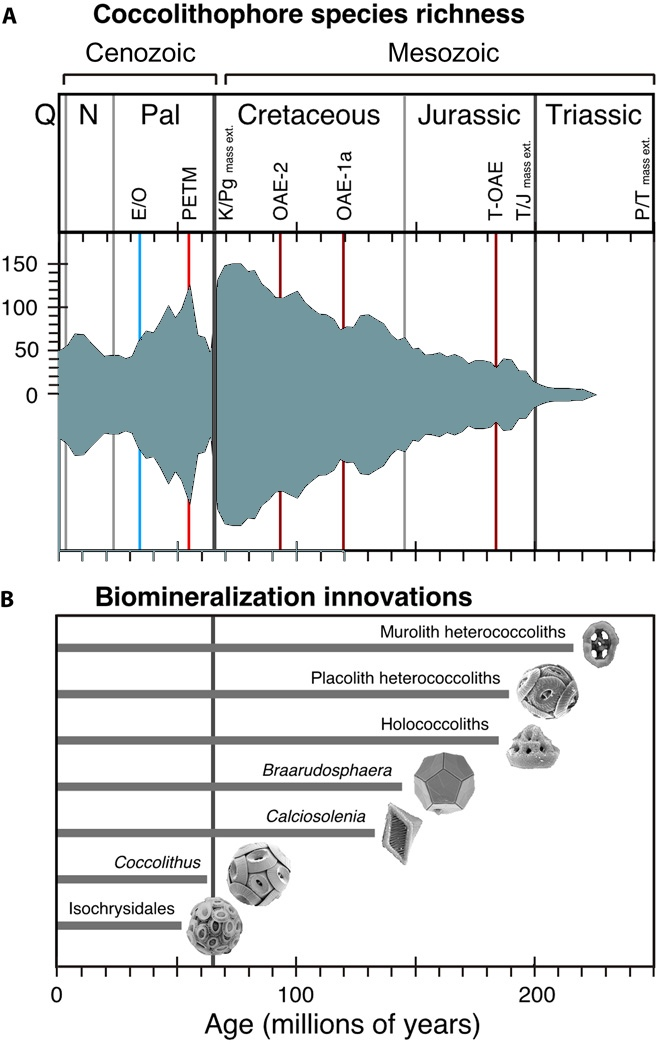
Evolutionary history of coccolithophores: (A) Coccolithophore species richness over time; (B) The fossil record of major coccolithophore biomineralization innovations and morphogroups.

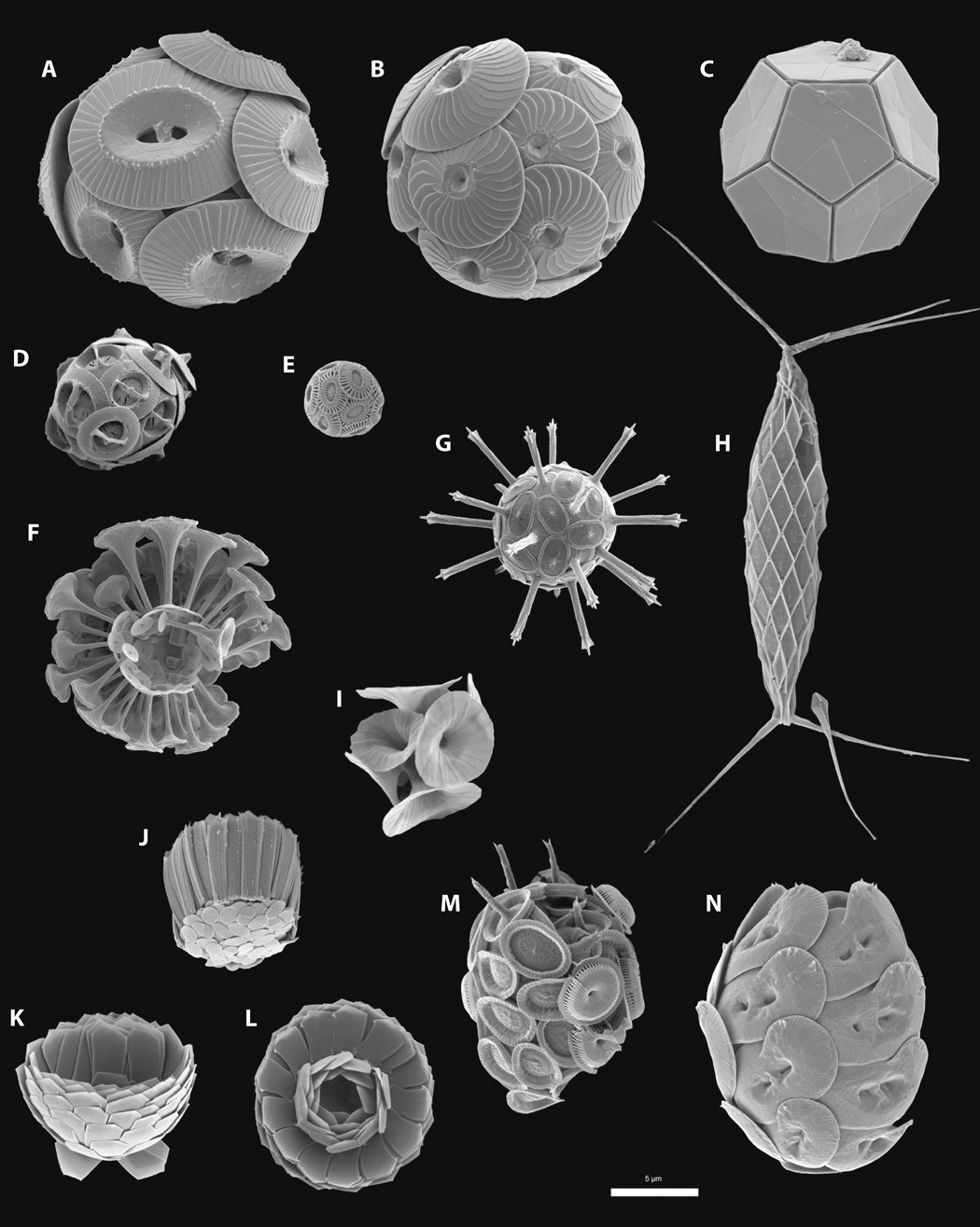
Coccolithophore diversity. Emiliania huxleyi (E), the reference species for coccolithophore studies, is contrasted with a range of other species spanning the biodiversity of modern coccolithophores. All images are scanning electron micrographs of cells collected by seawater filtration from the open ocean. Species illustrated: (A) Coccolithus pelagicus, (B) Calcidiscus leptoporus, (C) Braarudosphaera bigelowii, (D) Gephyrocapsa oceanica, (E) Emiliania huxleyi, (F) Discosphaera tubifera, (G) Rhabdosphaera clavigera, (H) Calciosolenia murrayi, (I) Umbellosphaera irregularis, (J) Gladiolithus flabellatus, (K and L) Florisphaera profunda, (M) Syracosphaera pulchra, and (N) Helicosphaera carteri. Scale bar is 5 μm.

== Coccolithophore shells ==
- Exoskeleton: coccospheres and coccoliths

Each coccolithophore encloses itself in a protective shell of coccoliths, calcified scales which make up its exoskeleton or coccosphere. The coccoliths are created inside the coccolithophore cell and while some species maintain a single layer throughout life only producing new coccoliths as the cell grows, others continually produce and shed coccoliths.

=== Composition ===
The primary constituent of coccoliths is calcium carbonate, or chalk. Calcium carbonate is transparent, so the organisms' photosynthetic activity is not compromised by encapsulation in a coccosphere.

=== Formation ===
Coccoliths are produced by a biomineralization process known as coccolithogenesis. Generally, calcification of coccoliths occurs in the presence of light, and these scales are produced much more during the exponential phase of growth than the stationary phase. Although not yet entirely understood, the biomineralization process is tightly regulated by calcium signaling. Calcite formation begins in the golgi complex where protein templates nucleate the formation of CaCO_{3} crystals and complex acidic polysaccharides control the shape and growth of these crystals. As each scale is produced, it is exported in a Golgi-derived vesicle and added to the inner surface of the coccosphere. This means that the most recently produced coccoliths may lie beneath older coccoliths. Depending upon the phytoplankton's stage in the life cycle, two different types of coccoliths may be formed. Holococcoliths are produced only in the haploid phase, lack radial symmetry, and are composed of anywhere from hundreds to thousands of similar minute (ca 0.1 μm) rhombic calcite crystals. These crystals are thought to form at least partially outside the cell. Heterococcoliths occur only in the diploid phase, have radial symmetry, and are composed of relatively few complex crystal units (fewer than 100). Although they are rare, combination coccospheres, which contain both holococcoliths and heterococcoliths, have been observed in the plankton recording coccolithophore life cycle transitions. Finally, the coccospheres of some species are highly modified with various appendages made of specialized coccoliths.

=== Function ===
While the exact function of the coccosphere is unclear, many potential functions have been proposed. Most obviously coccoliths may protect the phytoplankton from predators. It also appears that it helps them to create a more stable pH. During photosynthesis carbon dioxide is removed from the water, making it more basic. Also calcification removes carbon dioxide, but chemistry behind it leads to the opposite pH reaction; it makes the water more acidic. The combination of photosynthesis and calcification therefore even out each other regarding pH changes. In addition, these exoskeletons may confer an advantage in energy production, as coccolithogenesis seems highly coupled with photosynthesis. Organic precipitation of calcium carbonate from bicarbonate solution produces free carbon dioxide directly within the cellular body of the alga, this additional source of gas is then available to the Coccolithophore for photosynthesis. It has been suggested that they may provide a cell-wall like barrier to isolate intracellular chemistry from the marine environment. More specific, defensive properties of coccoliths may include protection from osmotic changes, chemical or mechanical shock, and short-wavelength light. It has also been proposed that the added weight of multiple layers of coccoliths allows the organism to sink to lower, more nutrient rich layers of the water and conversely, that coccoliths add buoyancy, stopping the cell from sinking to dangerous depths. Coccolith appendages have also been proposed to serve several functions, such as inhibiting grazing by zooplankton.

=== Uses ===
Coccoliths are the main component of the Chalk, a Late Cretaceous rock formation which outcrops widely in southern England and forms the White Cliffs of Dover, and of other similar rocks in many other parts of the world. At the present day sedimented coccoliths are a major component of the calcareous oozes that cover up to 35% of the ocean floor and is kilometres thick in places. Because of their abundance and wide geographic ranges, the coccoliths which make up the layers of this ooze and the chalky sediment formed as it is compacted serve as valuable microfossils.

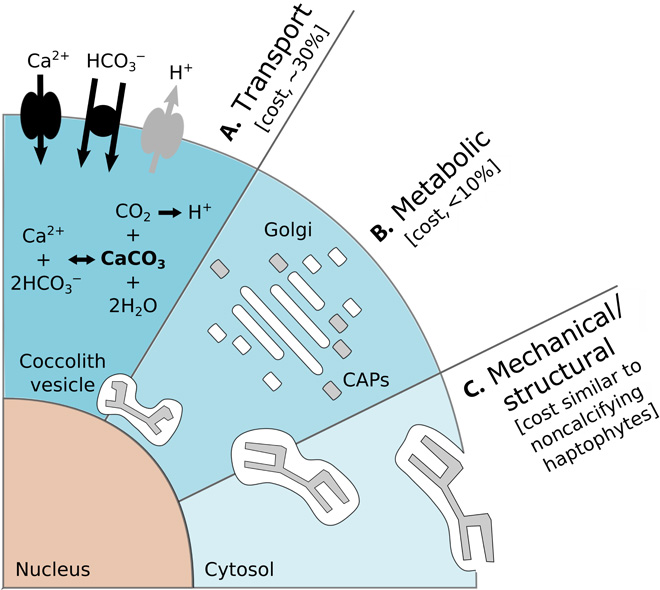
Energetic costs of coccolithophore calcification. Energetic costs reported as a percentage of total photosynthetic budget.

Calcification, the biological production of calcium carbonate (CaCO_{3}), is a key process in the marine carbon cycle. Coccolithophores are the major planktonic group responsible for pelagic CaCO_{3} production. The diagram on the right shows the energetic costs of coccolithophore calcification:

(A) Transport processes include the transport into the cell from the surrounding seawater of primary calcification substrates Ca_{2+} and HCO_{3}^{−} (black arrows) and the removal of the end product H^{+} from the cell (gray arrow). The transport of Ca_{2+} through the cytoplasm to the CV is the dominant cost associated with calcification.

(B) Metabolic processes include the synthesis of CAPs (gray rectangles) by the Golgi complex (white rectangles) that regulate the nucleation and geometry of CaCO_{3} crystals. The completed coccolith (gray plate) is a complex structure of intricately arranged CAPs and CaCO_{3} crystals.

(C) Mechanical and structural processes account for the secretion of the completed coccoliths that are transported from their original position adjacent to the nucleus to the cell periphery, where they are transferred to the surface of the cell. The costs associated with these processes are likely to be comparable to organic-scale exocytosis in noncalcifying haptophyte algae.

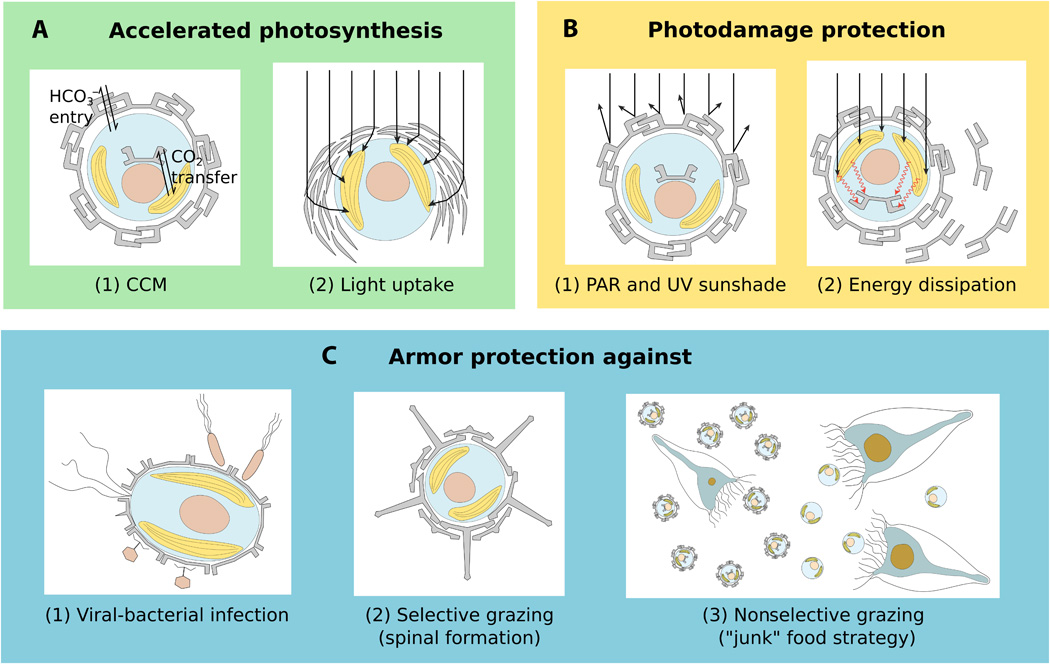
Benefits of coccolithophore calcification

The diagram on the left shows the benefits of coccolithophore calcification. (A) Accelerated photosynthesis includes CCM (1) and enhanced light uptake via scattering of scarce photons for deep-dwelling species (2). (B) Protection from photodamage includes sunshade protection from ultraviolet (UV) light and photosynthetic active radiation (PAR) (1) and energy dissipation under high-light conditions (2). (C) Armor protection includes protection against viral/bacterial infections (1) and grazing by selective (2) and nonselective (3) grazers.

The degree by which calcification can adapt to ocean acidification is presently unknown. Cell physiological examinations found the essential H^{+} efflux (stemming from the use of HCO_{3}^{−} for intra-cellular calcification) to become more costly with ongoing ocean acidification as the electrochemical H^{+} inside-out gradient is reduced and passive proton outflow impeded. Adapted cells would have to activate proton channels more frequently, adjust their membrane potential, and/or lower their internal pH. Reduced intra-cellular pH would severely affect the entire cellular machinery and require other processes (e.g. photosynthesis) to co-adapt in order to keep H^{+} efflux alive. The obligatory H^{+} efflux associated with calcification may therefore pose a fundamental constraint on adaptation which may potentially explain why "calcification crisis" were possible during long-lasting (thousands of years) CO_{2} perturbation events even though evolutionary adaption to changing carbonate chemistry conditions is possible within one year. Unraveling these fundamental constraints and the limits of adaptation should be a focus in future coccolithophore studies because knowing them is the key information required to understand to what extent the calcification response to carbonate chemistry perturbations can be compensated by evolution.

Silicate- or cellulose-armored functional groups such as diatoms and dinoflagellates do not need to sustain the calcification-related H^{+} efflux. Thus, they probably do not need to adapt in order to keep costs for the production of structural elements low. On the contrary, dinoflagellates (except for calcifying species; with generally inefficient CO_{2}-fixing RuBisCO enzymes may even profit from chemical changes since photosynthetic carbon fixation as their source of structural elements in the form of cellulose should be facilitated by the ocean acidification-associated CO_{2} fertilization. Under the assumption that any form of shell/exoskeleton protects phytoplankton against predation non-calcareous armors may be the preferable solution to realize protection in a future ocean.

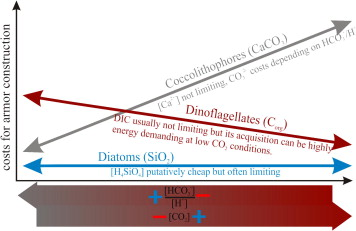
Representation of comparative energetic effort for armor construction in three major shell-forming phytoplankton taxa as a function of carbonate chemistry conditions

The diagram on the right is a representation of how the comparative energetic effort for armor construction in diatoms, dinoflagellates and coccolithophores appear to operate. The frustule (diatom shell) seems to be the most inexpensive armor under all circumstances because diatoms typically outcompete all other groups when silicate is available. The coccosphere is relatively inexpensive under sufficient [CO_{2}], high [HCO_{3}^{−}], and low [H^{+}] because the substrate is saturating and protons are easily released into seawater. In contrast, the construction of thecal elements, which are organic (cellulose) plates that constitute the dinoflagellate shell, should rather be favored at high H^{+} concentrations because these usually coincide with high [CO_{2}]. Under these conditions dinoflagellates could down-regulate the energy-consuming operation of carbon concentrating mechanisms to fuel the production of organic source material for their shell. Therefore, a shift in carbonate chemistry conditions toward high [CO_{2}] may promote their competitiveness relative to coccolithophores. However, such a hypothetical gain in competitiveness due to altered carbonate chemistry conditions would not automatically lead to dinoflagellate dominance because a huge number of factors other than carbonate chemistry have an influence on species composition as well.

=== Defence against predation ===
Currently, the evidence supporting or refuting a protective function of the coccosphere against predation is limited. Some researchers found that overall microzooplankton predation rates were reduced during blooms of the coccolithophore Emiliania huxleyi, while others found high microzooplankton grazing rates on natural coccolithophore communities. In 2020, researchers found that in situ ingestion rates of microzooplankton on E. huxleyi did not differ significantly from those on similar sized non-calcifying phytoplankton. In laboratory experiments the heterotrophic dinoflagellate Oxyrrhis marina preferred calcified over non-calcified cells of E. huxleyi, which was hypothesised to be due to size selective feeding behaviour, since calcified cells are larger than non-calcified E. huxleyi. In 2015, Harvey et al. investigated predation by the dinoflagellate O. marina on different genotypes of non-calcifying E. huxleyi as well as calcified strains that differed in the degree of calcification. They found that the ingestion rate of O. marina was dependent on the genotype of E. huxleyi that was offered, rather than on their degree of calcification. In the same study, however, the authors found that predators which preyed on non-calcifying genotypes grew faster than those fed with calcified cells. In 2018, Strom et al. compared predation rates of the dinoflagellate Amphidinium longum on calcified relative to naked E. huxleyi prey and found no evidence that the coccosphere prevents ingestion by the grazer. Instead, ingestion rates were dependent on the offered genotype of E. huxleyi. Altogether, these two studies suggest that the genotype has a strong influence on ingestion by the microzooplankton species, but if and how calcification protects coccolithophores from microzooplankton predation could not be fully clarified.

== Importance in global climate change ==
=== Impact on the carbon cycle ===
Coccolithophores have both long and short term effects on the carbon cycle. The production of coccoliths requires the uptake of dissolved inorganic carbon and calcium. Calcium carbonate and carbon dioxide are produced from calcium and bicarbonate by the following chemical reaction:

Ca^{2+} + 2HCO^{−}_{3} ⇌ CaCO_{3} + CO_{2} + H_{2}O

Because coccolithophores are photosynthetic organisms, they are able to use some of the CO_{2} released in the calcification reaction for photosynthesis.

However, the production of calcium carbonate drives surface alkalinity down, and in conditions of low alkalinity the CO_{2} is instead released back into the atmosphere. As a result of this, researchers have postulated that large blooms of coccolithophores may contribute to global warming in the short term. A more widely accepted idea, however, is that over the long term coccolithophores contribute to an overall decrease in atmospheric CO_{2} concentrations. During calcification two carbon atoms are taken up and one of them becomes trapped as calcium carbonate. This calcium carbonate sinks to the bottom of the ocean in the form of coccoliths and becomes part of sediment; thus, coccolithophores provide a sink for emitted carbon, mediating the effects of greenhouse gas emissions.

=== Evolutionary responses to ocean acidification ===
Research also suggests that ocean acidification due to increasing concentrations of CO_{2} in the atmosphere may affect the calcification machinery of coccolithophores. This may not only affect immediate events such as increases in population or coccolith production, but also may induce evolutionary adaptation of coccolithophore species over longer periods of time. For example, coccolithophores use H^{+} ion channels in to constantly pump H^{+} ions out of the cell during coccolith production. This allows them to avoid acidosis, as coccolith production would otherwise produce a toxic excess of H^{+} ions. When the function of these ion channels is disrupted, the coccolithophores stop the calcification process to avoid acidosis, thus forming a feedback loop. Low ocean alkalinity, impairs ion channel function and therefore places evolutionary selective pressure on coccolithophores and makes them (and other ocean calcifiers) vulnerable to ocean acidification. In 2008, field evidence indicating an increase in calcification of newly formed ocean sediments containing coccolithophores bolstered the first ever experimental data showing that an increase in ocean CO_{2} concentration results in an increase in calcification of these organisms. Decreasing coccolith mass is related to both the increasing concentrations of CO_{2} and decreasing concentrations of CO^{2−}_{3} in the world's oceans. This lower calcification is assumed to put coccolithophores at ecological disadvantage. Some species like Calcidiscus leptoporus, however, are not affected in this way, while the most abundant coccolithophore species, E. huxleyi might be (study results are mixed). Also, highly calcified coccolithophorids have been found in conditions of low CaCO_{3} saturation contrary to predictions. Understanding the effects of increasing ocean acidification on coccolithophore species is absolutely essential to predicting the future chemical composition of the ocean, particularly its carbonate chemistry. Viable conservation and management measures will come from future research in this area. Groups like the European-based CALMARO are monitoring the responses of coccolithophore populations to varying pH's and working to determine environmentally sound measures of control.

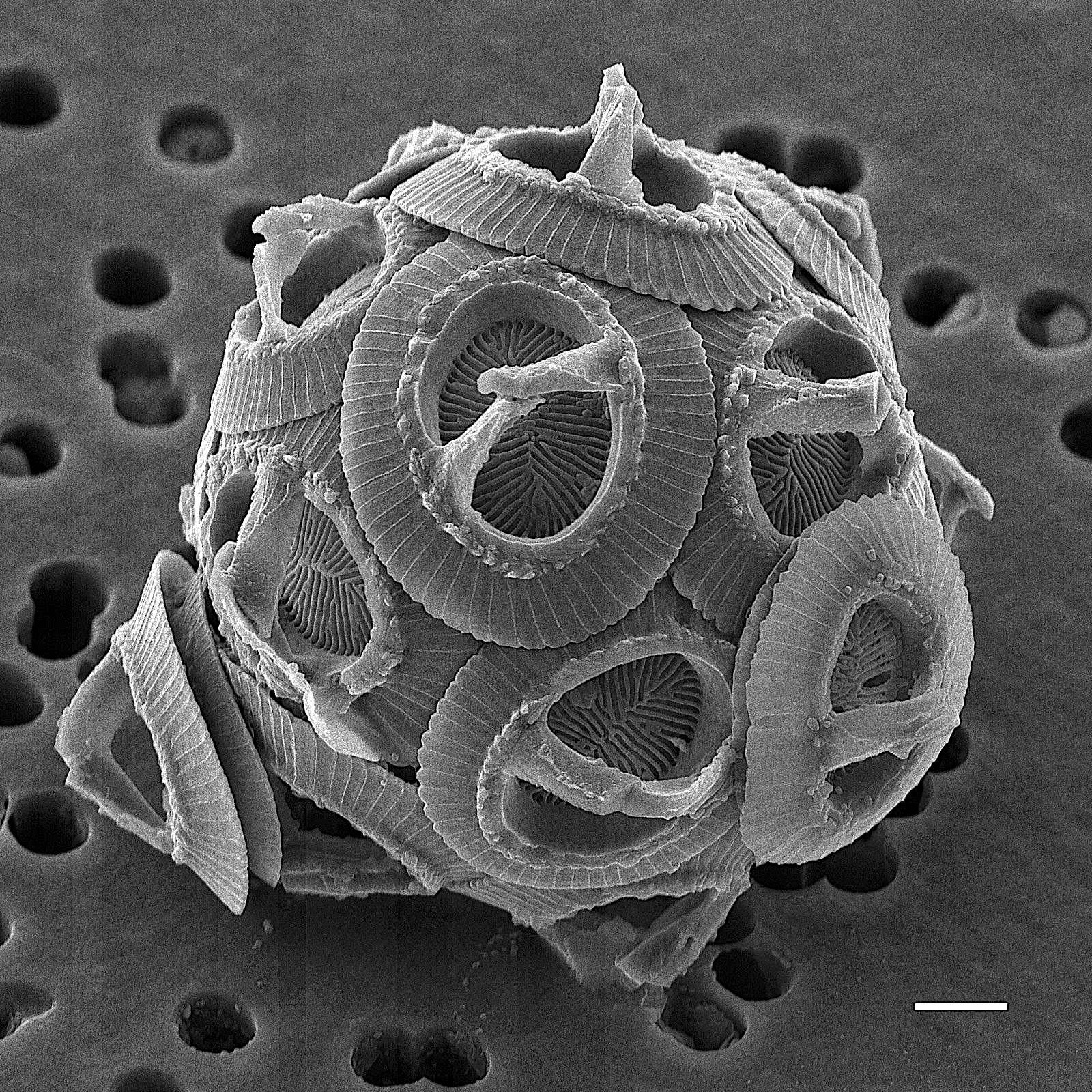
Gephyrocapsa oceanica (scale bar is 1 μm)

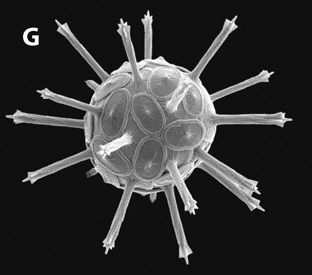
Rhabdosphaera clavigera

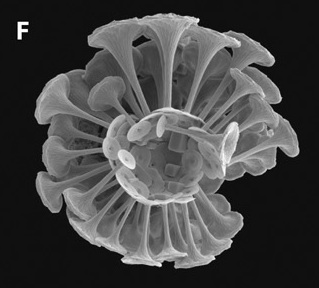
Discosphaera tubifera

=== Impact on microfossil record ===
Coccolith fossils are prominent and valuable calcareous microfossils. They are the largest global source of biogenic calcium carbonate, and significantly contribute to the global carbon cycle. They are the main constituent of chalk deposits such as the white cliffs of Dover.

Of particular interest are fossils dating back to the Palaeocene-Eocene Thermal Maximum 55 million years ago. This period is thought to correspond most directly to the current levels of CO_{2} in the ocean. Finally, field evidence of coccolithophore fossils in rock were used to show that the deep-sea fossil record bears a rock record bias similar to the one that is widely accepted to affect the land-based fossil record.

=== Impact on the oceans ===
The coccolithophorids help in regulating the temperature of the oceans. They thrive in warm seas and release dimethyl sulfide (DMS) into the air whose nuclei help to produce thicker clouds to block the sun. When the oceans cool, the number of coccolithophorids decrease and the amount of clouds also decrease. When there are fewer clouds blocking the sun, the temperature also rises. This, therefore, maintains the balance and equilibrium of nature.

== See also ==
- CLAW hypothesis
- Dimethyl sulfide
- Dimethylsulfoniopropionate
- Emiliania huxleyi virus 86
- Pleurochrysis carterae
- Calcidiscus leptoporus
- Gephyrocapsa huxleyi
