= Dissolved inorganic carbon =

Sum of inorganic carbon species in a solution

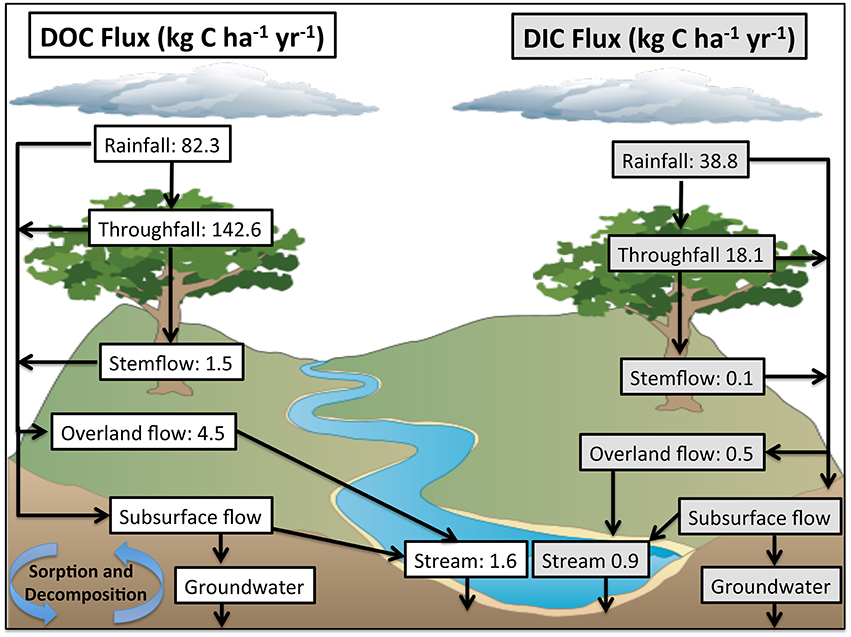
Annual DOC and DIC fluxes in the Tanguro Ranch watershed Average annual flux of DOC and DIC in rainfall, throughfall, stemflow, overland flow, and stream flow.

Dissolved inorganic carbon (DIC) is the sum of the aqueous species of inorganic carbon in a solution. Carbon compounds can be distinguished as either organic or inorganic, and as dissolved or particulate, depending on their composition. Organic carbon forms the backbone of key component of organic compounds such as – proteins, lipids, carbohydrates, and nucleic acids.

Inorganic carbon is found primarily in simple compounds such as carbon dioxide, carbonic acid, bicarbonate, and carbonate (CO_{2}, H_{2}CO_{3}, HCO^{−}_{3}, CO^{2−}_{3} respectively). Dissolved inorganic carbon (DIC) includes three major aqueous species, CO_{2}, HCO^{−}_{3} ,CO^{2−}_{3}, and to a lesser extent their complexes in solution with metal ions.

== Marine ecosystems ==
=== Solubility pump ===
Aqueous carbon dioxide reacts with water to form carbonic acid which is very unstable and will dissociate rapidly into hydronium and bicarbonate. Therefore, in seawater, dissolved inorganic carbon is commonly referred to as the collection of bicarbonate, carbonate ions, and dissolved carbon dioxide (CO_{2}, H_{2}CO_{3}, HCO^{−}_{3}, CO^{2−}_{3}).

CO_{2}(aq) + H_{2}O ⇌ H_{2}CO_{3} ⇌ HCO^{−}_{3} + H^{+} ⇌ CO^{2−}_{3} + 2 H^{+}

More than 99% of dissolved inorganic carbon is in the form of bicarbonate and carbonate ions meaning that most of the ocean’s carbon storing ability is due to this chemical reactivity. Sea-air flux of CO_{2} and the resulting dissolved inorganic carbon is affected by physical processes such as strong winds and vertical mixing, and the biological processes of photosynthesis, respiration, and decomposition.

=== Biological pump ===
Dissolved inorganic carbon is a key component of the biological pump, which is defined as the amount of biologically produced organic carbon flux from the upper ocean to the deep ocean. Dissolved inorganic carbon in the form of carbon dioxide is fixed into organic carbon through photosynthesis. Respiration is the reverse process and consumes organic carbon to produce inorganic carbon. Photosynthesis, and the biological pump, is dependent on the availability of inorganic nutrients and carbon dioxide.

Photosynthesis: 6 CO_{2} + 6 H_{2}O + light → C_{6}H_{12}O_{6} + 6 O_{2}

Respiration: C_{6}H_{12}O_{6} + 6 O_{2} → 6 CO_{2} + 6 H_{2}O + energy

Oceanographers seek to understand the metabolic state of the ocean, or the efficiency of the biological pump, by estimating the net community production (NCP) which is the gross primary productivity (GPP) minus the community respiration (sum of the respiration of the local autotrophs and heterotrophs). An efficient biological pump increases biological export to the deeper ocean which has been hypothesized to suppress CO_{2} outgassing in the upper ocean.

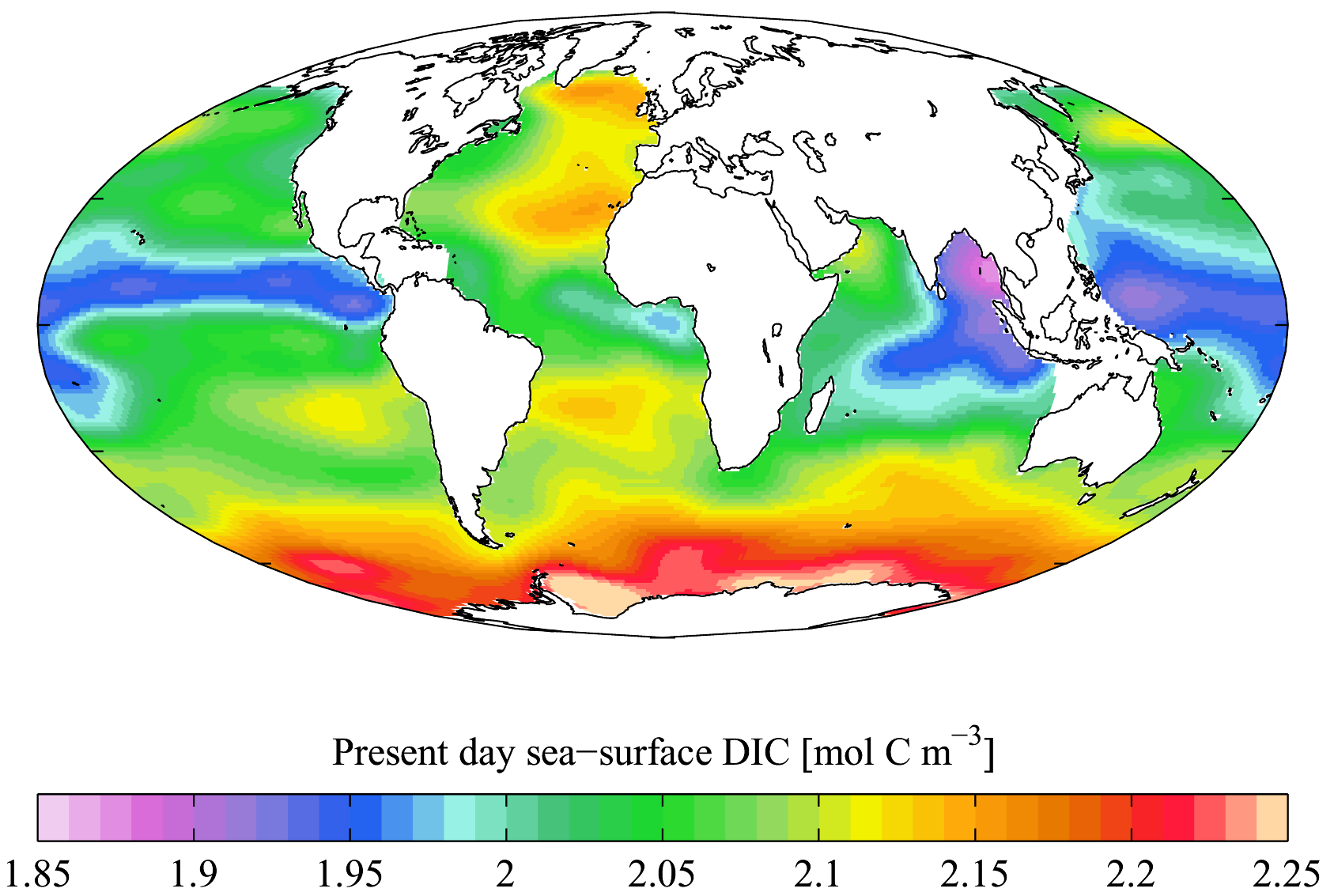
"Present day" (1990s)

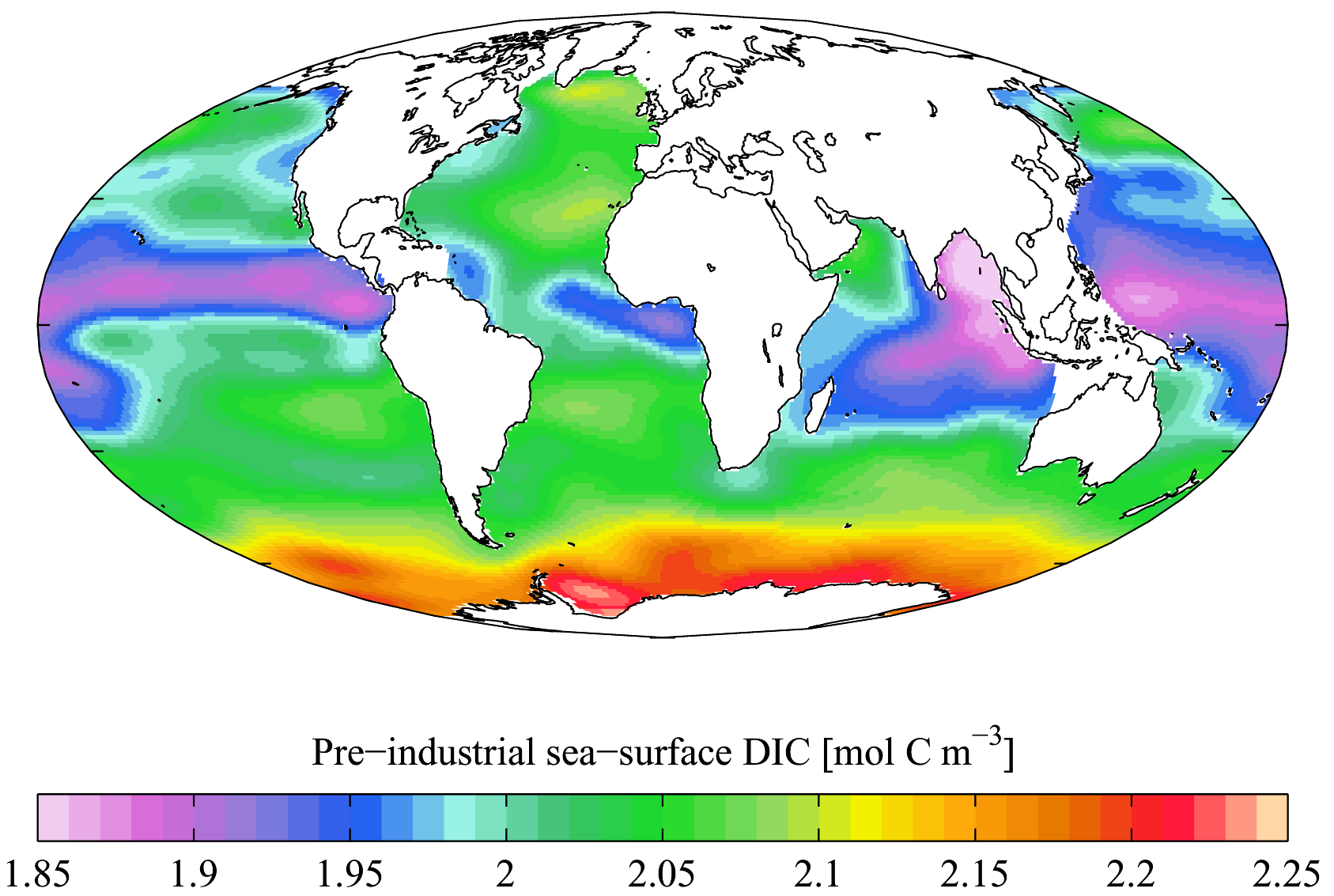
Pre-Industrial Revolution (1700s)

Sea surface DIC concentration (from GLODAP climatology)

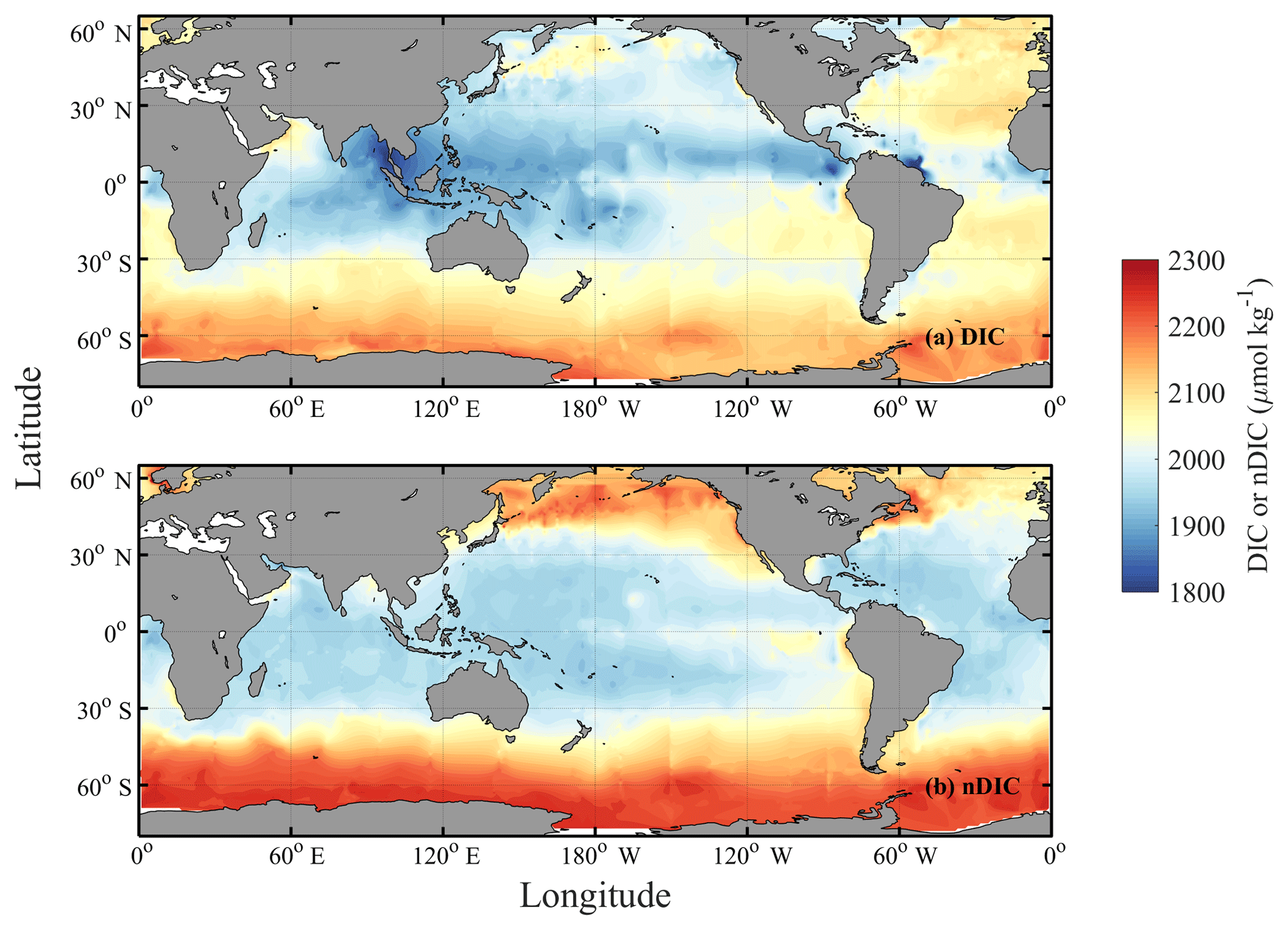
Spatial distribution of ocean surface DIC Spatial distributions of DIC and nDIC. (a) DIC (normalized to year 2005); (b) salinity-normalized DIC (nDIC, DIC normalized to reference year of 2005 and salinity of 35) in the surface global ocean. The latitudinal trends are clear, particularly for nDIC.

=== Carbonate pump ===
The carbonate pump is sometimes referred to as the “hard tissue” component of the biological pump. Some surface marine organisms, like Coccolithophores, produce hard structures out of calcium carbonate, a form of particulate inorganic carbon, by fixing bicarbonate. This fixation of DIC is an important part of the oceanic carbon cycle.

Ca^{2+} + 2 HCO^{−}_{3} → CaCO_{3} + CO_{2} + H_{2}O

While the biological carbon pump fixes inorganic carbon (CO_{2}) into particulate organic carbon in the form of sugar (C_{6}H_{12}O_{6}), the carbonate pump fixes inorganic bicarbonate and causes a net release of CO_{2}. In this way, the carbonate pump could be termed the carbonate counter pump. It works counter to the biological pump by counteracting the CO_{2} flux from the biological pump.

=== Measurement ===
Oceanographers and engineers continue to find novel and more accurate methods of measuring carbon content in seawater. One method is to collect water samples and directly measure the DIC by using a TOC analyzer. Samples can be combined with stable isotope ratios ^{13}C/^{12}C, alkalinity measurements, and estimation of physical processes, to create diagnostic techniques. Researchers at Scripps Institution of Oceanography developed a tool that uses flow injection analysis to measures microfluidic samples of seawater and continuously monitor dissolved inorganic carbon content.

== See also ==
- Alkalinity (total alkalinity; A_{T})
- Bjerrum plot
- Dissolved organic carbon
- Fugacity (carbon dioxide fugacity; f_{CO_{2}})
- Ocean acidification
- pH
- Total organic carbon
