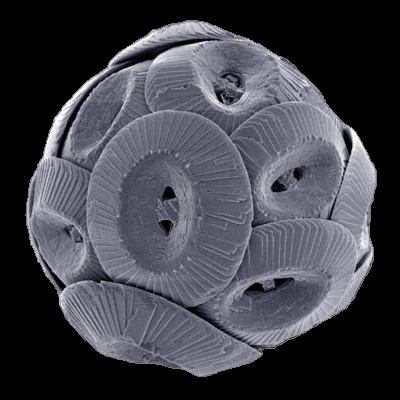
- Fossil of Coccolithus pelagicus, about 10 μm across

Scientific classification
- Domain: Eukaryota
- Clade: Haptista
- Division: Haptophyta
- Class: Prymnesiophyceae
- Order: Coccolithales
- Family: Coccolithaceae
- Genus: Coccolithus; E.H.L. Schwarz, 1894

= Coccolithus =

Genus of single-celled organisms

Coccolithus is a genus of unicellular haptophytes in the family Coccolithaceae.

== Species ==
The species in this genus include:

- Coccolithus oceanicus
- Coccolithus pelagicus
- Coccolithus pliopelagicus
