= Plymouth Marine Laboratory =

English research laboratory

Coordinates: 50°21′57″N 4°08′52″W

- Established: 1988
- Field of research: Marine science research centre
- Staff: 170
- Students: 30
- Location: Prospect Place, Plymouth, Devon, England
- Affiliations: Natural Environment Research Council
- Website: www.pml.ac.uk

Plymouth Marine Laboratory (abbreviated as PML) is a marine research organization and registered charity based in the city of Plymouth, England. It is a partner of the UK Research & Innovation's Natural Environment Research Council (NERC). PML's chair is Nigel Godefroy, its chief executive is Prof. Icarus Allen and its patron is the film-maker James Cameron.

== Research and capability ==
Research activity at PML broadly investigates global-scale issues of climate change and sustainability. PML's core capabilities are centred around biogeochemistry and systems science, ecosystem health and human health, and sustainable development and biodiversity. It has particular capacity around Earth observation, ecosystem modelling, microbial ecology, Blue biotechnology, socioeconomics and policy advice.

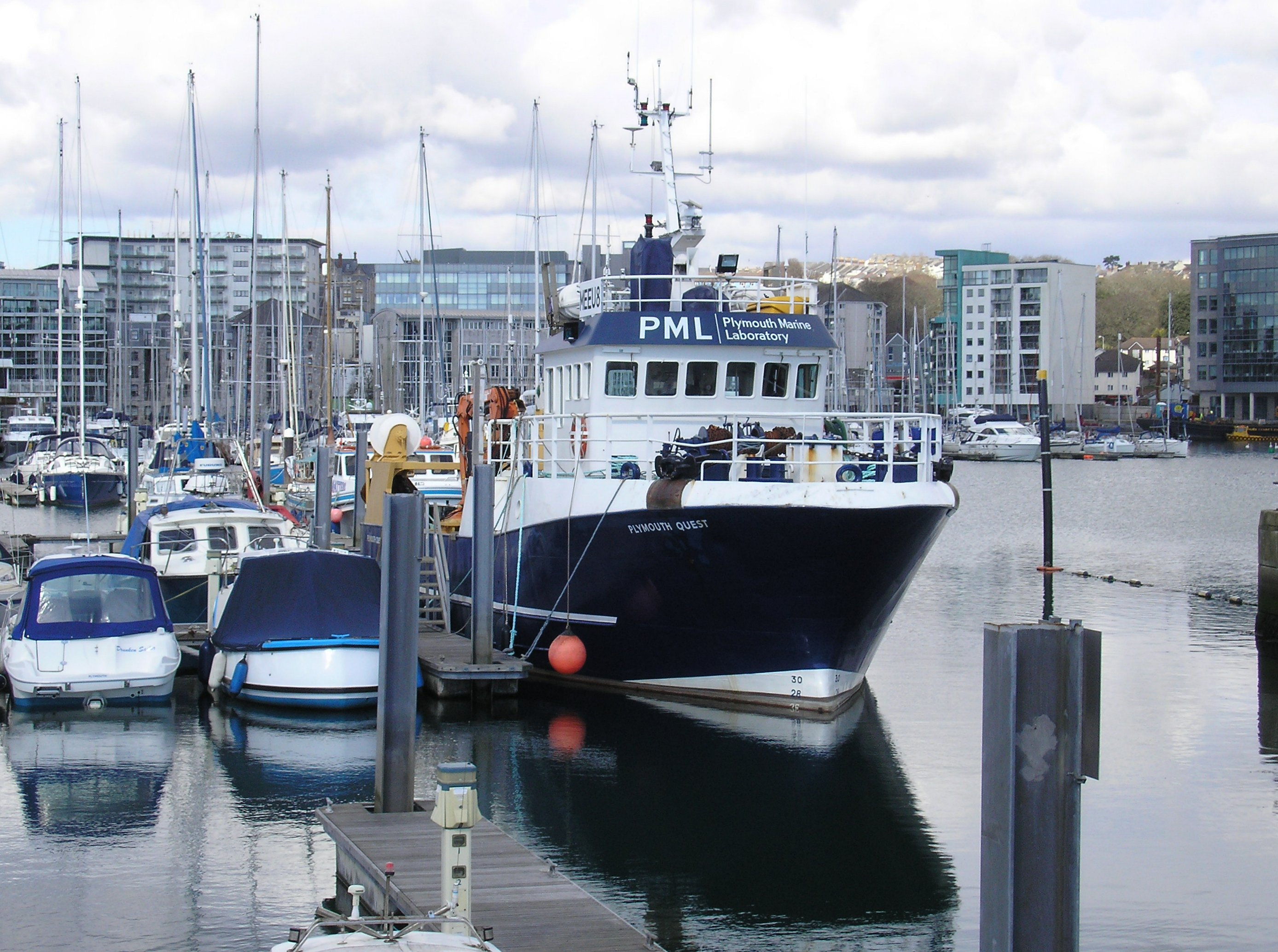
The Plymouth Marine Laboratory research ship "Plymouth Quest"

Specific research activities include the monitoring of ocean acidity and its effects on corals and shellfish, and this information is reported to the UK government. As part of its research into sustainability, PML uses technology such as photo-bioreactors to cultivate algae that could be used in the production of biofuels or in the treatment of waste water. Aside from its environmental research, PML also works alongside the Boots Group to investigate the use of algae in skin-care products, since these organisms utilise sunscreen-like compounds to protect themselves from the sun.

Within its Seawater Hall, PML contains an in-house, fully contained, algal scale-up pilot plant. This contains a 550L biofence photobioreactor and a 1200L raceway pond system, as well as a range of smaller bubble column reactor systems at 3.5L and 11L capacity for smaller scale algal production. These facilities are regularly used to generate dried algal biomass on the scale of grams to hundreds of grams. This algal innovation centre also investigates a range of downstream processing techniques for algal harvesting. In addition to large-scale investigations, PML has a Single Cell Genomics facility: a dedicated clean room environment for single cell isolation, equipped with a high speed Atomic Force Microscope, cell-sorting flow cytometry capabilities and a number of liquid-handling machines.

PML has a wholly owned trading subsidiary, PML Applications Ltd., which has been created to facilitate the exploitation and application of PML research and its products and to provide a more appropriate interface for working with end users, industrial and commercial partners.

== History ==
The Plymouth Marine Laboratory was founded in 1988, mainly due to the recommendations of a House of Lords report. It was formed by drawing some elements of the Laboratory of the Marine Biological Association (MBA) with the NERC Institute for Marine Environmental Research (IMER).

On 1 April 2002, PML changed from being a wholly owned NERC research centre to an independent organisation with charitable status.

== Affiliations ==
- Partner in the National Partnership for Ocean Prediction (NCOP)
- Member of the Peninsular Microbiology Forum
- Co-ordinator of the Atlantic Meridional Transect (AMT)
- Member and Secretariat host of the Partnership for Observation of the Global Oceans (POGO)
- Non-country partner of the Partnerships in Environmental Management for the Seas of East Asia (PEMSEA)
