= Atlantic Meridional Transect =

Oceanographic research in the South Atlantic

The Atlantic Meridional Transect (abbreviated as AMT) is a multi-decadal oceanographic programme that undertakes biological, chemical and physical research during annual voyages between the UK and destinations in the South Atlantic. The ongoing AMT programme was begun in 1995 to assess biological processes in the Atlantic Ocean from the mesoscale through to basin-scale. An early activity of the programme was the calibration of measurements and products produced by the SeaWiFS (1997-2010) satellite-based sensor for ocean chlorophyll.

The AMT programme is led by Plymouth Marine Laboratory, with support from the National Oceanography Centre. It is currently funded by the Natural Environment Research Council (NERC). Since its inception in 1995, the programme has undertaken 26 research cruises with 256 scientists drawn from 22 countries. The AMT programme has provided data for more than 300 refereed publications, as well as 75 PhD theses.

The return cruise track of the AMT programme operates between the UK in the North Atlantic and the Falkland Islands, Chile or South Africa in the southern hemisphere, and its total distance can be up to 13,000 kilometres (8,100 mi). The track crosses a number of biogeochemical provinces, including productive temperate and equatorial upwelling systems, and the oligotrophic northern and southern Atlantic ocean gyres. In sampling this diverse range of planktonic ecosystems, the cruises of the AMT programme provide a consistent dataset over a broad spatial scale, and play an important role in understanding the oceanic carbon cycle.
