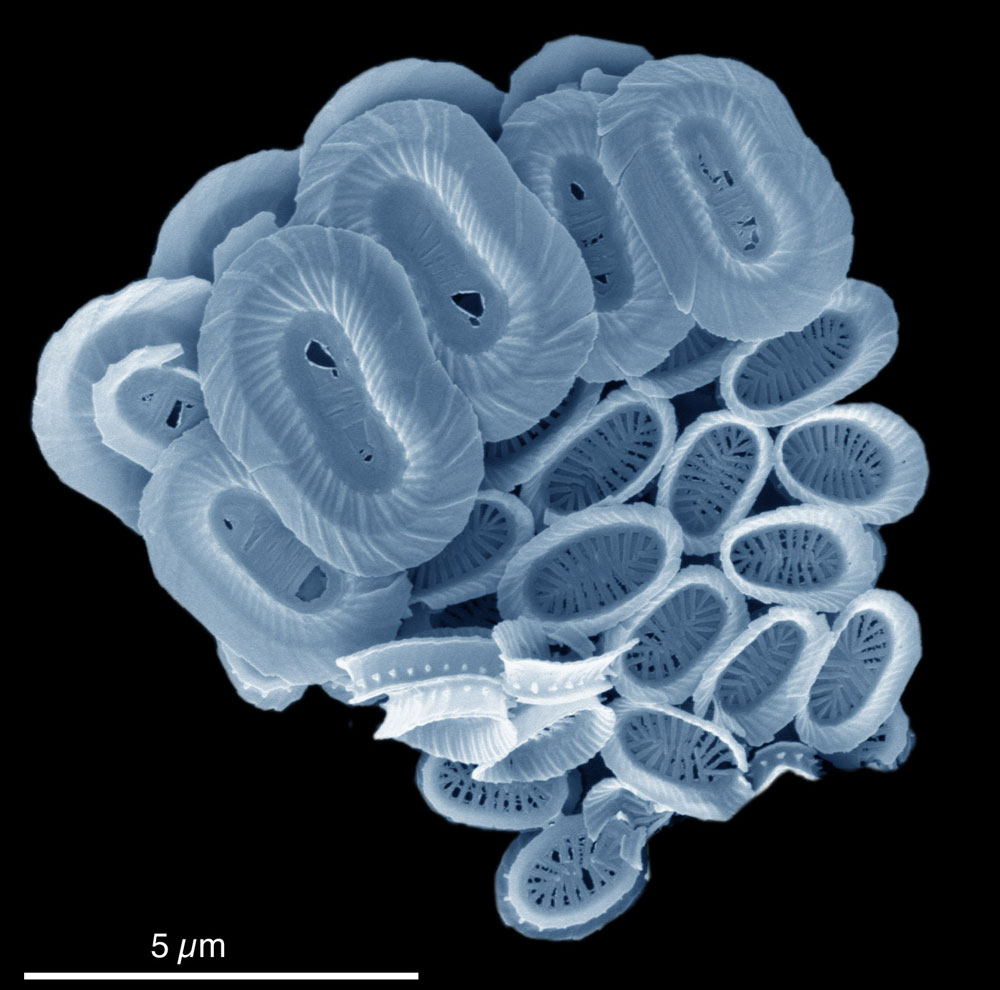
- Electron microscope image of Syracosphaera azureaplaneta (blue color added)

Scientific classification
- Domain: Eukaryota
- Division: Haptophyta
- Class: Prymnesiophyceae
- Order: Syracosphaerales
- Family: Syracosphaeraceae; Lemmermann, 1908

= Syracosphaeraceae =

Family of algae

Syracosphaeraceae is a family of algae consisting of the following genera:

- Calciopappus Gaarder & Ramsfjell, 1954
- Caneosphaera Gaarder, 1977
- Coronosphaera Gaarder, 1977
- Deutschlandia Lohmann, 1912
- Lohmannosphaera Schiller, 1913
- Michaelsarsia Gran, 1912
- Ophiaster Gran, 1912
- Syracosphaera Lohmann, 1902
