= Rhabdosphaeraceae =

Scientific classification
- Domain: Eukaryota
- Clade: Haptista
- Division: Haptophyta
- Class: Prymnesiophyceae
- Order: Syracosphaerales
- Family: Rhabdosphaeraceae; Lemmermann

Family of algae

Rhabdosphaeraceae is a family of algae belonging to the order Syracosphaerales.

== Genera ==
The following is a list of Rhabdosphaeraceae genera:

- Acanthoica Lohmann, 1902
- Algirosphaera Schlauder, 1945
- Anacanthoica Deflandre, 1952
- Cyrtosphaera A.Kleijne, 1992
- Discosphaera Haeckel, 1894
- Palusphaera Lecal, 1966
- Rhabdolithes O.Schmidt, 1870
- Rhabdosphaera Haeckel, 1894
- Solisphaera Bollmann, Cortes, Kleijne, Ostergaard & Young, 2006
