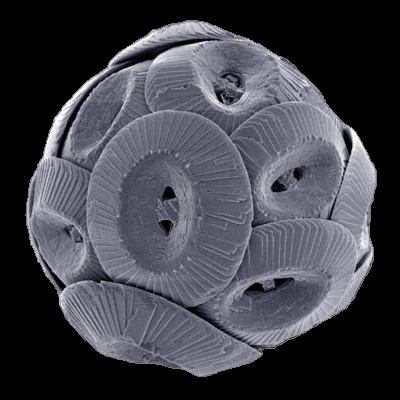

Scientific classification
- Domain: Eukaryota
- Clade: Haptista
- Division: Haptophyta
- Class: Prymnesiophyceae
- Order: Coccolithales; Schwarz

Families
- Calcidiscaceae; Calyptrosphaeraceae; Coccolithaceae; Hymenomonadaceae; Pleurochrysidaceae; Reticulosphaeraceae

= Coccolithales =

Order of single-celled organisms

Coccolithales is an order of Haptophyceae. The Coccolithales has long been considered one of only two orders in the Coccolithophyceae, the other order being the Isochrysidales.
