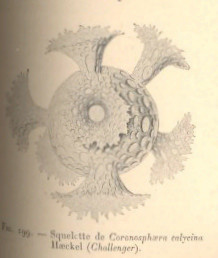
- Coronosphaera calycina

Scientific classification
- Domain: Eukaryota
- Clade: Haptista
- Division: Haptophyta
- Class: Prymnesiophyceae
- Order: Syracosphaerales; W.W.Hay

= Syracosphaerales =

Order of algae

Syracosphaerales is an order of algae consisting of three families:

- Calciosoleniaceae Kamptner, 1937
- Rhabdosphaeraceae Lemmermann, 1908
- Syracosphaeraceae Lemmermann, 1908
