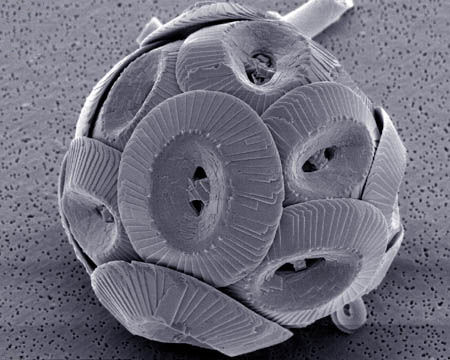
- Coccolithus pelagicus (Coccolithales, fam. Coccolithaceae)

Scientific classification
- Domain: Eukaryota
- Clade: Haptista
- Division: Haptophyta
- Class: Prymnesiophyceae; Casper, 1972, ex Hibberd, 1976

Orders
- †Arkhangelskiellales; Braarudosphaerales; Coccolithales; Coccosphaerales; †Discoasterales; †Eiffellithales; Isochrysidales; Phaeocystales; †Podorhabdales; Prymnesiales; Syracosphaerales; †Watznaueriales; Zygodiscales

Synonyms
- Coccolithophyceae Rothmaler, 1951; Haptophyceae s.s. Christensen, 1962 ex Silva, 1980; Patelliferea Cavalier-Smith, 1993

= Prymnesiophyceae =

Class of algae

Prymnesiophyceae is a haptophyte class. Although it was originally described by Casper in 1972, it did not receive a Latin diagnosis (a requirement for valid publication under the International Code of Botanical Nomenclature) until Hibberd provided one in 1976.

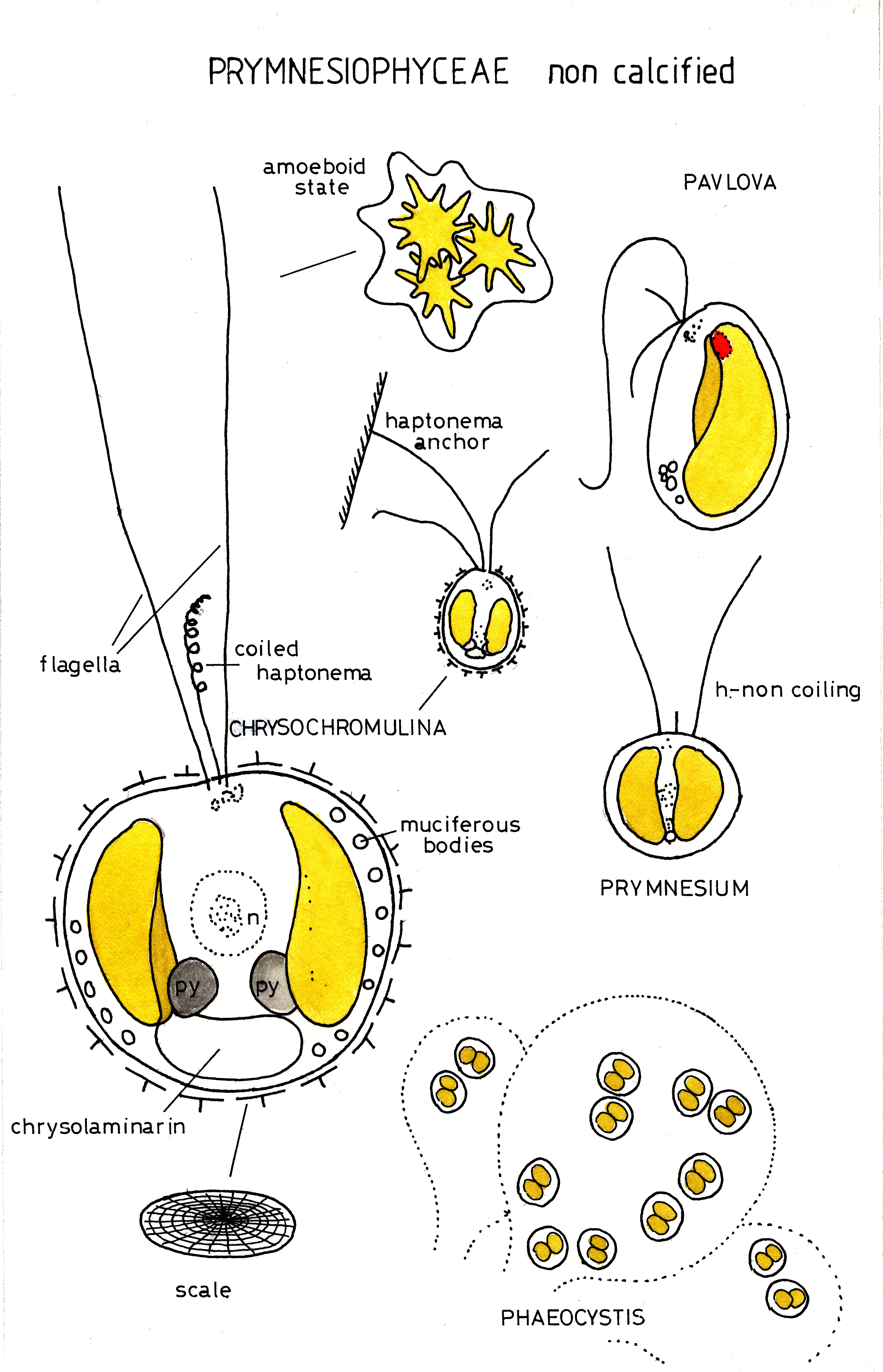
Illustration
