= Great Calcite Belt =

High-calcite region of the Southern Ocean

Yearly cycle of the Great Calcite Belt in the Southern Ocean. The belt appears during the southern hemisphere summer as a light teal stripe.

The Great Calcite Belt (GCB) refers to a region of the ocean where there are high concentrations of calcite, a mineral form of calcium carbonate. The belt extends over a large area of the Southern Ocean surrounding Antarctica. The calcite in the Great Calcite Belt is formed by tiny marine organisms called coccolithophores, which build their shells out of calcium carbonate. When these organisms die, their shells sink to the bottom of the ocean, and over time, they accumulate to form a thick layer of calcite sediment.

The Great Calcite Belt occurs in areas of the Southern ocean where the calcite compensation depth (CCD) is relatively shallow, meaning that calcite minerals from the shells of marine organisms dissolve at a shallower depth in the water column. This results in a higher concentration of calcium carbonate sediments in the ocean floor, which can be observed in the form of white chalky sediments.

The Great Calcite Belt plays a significant role regulating the global carbon cycle. Calcite is a form of carbon that is removed from the atmosphere and stored in the ocean, which helps to reduce the amount of carbon dioxide in the atmosphere and mitigate the effects of climate change. Recent studies suggest the belt sequesters something between 15 and 30 million tonnes of carbon per year.

Scientists have further interest in the calcite sediments in the belt, which contain valuable information about past climate, ocean currents, ocean chemistry, and marine ecosystems. For example, variations in the CCD depth over time can indicate changes in the amount of carbon dioxide in the atmosphere and the ocean's ability to absorb it. The belt is also home to a diverse range of contemporary marine life, including deep-sea corals and fish that are adapted to the unique conditions found in this part of the ocean. The Great Calcite Belt is a region of elevated summertime upper ocean calcite concentration derived from coccolithophores, despite the region being known for its diatom predominance. The overlap of two major phytoplankton groups, coccolithophores and diatoms, in the dynamic frontal systems characteristic of this region provides an ideal setting to study environmental influences on the distribution of different species within these taxonomic groups.

== Overview ==
The Great Calcite Belt can be defined as an elevated particulate inorganic carbon (PIC) feature occurring alongside seasonally elevated chlorophyll a in austral spring and summer in the Southern Ocean. It plays an important role in climate fluctuations, accounting for over 60% of the Southern Ocean area (30–60° S). The region between 30° and 50° S has the highest uptake of anthropogenic carbon dioxide (CO_{2}) alongside the North Atlantic and North Pacific oceans. Knowledge of the impact of interacting environmental influences on phytoplankton distribution in the Southern Ocean is limited. For example, more understanding is needed of how light and iron availability or temperature and pH interact to control phytoplankton biogeography. Hence, if model parameterizations are to improve to provide accurate predictions of biogeochemical change, a multivariate understanding of the full suite of environmental drivers is required.

The Southern Ocean has often been considered as a microplankton-dominated (20–200 μm) system with phytoplankton blooms dominated by large diatoms and Phaeocystis sp. However, since the identification of the Great Calcite Belt (GCB) as a consistent feature and the recognition of picoplankton (< 2 μm) and nanoplankton (2–20 μm) importance in high-nutrient, low-chlorophyll (HNLC) waters, the dynamics of small (bio)mineralizing plankton and their export need to be acknowledged. The two dominant biomineralizing phytoplankton groups in the GCB are coccolithophores and diatoms. Coccolithophores are generally found north of the polar front, though Emiliania huxleyi has been observed as far south as 58° S in the Scotia Sea, at 61° S across Drake Passage, and at 65°S south of Australia.

Diatoms are present throughout the GCB, with the polar front marking a strong divide between different size fractions. North of the polar front, small diatom species, such as Pseudo-nitzschia spp. and Thalassiosira spp., tend to dominate numerically, whereas large diatoms with higher silicic acid requirements (e.g., Fragilariopsis kerguelensis) are generally more abundant south of the polar front. High abundances of nanoplankton (coccolithophores, small diatoms, chrysophytes) have also been observed on the Patagonian Shelf and in the Scotia Sea. Currently, few studies incorporate small biomineralizing phytoplankton to species level. Rather, the focus has often been on the larger and noncalcifying species in the Southern Ocean due to sample preservation issues (i.e., acidified Lugol’s solution dissolves calcite, and light microscopy restricts accurate identification to cells > 10 μm. In the context of climate change and future ecosystem function, the distribution of biomineralizing phytoplankton is important to define when considering phytoplankton interactions with carbonate chemistry, and ocean biogeochemistry.

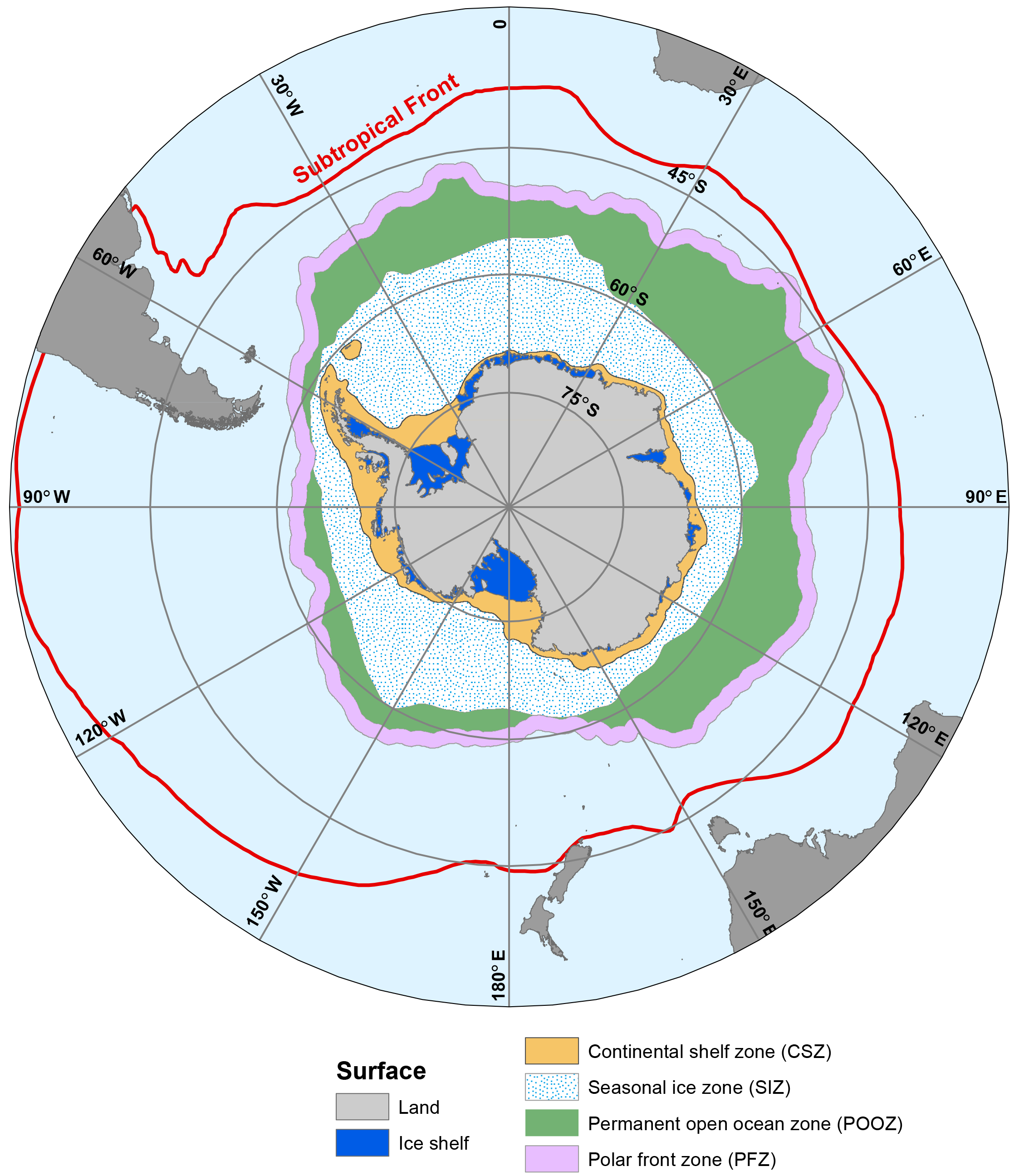
Ecological zones of the Southern Ocean

The Great Calcite Belt spans the major Southern Ocean circumpolar fronts: the Subantarctic front, the polar front, the Southern Antarctic Circumpolar Current front, and occasionally the southern boundary of the Antarctic Circumpolar Current. The subtropical front (at approximately 10 °C) acts as the northern boundary of the GCB and is associated with a sharp increase in PIC southwards. These fronts divide distinct environmental and biogeochemical zones, making the GCB an ideal study area to examine controls on phytoplankton communities in the open ocean. A high PIC concentration observed in the GCB (1 μmol PIC L^{−1}) compared to the global average (0.2 μmol PIC L^{−1}) and significant quantities of detached E. huxleyi coccoliths (in concentrations > 20,000 coccoliths mL^{−1}) both characterize the GCB. The GCB is clearly observed in satellite imagery spanning from the Patagonian Shelf across the Atlantic, Indian, and Pacific oceans and completing Antarctic circumnavigation via the Drake Passage.

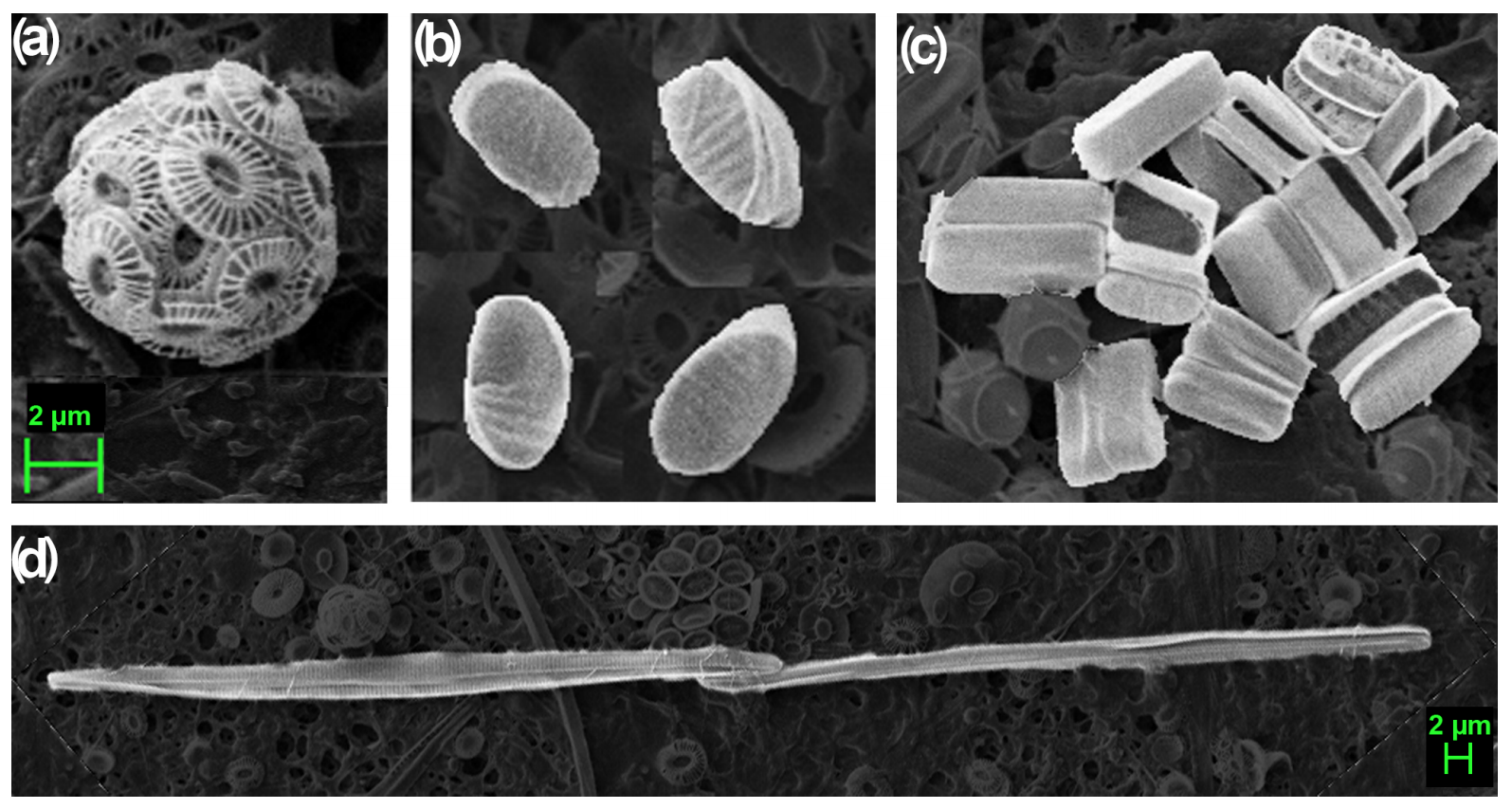
Four phytoplankton species identified as characterizing the significantly different community structures along the Great Calcite Belt: (a) Emiliania huxleyi, (b) Fragilariopsis pseudonana, (c) Fragilariopsis nana, and (d) Pseudo-nitzschia spp.

== Coccolithophores versus the diatom ==
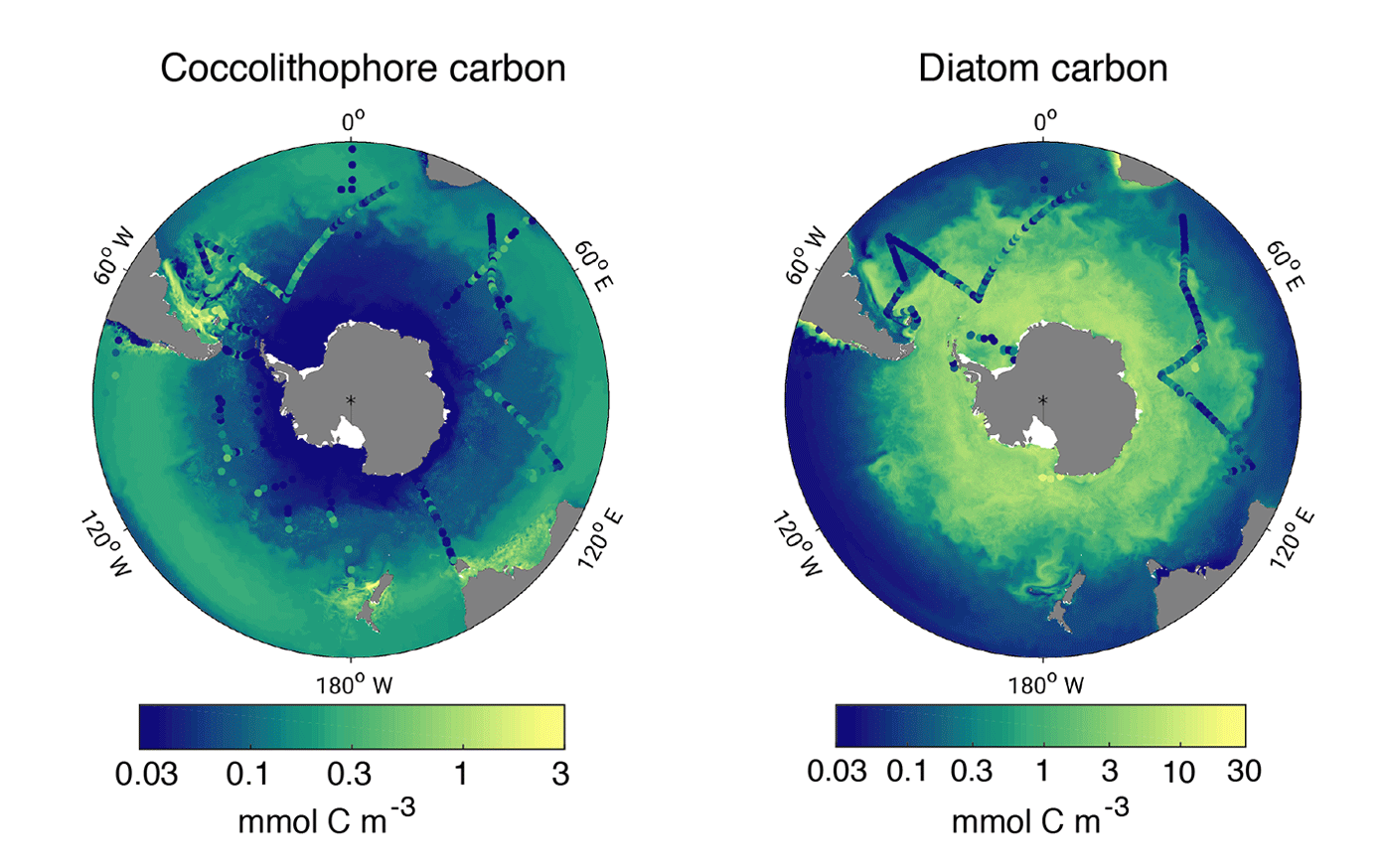
Coccolithophores and diatoms in the Southern Ocean. Biomass distributions for the four months from December to March. Mean top 50 metres of coccolithophore (left) and diatom (right) carbon biomass (mmol/m^{3}) using a regional high-resolution model for the Southern Ocean. Coccolithophore and diatom biomass observations from the top 50 metres are indicated by coloured dots. (Note difference in scales.)

The biogeography of Southern Ocean phytoplankton controls the local biogeochemistry and the export of macronutrients to lower latitudes and depth. Of particular relevance is the competitive interaction between coccolithophores and diatoms, with the former being prevalent along the Great Calcite Belt (40–60°S), while diatoms tend to dominate the regions south of 60°S, as illustrated in the diagram on the right.

The ocean is changing at an unprecedented rate as a consequence of increasing anthropogenic CO_{2} emissions and related climate change. Changes in density stratification and nutrient supply, as well as ocean acidification, lead to changes in phytoplankton community composition and consequently ecosystem structure and function. Some of these changes are already observable today and may have cascading effects on global biogeochemical cycles and oceanic carbon uptake. Changes in Southern Ocean (SO) biogeography are especially critical due to the importance of the Southern Ocean in fuelling primary production at lower latitudes through the lateral export of nutrients and in taking up anthropogenic CO_{2}. For the carbon cycle, the ratio of calcifying and noncalcifying phytoplankton is crucial due to the counteracting effects of calcification and photosynthesis on seawater pCO_{2}, which ultimately controls CO_{2} exchange with the atmosphere, and the differing ballasting effect of calcite and silicic acid shells for organic carbon export.

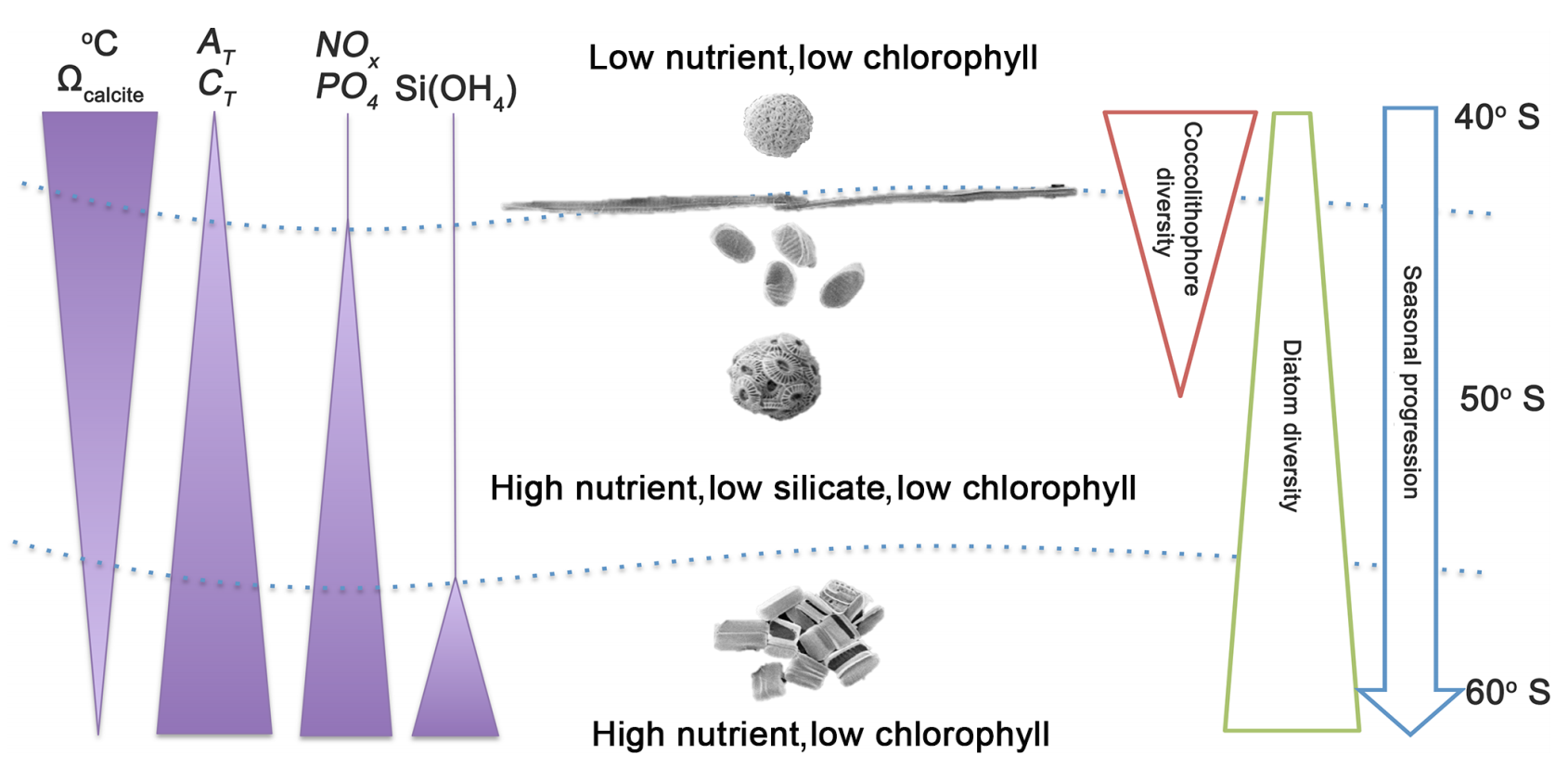
Potential seasonal progression occurring in the Great Calcite Belt, allowing coccolithophores to develop after the main diatom bloom. Note phytoplankton images are not to scale.

Calcifying coccolithophores and silicifying diatoms are globally ubiquitous phytoplankton functional groups. Diatoms are a major contributor to global phytoplankton biomass and annual net primary production. In comparison, coccolithophores contribute less to biomass and to global NPP.

However, coccolithophores are the major phytoplanktonic calcifier. thereby significantly impacting the global carbon cycle. Diatoms dominate the phytoplankton community in the Southern Ocean, but coccolithophores have received increasing attention in recent years. Satellite imagery of particulate inorganic carbon (PIC, a proxy for coccolithophore abundance) revealed the "Great Calcite Belt", an annually reoccurring circumpolar band of elevated PIC concentrations between 40 and 60°S. In situ observations confirmed coccolithophore abundances of up to 2.4×10^{3} cells mL^{−1} in the Atlantic sector (blooms on the Patagonian Shelf), up to 3.8×10^{2} cells mL^{−1} in the Indian sector, and up to 5.4×10^{2} cells mL^{−1} in the Pacific sector of the Southern Ocean with Emiliania huxleyi being the dominant species. However, the contribution of coccolithophores to total Southern Ocean phytoplankton biomass and NPP has not yet been assessed. Locally, elevated coccolithophore abundance in the GCB has been found to turn surface waters into a source of CO_{2} for the atmosphere, emphasising the necessity to understand the controls on their abundance in the Southern Ocean in the context of the carbon cycle and climate change. While coccolithophores have been observed to have moved polewards in recent decades, their response to the combined effects of future warming and ocean acidification is still subject to debate. As their response will also crucially depend on future phytoplankton community composition and predator–prey interactions, it is essential to assess the controls on their abundance in today's climate.

== Top-down and bottom-up approaches ==
Coccolithophore biomass is controlled by a combination of bottom-up (physical–biogeochemical environment) and top-down factors (predator–prey interactions), but the relative importance of the two has not yet been assessed for coccolithophores in the Southern Ocean. Bottom-up factors directly impact phytoplankton growth, and diatoms and coccolithophores are traditionally discriminated based on their differing requirements for nutrients, turbulence, and light. Based on this, Margalef's mandala predicts a seasonal succession from diatoms to coccolithophores as light levels increase and nutrient levels decline. In situ studies assessing Southern Ocean coccolithophore biogeography have found coccolithophores under various environmental conditions, thus suggesting a wide ecological niche, but all of the mentioned studies have almost exclusively focused on bottom-up controls.

However, phytoplankton growth rates do not necessarily covary with biomass accumulation rates. Using satellite data from the North Atlantic, Behrenfeld stressed in 2014 the importance of simultaneously considering bottom-up and top-down factors when assessing seasonal phytoplankton biomass dynamics and the succession of different phytoplankton types owing to the spatially and temporally varying relative importance of the physical–biogeochemical and the biological environment.

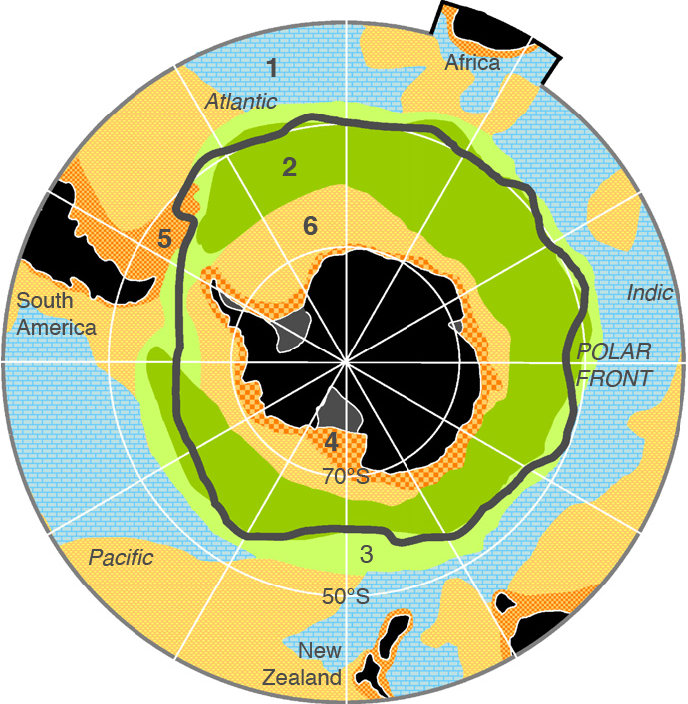
Types of marine sediments in the Southern Ocean: (1) calcareous ooze/mud, (2, 3) biosiliceous/mud, (4) coarse lithogenic sediments, (5, 6) lithogenic sand/mud

In the Southern Ocean, previous studies have shown zooplankton grazing to control total phytoplankton biomass, phytoplankton community composition, and ecosystem structure, suggesting that top-down control might also be an important driver for the relative abundance of coccolithophores and diatoms. But the role of zooplankton grazing in current Earth system models is not well considered, and the impact of different grazing formulations on phytoplankton biogeography and diversity is subject to ongoing research.

The diagram on the left shows the spatial distribution of different types of marine sediments in the Southern Ocean. The greenish area south of the Polar Front shows the extension of the subpolar opal belt where sediments have a significant portion of silicous plankton frustules. Sediments near Antarctica mainly consist of glacial debris in any grain size eroded and delivered by the Antarctic Ice.

== See also ==
- Great Atlantic Sargassum Belt
- Milky seas effect
