= Particulate inorganic carbon =

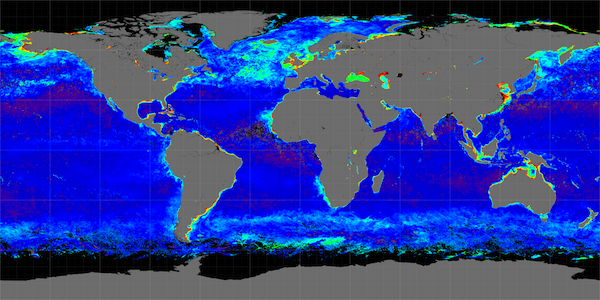
Satellite imagery of particulate inorganic carbon (PIC) – NASA 2014

Particulate inorganic carbon (PIC) can be contrasted with dissolved inorganic carbon (DIC), the other form of inorganic carbon found in the ocean. These distinctions are important in chemical oceanography. Particulate inorganic carbon is sometimes called suspended inorganic carbon. In operational terms, it is defined as the inorganic carbon in particulate form that is too large to pass through the filter used to separate dissolved inorganic carbon.

Most PIC is calcium carbonate, CaCO_{3}, particularly in the form of calcite, but also in the form of aragonite. Calcium carbonate makes up the shells of many marine organisms. It also forms during whiting events and is excreted by marine fish during osmoregulation.

== Overview ==
Carbon compounds can be distinguished as either organic or inorganic, and dissolved or particulate, depending on their composition. Organic carbon forms the backbone of key component of organic compounds such as – proteins, lipids, carbohydrates, and nucleic acids. Inorganic carbon is found primarily in simple compounds such as carbon dioxide, carbonic acid, bicarbonate, and carbonate (CO_{2}, H_{2}CO_{3}, HCO_{3}^{−}, CO_{3}^{2−} respectively).

Marine carbon is further separated into particulate and dissolved phases. These pools are operationally defined by physical separation – dissolved carbon passes through a 0.2 μm filter, and particulate carbon does not.

There are two main types of inorganic carbon that are found in the oceans. Dissolved inorganic carbon (DIC) is made up of bicarbonate (HCO_{3}^{−}), carbonate (CO_{3}^{2−}) and carbon dioxide (including both dissolved CO_{2} and carbonic acid H_{2}CO_{3}). DIC can be converted to particulate inorganic carbon (PIC) through precipitation of CaCO_{3} (biologically or abiotically). DIC can also be converted to particulate organic carbon (POC) through photosynthesis and chemoautotrophy (i.e. primary production). DIC increases with depth as organic carbon particles sink and are respired. Free oxygen decreases as DIC increases because oxygen is consumed during aerobic respiration.

Particulate inorganic carbon (PIC) is the other form of inorganic carbon found in the ocean. Most PIC is the CaCO_{3} that makes up shells of various marine organisms, but can also form in whiting events. Marine fish also excrete calcium carbonate during osmoregulation.

Some of the inorganic carbon species in the ocean, such as bicarbonate and carbonate, are major contributors to alkalinity, a natural ocean buffer that prevents drastic changes in acidity (or pH). The marine carbon cycle also affects the reaction and dissolution rates of some chemical compounds, regulates the amount of carbon dioxide in the atmosphere and Earth's temperature.

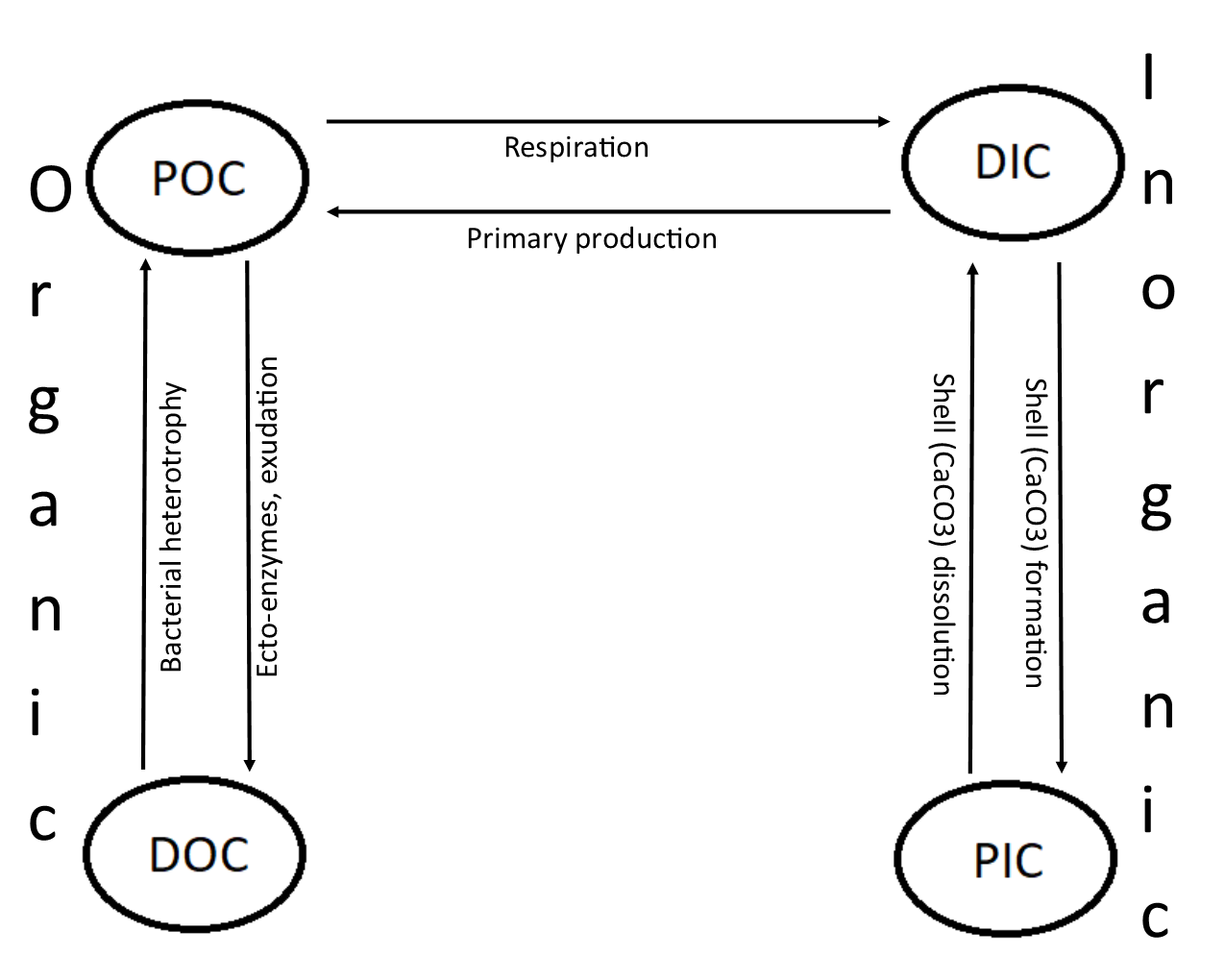
Carbon is separated into four distinct pools based on whether it is organic/inorganic and whether it is dissolved/particulate. The processes associated with each arrow describe the transformation associated with the transfer of carbon from one reservoir to another.

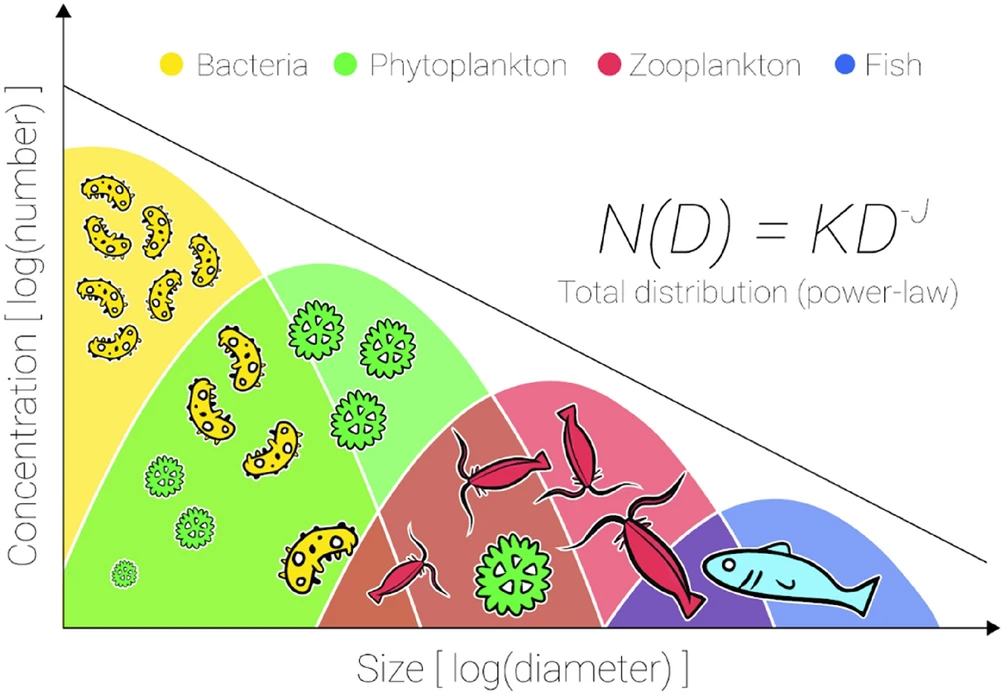
Natural particle size distributions in the ocean Natural particle size distributions in the ocean broadly follow a power law over many orders of magnitude, from viruses and bacteria to fish and whales. Non-living material contained in the particle size distribution may also include marine snow, detritus, sediment and microplastic. The power law particle size distribution is the sum of log-normal distributions for each sub-population, four examples of which are illustrated in this figure. N is the number of particles of diameter, D; K is the number of 1 μm particles per volume; J is the slope of the power-law distribution.

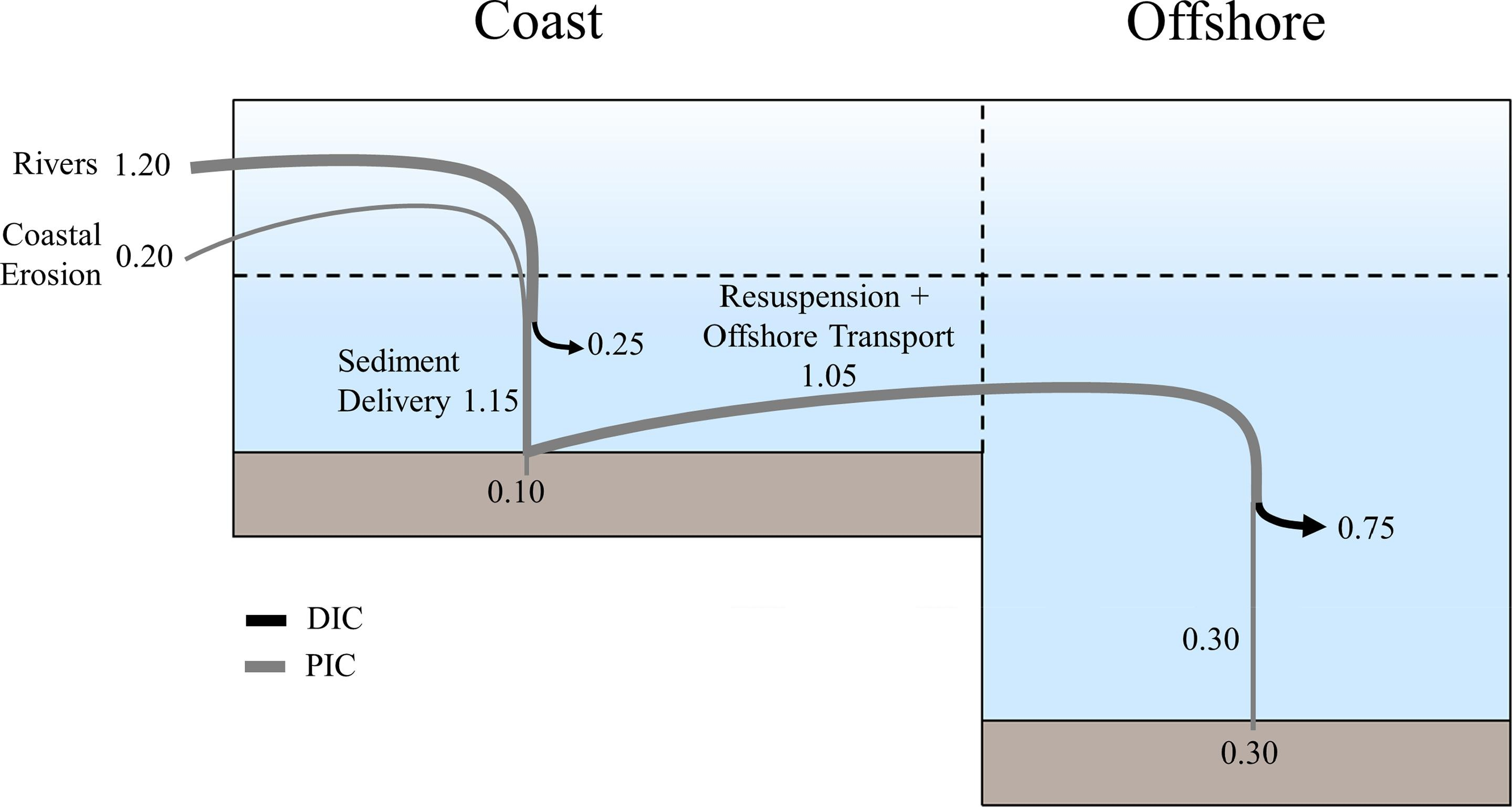
Particulate inorganic carbon budget for Hudson Bay Black arrows represent DIC produced by PIC dissolution. Grey lines represent terrestrial PIC. Units are Tg C y^{−1}

== Calcium carbonate ==
Particulate inorganic carbon (PIC) usually takes the form of calcium carbonate (CaCO_{3}), and plays a key part in the ocean carbon cycle. This biologically fixed carbon is used as a protective coating for many planktonic species (coccolithophores, foraminifera) as well as larger marine organisms (mollusk shells). Calcium carbonate is also excreted at high rates during osmoregulation by fish, and can form in whiting events. While this form of carbon is not directly taken from the atmospheric budget, it is formed from dissolved forms of carbonate which are in equilibrium with CO_{2} and then responsible for removing this carbon via sequestration.

CO_{2} + H_{2}O → H_{2}CO_{3} → H^{+} + HCO_{3}^{−}

Ca^{2+} + 2HCO_{3}^{−} → CaCO_{3} + CO_{2} + H_{2}O

While this process does manage to fix a large amount of carbon, two units of alkalinity are sequestered for every unit of sequestered carbon. The formation and sinking of CaCO_{3} therefore drives a surface to deep alkalinity gradient which serves to raise the pH of surface waters, shifting the speciation of dissolved carbon to raise the partial pressure of dissolved CO_{2} in surface waters, which actually raises atmospheric levels. In addition, the burial of CaCO_{3} in sediments serves to lower overall oceanic alkalinity, tending to raise pH and thereby atmospheric CO_{2} levels if not counterbalanced by the new input of alkalinity from weathering. The portion of carbon that is permanently buried at the sea floor becomes part of the geologic record. Calcium carbonate often forms remarkable deposits that can then be raised onto land through tectonic motion as in the case with the White Cliffs of Dover in Southern England. These cliffs are made almost entirely of the plates of buried coccolithophores.

=== Carbonate pump ===
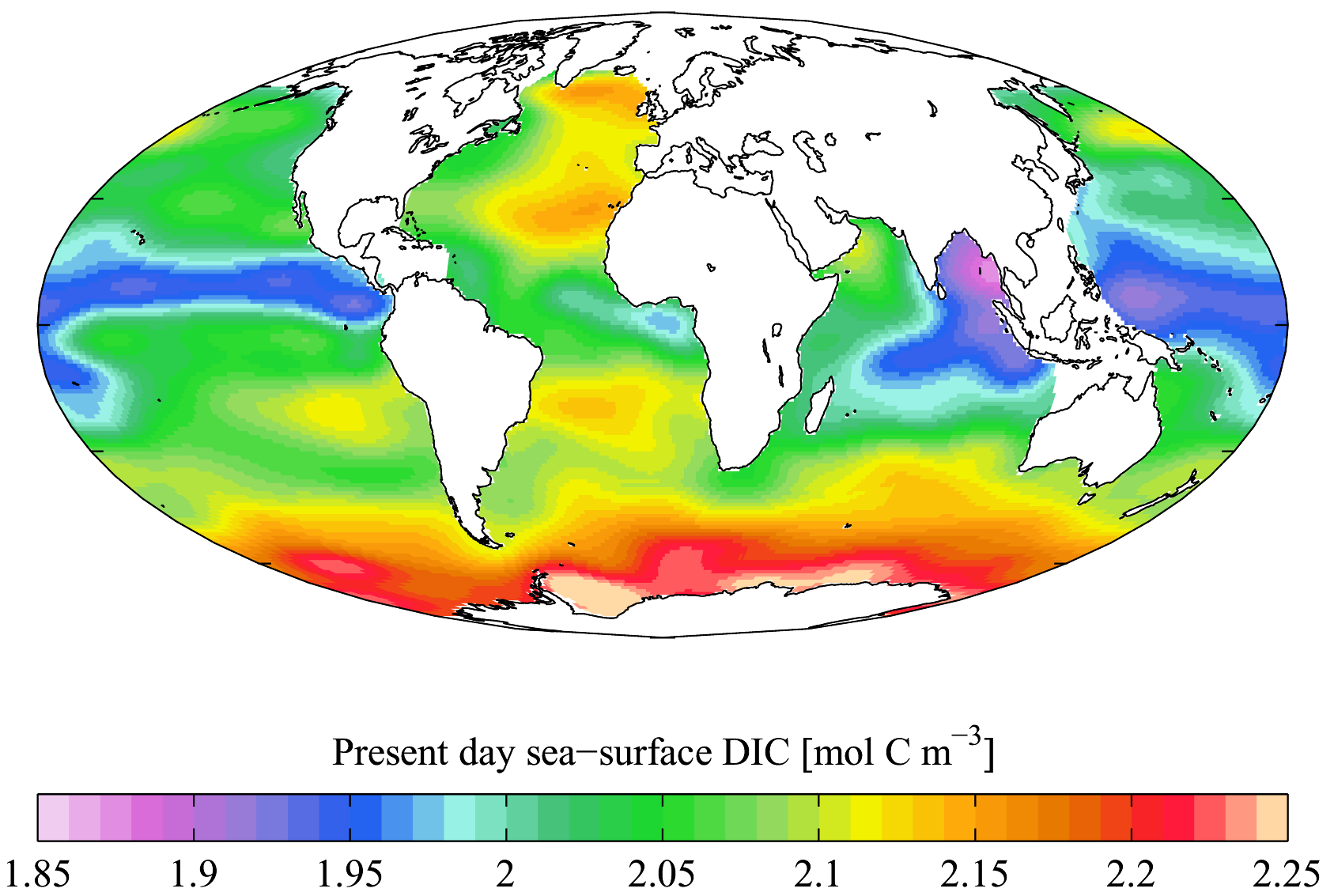
Sea surface dissolved inorganic carbon

The carbonate pump, sometimes called the carbonate counter pump, starts with marine organisms at the ocean's surface producing particulate inorganic carbon (PIC) in the form of calcium carbonate (calcite or aragonite, CaCO_{3}). This CaCO_{3} is what forms hard body parts like shells. The formation of these shells increases atmospheric CO_{2} due to the production of CaCO_{3} in the following reaction with simplified stoichiometry:

| Ca^{+}_{2} + 2 HCO^{−}_{3} ⇌ CaCO_{3} + CO_{2} + H_{2}O | 4 |

Coccolithophores, a nearly ubiquitous group of phytoplankton that produce shells of calcium carbonate, are the dominant contributors to the carbonate pump. Due to their abundance, coccolithophores have significant implications on carbonate chemistry, in the surface waters they inhabit and in the ocean below: they provide a large mechanism for the downward transport of CaCO_{3}. The air-sea CO_{2} flux induced by a marine biological community can be determined by the rain ratio - the proportion of carbon from calcium carbonate compared to that from organic carbon in particulate matter sinking to the ocean floor, (PIC/POC). The carbonate pump acts as a negative feedback on CO_{2} taken into the ocean by the solubility pump. It occurs with lesser magnitude than the solubility pump.

The carbonate pump is sometimes referred to as the "hard tissue" component of the biological pump. Some surface marine organisms, like coccolithophores, produce hard structures out of calcium carbonate, a form of particulate inorganic carbon, by fixing bicarbonate. This fixation of DIC is an important part of the oceanic carbon cycle.

Ca^{2+} + 2 HCO_{3}^{−} → CaCO_{3} + CO_{2} + H_{2}O

While the biological carbon pump fixes inorganic carbon (CO_{2}) into particulate organic carbon in the form of sugar (C_{6}H_{12}O_{6}), the carbonate pump fixes inorganic bicarbonate and causes a net release of CO_{2}. In this way, the carbonate pump could be termed the carbonate counter pump. It works counter to the biological pump by counteracting the CO_{2} flux from the biological pump.

== Calcite and aragonite seas ==
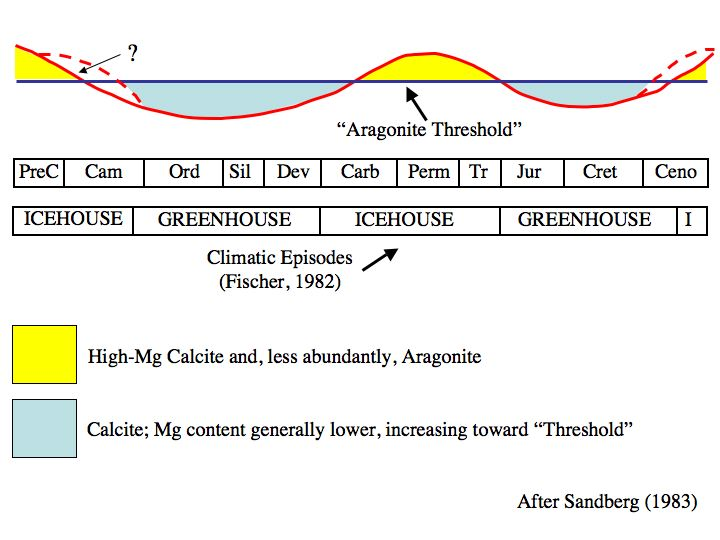
The alternation of calcite and aragonite seas through geologic time

An aragonite sea contains aragonite and high-magnesium calcite as the primary inorganic calcium carbonate precipitates. The chemical conditions of the seawater must be notably high in magnesium content relative to calcium (high Mg/Ca ratio) for an aragonite sea to form. This is in contrast to a calcite sea in which seawater low in magnesium content relative to calcium (low Mg/Ca ratio) favors the formation of low-magnesium calcite as the primary inorganic marine calcium carbonate precipitate.

The Early Paleozoic and the Middle to Late Mesozoic oceans were predominantly calcite seas, whereas the Middle Paleozoic through the Early Mesozoic and the Cenozoic (including today) are characterized by aragonite seas.

Aragonite seas occur due to several factors, the most obvious of these is a high seawater Mg/Ca ratio (Mg/Ca > 2), which occurs during intervals of slow seafloor spreading. However, the sea level, temperature, and calcium carbonate saturation state of the surrounding system also determine which polymorph of calcium carbonate (aragonite, low-magnesium calcite, high-magnesium calcite) will form.

Likewise, the occurrence of calcite seas is controlled by the same suite of factors controlling aragonite seas, with the most obvious being a low seawater Mg/Ca ratio (Mg/Ca < 2), which occurs during intervals of rapid seafloor spreading.

== Whiting events ==
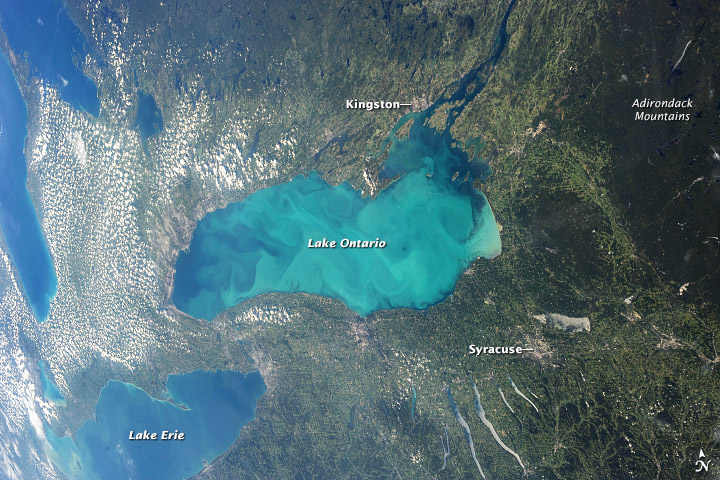
Aerial view of a whiting event precipitation cloud in Lake Ontario

A whiting event is a phenomenon that occurs when a suspended cloud of fine-grained calcium carbonate precipitates in water bodies, typically during summer months, as a result of photosynthetic microbiological activity or sediment disturbance. The phenomenon gets its name from the white, chalky color it imbues to the water. These events have been shown to occur in temperate waters as well as tropical ones, and they can span for hundreds of meters. They can also occur in both marine and freshwater environments. The origin of whiting events is debated among the scientific community, and it is unclear if there is a single, specific cause. Generally, they are thought to result from either bottom sediment re-suspension or by increased activity of certain microscopic life such as phytoplankton. Because whiting events affect aquatic chemistry, physical properties, and carbon cycling, studying the mechanisms behind them holds scientific relevance in various ways.

== Great Calcite Belt ==
Yearly cycle of the Great Calcite Belt in the Southern Ocean

The Great Calcite Belt (GCB) of the Southern Ocean is a region of elevated summertime upper ocean calcite concentration derived from coccolithophores, despite the region being known for its diatom predominance. The overlap of two major phytoplankton groups, coccolithophores and diatoms, in the dynamic frontal systems characteristic of this region provides an ideal setting to study environmental influences on the distribution of different species within these taxonomic groups.

The Great Calcite Belt, defined as an elevated particulate inorganic carbon (PIC) feature occurring alongside seasonally elevated chlorophyll a in austral spring and summer in the Southern Ocean, plays an important role in climate fluctuations, accounting for over 60% of the Southern Ocean area (30–60° S). The region between 30° and 50° S has the highest uptake of anthropogenic carbon dioxide (CO_{2}) alongside the North Atlantic and North Pacific oceans. Knowledge of the impact of interacting environmental influences on phytoplankton distribution in the Southern Ocean is limited. For example, more understanding is needed of how light and iron availability or temperature and pH interact to control phytoplankton biogeography. Hence, if model parameterizations are to improve to provide accurate predictions of biogeochemical change, a multivariate understanding of the full suite of environmental drivers is required.

The Southern Ocean has often been considered as a microplankton-dominated (20–200 μm) system with phytoplankton blooms dominated by large diatoms and Phaeocystis sp. However, since the identification of the GCB as a consistent feature and the recognition of picoplankton (< 2 μm) and nanoplankton (2–20 μm) importance in high-nutrient, low-chlorophyll (HNLC) waters, the dynamics of small (bio)mineralizing plankton and their export need to be acknowledged. The two dominant biomineralizing phytoplankton groups in the GCB are coccolithophores and diatoms. Coccolithophores are generally found north of the polar front, though Emiliania huxleyi has been observed as far south as 58° S in the Scotia Sea, at 61° S across Drake Passage, and at 65°S south of Australia.

Diatoms are present throughout the GCB, with the polar front marking a strong divide between different size fractions. North of the polar front, small diatom species, such as Pseudo-nitzschia spp. and Thalassiosira spp., tend to dominate numerically, whereas large diatoms with higher silicic acid requirements (e.g., Fragilariopsis kerguelensis) are generally more abundant south of the polar front. High abundances of nanoplankton (coccolithophores, small diatoms, chrysophytes) have also been observed on the Patagonian Shelf and in the Scotia Sea. Currently, few studies incorporate small biomineralizing phytoplankton to species level. Rather, the focus has often been on the larger and noncalcifying species in the Southern Ocean due to sample preservation issues (i.e., acidified Lugol's solution dissolves calcite, and light microscopy restricts accurate identification to cells > 10 μm. In the context of climate change and future ecosystem function, the distribution of biomineralizing phytoplankton is important to define when considering phytoplankton interactions with carbonate chemistry, and ocean biogeochemistry.

The Great Calcite Belt spans the major Southern Ocean circumpolar fronts: the Subantarctic front, the polar front, the Southern Antarctic Circumpolar Current front, and occasionally the southern boundary of the Antarctic Circumpolar Current. The subtropical front (at approximately 10 °C) acts as the northern boundary of the GCB and is associated with a sharp increase in PIC southwards. These fronts divide distinct environmental and biogeochemical zones, making the GCB an ideal study area to examine controls on phytoplankton communities in the open ocean. A high PIC concentration observed in the GCB (1 μmol PIC L^{−1}) compared to the global average (0.2 μmol PIC L^{−1}) and significant quantities of detached E. huxleyi coccoliths (in concentrations > 20,000 coccoliths mL^{−1}) both characterize the GCB. The GCB is clearly observed in satellite imagery spanning from the Patagonian Shelf across the Atlantic, Indian, and Pacific oceans and completing Antarctic circumnavigation via the Drake Passage.

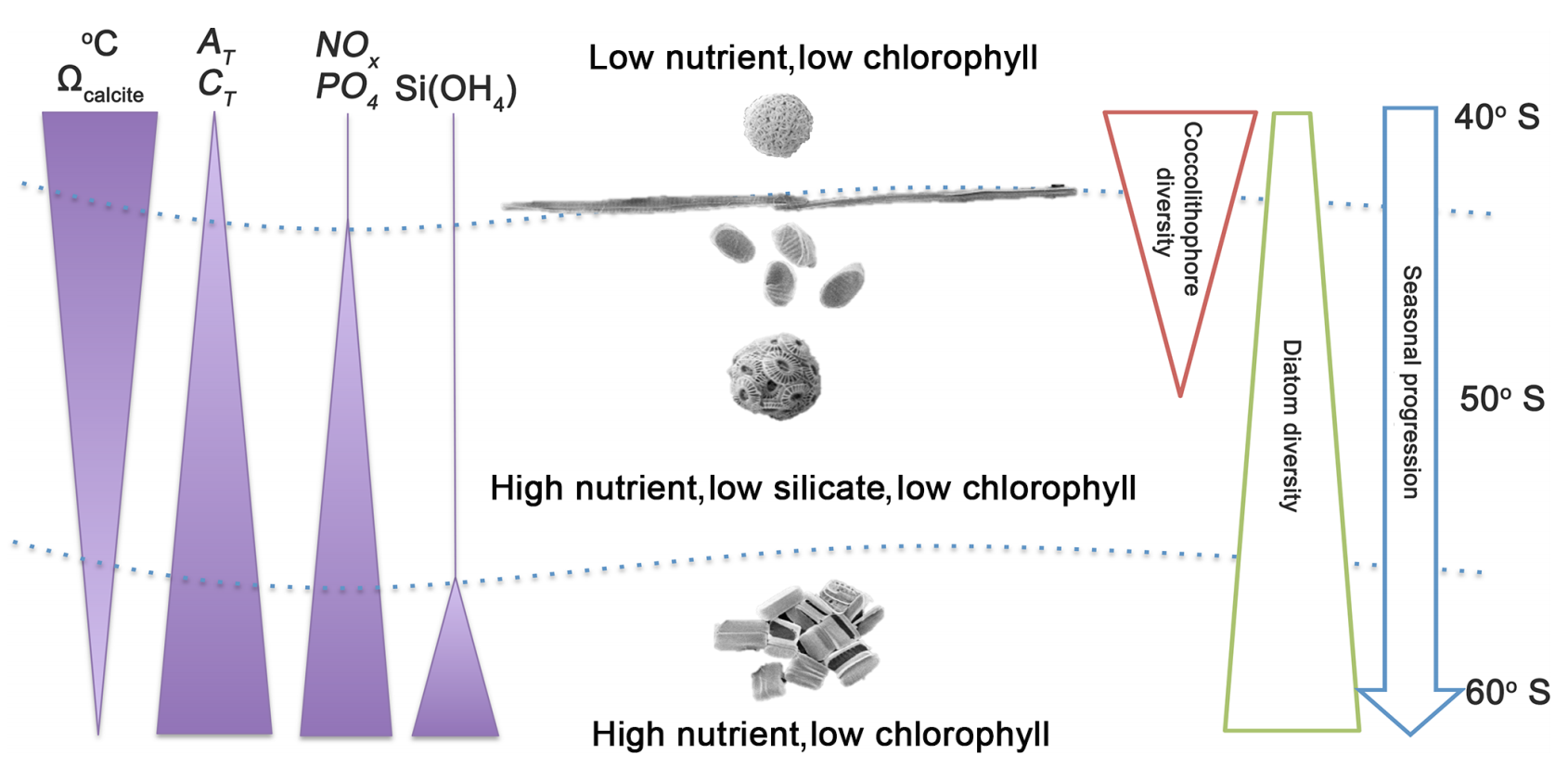
Potential seasonal progression occurring in the Great Calcite Belt, allowing coccolithophores to develop after the main diatom bloom. Note phytoplankton images are not to scale.

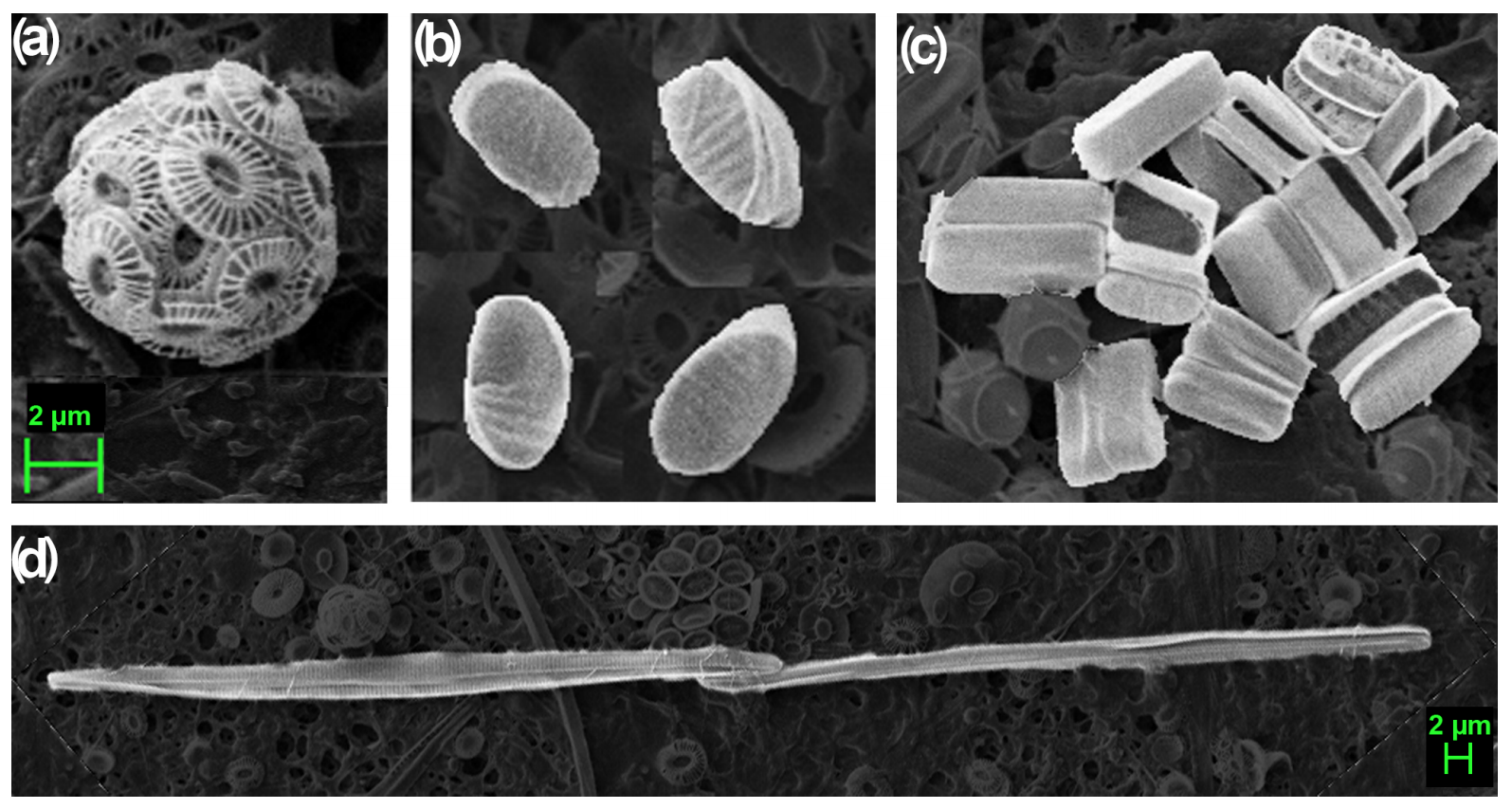
Four phytoplankton species identified as characterizing the significantly different community structures along the Great Calcite Belt: (a) Emiliania huxleyi, (b) Fragilariopsis pseudonana, (c) Fragilariopsis nana, and (d) Pseudo-nitzschia spp.

== Coccolithophores ==
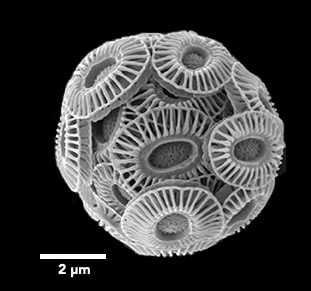
Emiliania huxleyi

Since the industrial revolution 30% of the anthropogenic CO_{2} has been absorbed by the oceans, resulting in ocean acidification, which is a threat to calcifying alga. As a result, there has been profound interest in these calcifying algae, boosted by their major role in the global carbon cycle. Globally, coccolithophores, particularly Emiliania huxleyi, are considered to be the most dominant calcifying algae, which blooms can even be seen from outer space. Calcifying algae create an exoskeleton from calcium carbonate platelets (coccoliths), providing ballast which enhances the organic and inorganic carbon flux to the deep sea. Organic carbon is formed by means of photosynthesis, where CO_{2} is fixed and converted into organic molecules, causing removal of CO_{2} from the seawater. Counterintuitively, the production of coccoliths leads to the release of CO_{2} in the seawater, due to removal of carbonate from the seawater, which reduces the alkalinity and causes acidification. Therefore, the ratio between particulate inorganic carbon (PIC) and particulate organic carbon (POC) is an important measure for the net release or uptake of CO_{2}. In short, the PIC:POC ratio is a key characteristic required to understand and predict the impact of climate change on the global ocean carbon cycle.

== Calcium particle morphologies ==
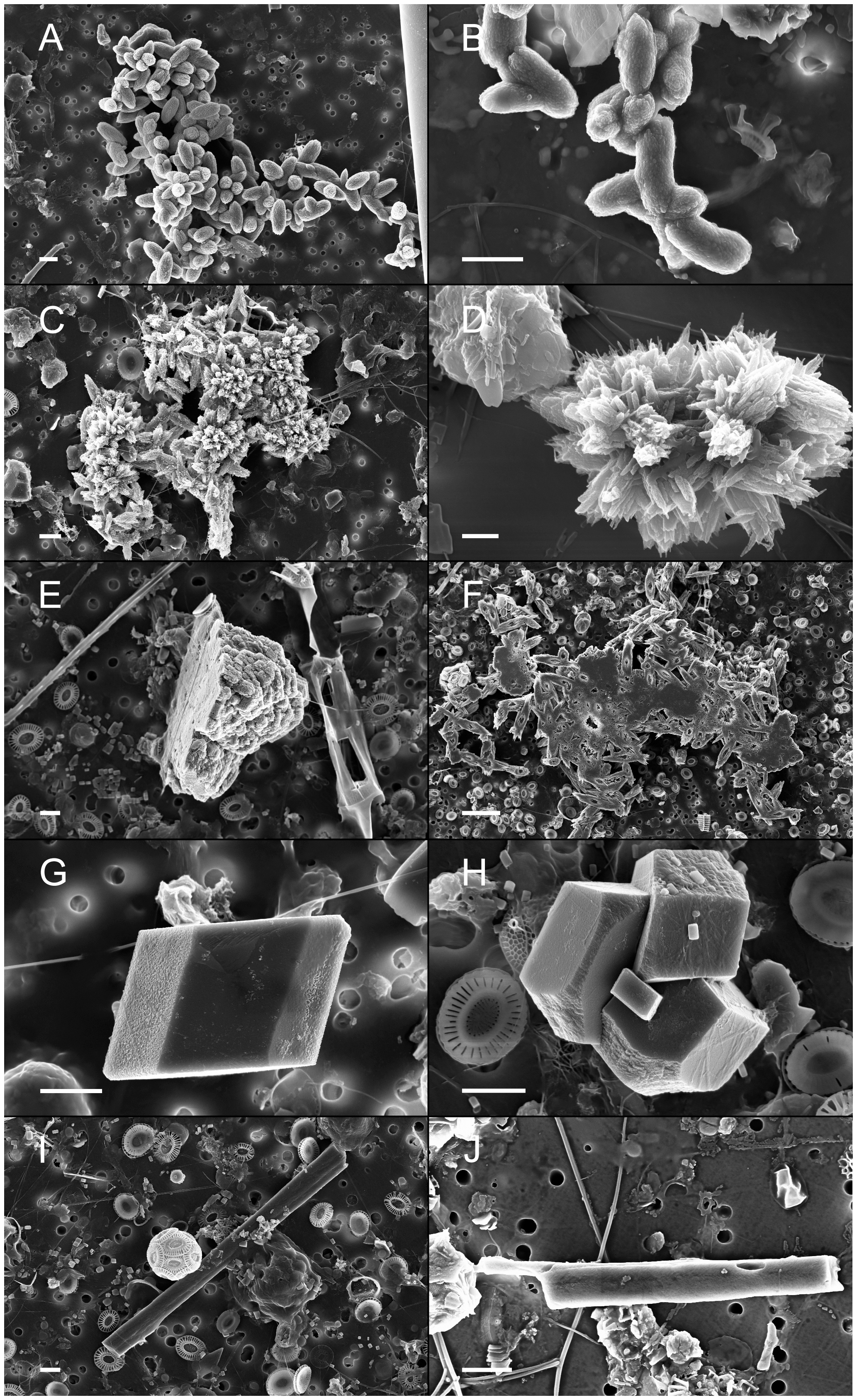
Scanning electron microscope images of marine calcium particles with different morphologies A) and B) Particles resembling bacteria and microcolonies of bacteria. B) and D) Particles similar to the Ca carbonates described to precipitate on the cell surface of cultured marine bacteria. E) and F) Particles with one flat surface suggesting that they are formed on a surface or interface. G and H) Particles with rhombohedral shape. I) and J) Baton like particles resembling Bahaman ooids. All scale bars are 2 μm except in d) where it is 1 μm and f) where it is 10 μm. Samples were collected at 5 m depth in Raunefjorden, a coastal sampling station south of Bergen, Norway.

Protist shells

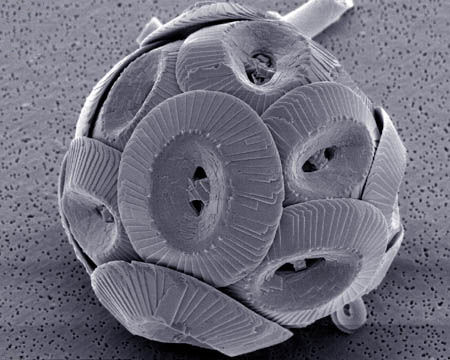
Coccolithus pelagicus

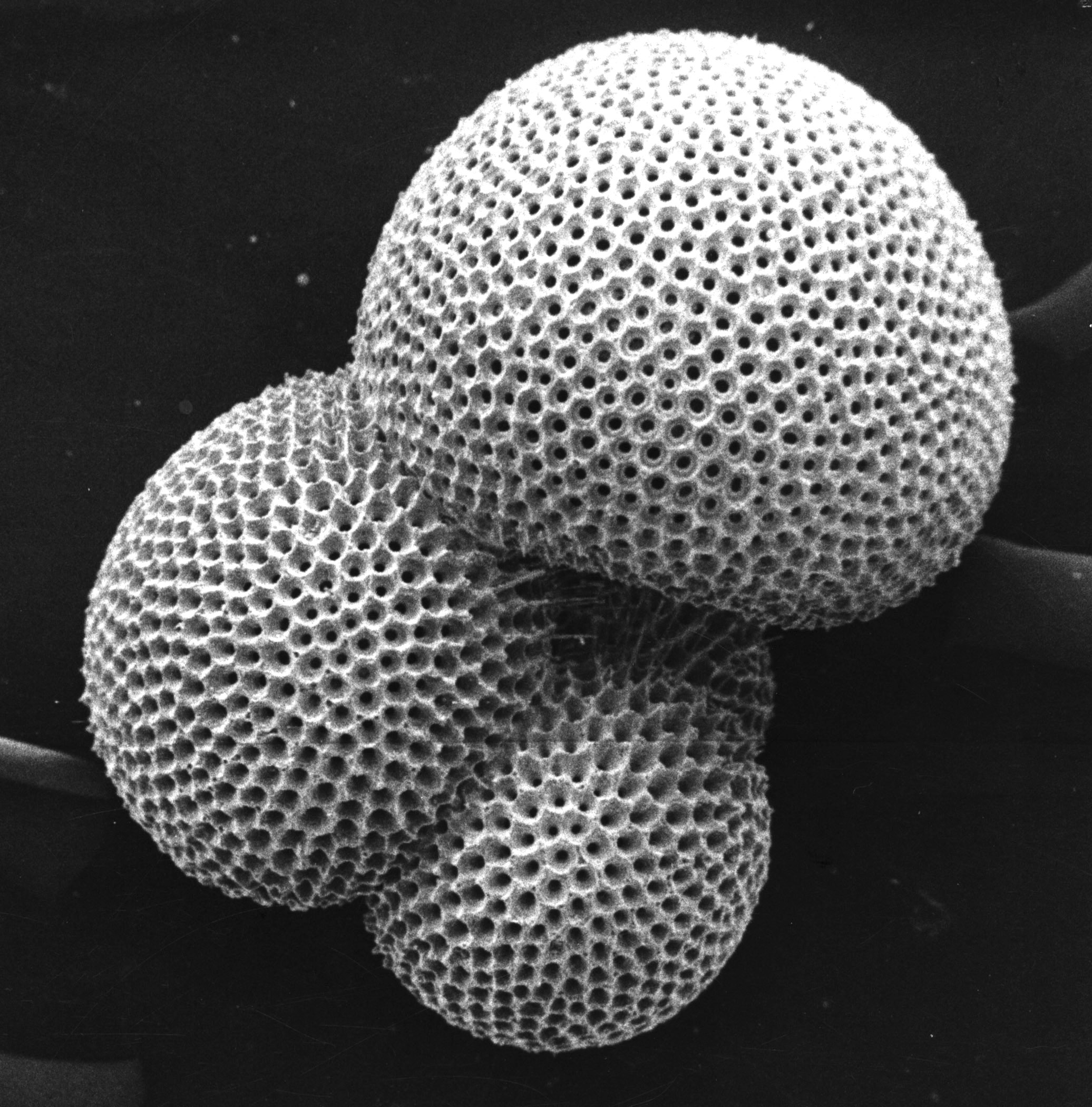
foraminiferan

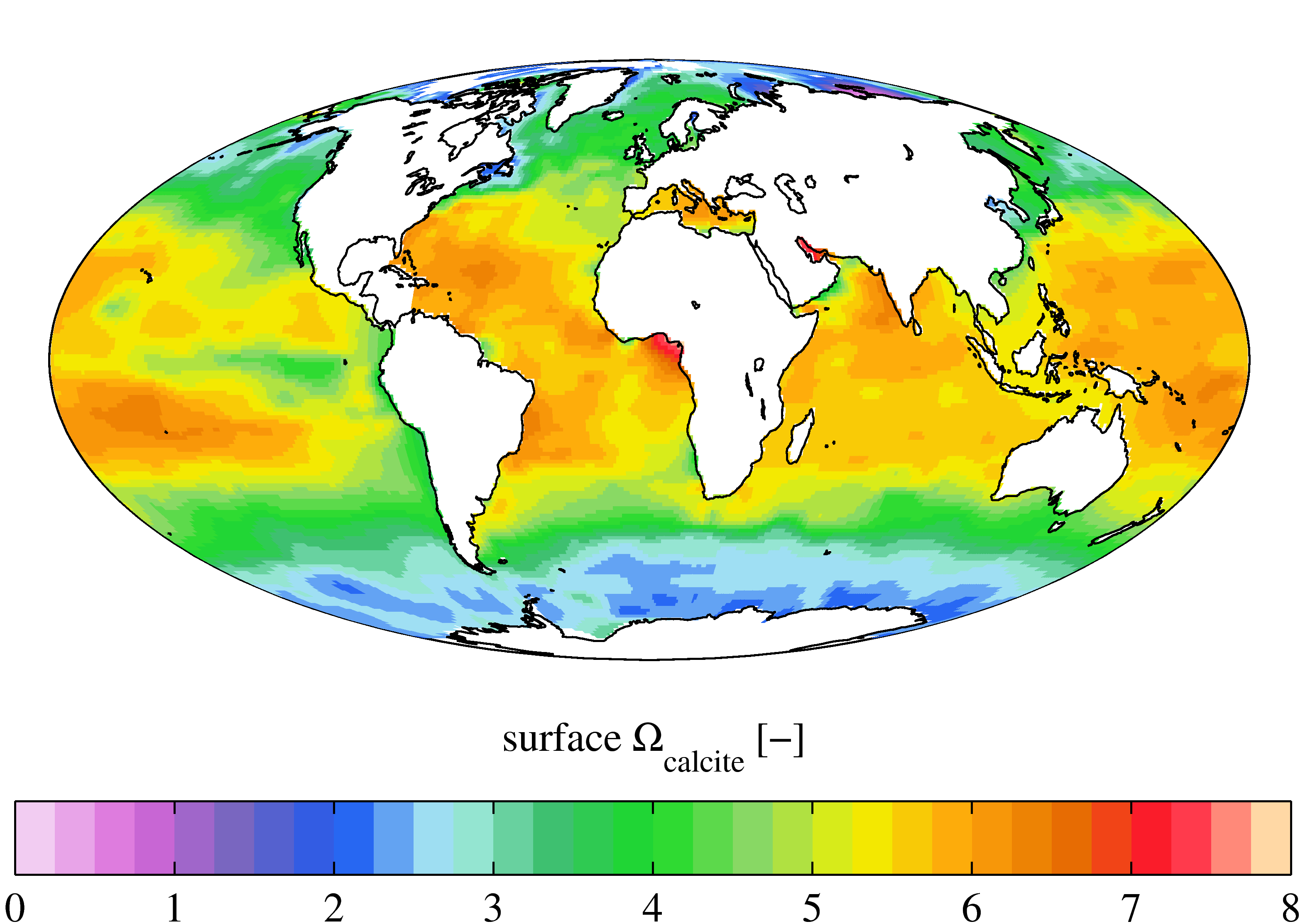
Present-day annual mean surface omega calcite: the normalised saturation state of calcite. Areas with a value less an 1 indicate a likeliness for dissolution (undersaturated) while a value over 1 indicates areas less likely for dissolution (oversaturation).

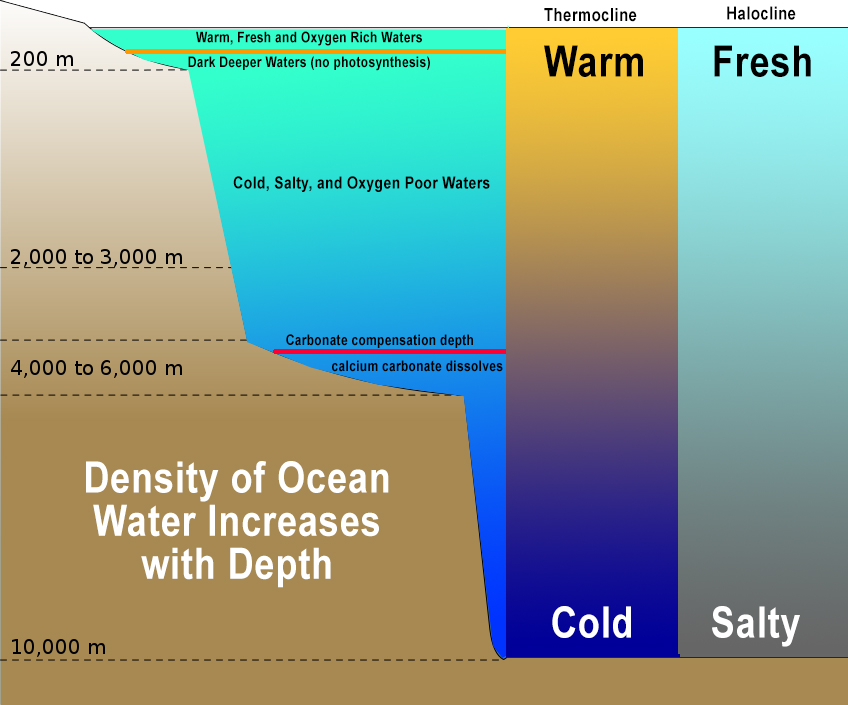
Stratified ocean waters showing the carbonate compensation depth and how the light, density, temperature and salinity gradients vary with water depth

== See also ==
- carbonate compensation depth
- aragonite compensation depth
- lysocline
- calcareous ooze
- Carbonate pump
- Marine biogenic calcification
- snowline: the depth at which carbonate disappear from sediments under steady-state conditions

== Sources ==
- Adabi, Mohammad H. (2004), "A re-evaluation of aragonite versus calcite seas", Carbonates and Evaporites, 19 (2): 133–141, Bibcode:2004CarEv..19..133A, doi:10.1007/BF03178476, S2CID 128955184
- Hardie, Lawrence A (1996), "Secular variation in seawater chemistry: An explanation for the coupled secular variation in the mineralogies of marine limestones and potash evaporites over the past 600 my", Geology, 24 (3), Geological Society of America: 279–283, Bibcode:1996Geo....24..279H, doi:10.1130/0091-7613(1996)024<0279:svisca>2.3.co;2
- Hardie, Lawrence A. (2003), "Secular variations in Precambrian seawater chemistry and the timing of Precambrian aragonite seas and calcite seas", Geology, 31 (9): 785–788, Bibcode:2003Geo....31..785H, doi:10.1130/g19657.1
- Lowenstein, T.K.; Timofeeff, M.N.; Brennan, S.T.; Hardie, L.A.; Demicco, R.V. (2001), "Oscillations in Phanerozoic seawater chemistry: evidence from fluid inclusions", Science, 294 (5544): 1086–1088, Bibcode:2001Sci...294.1086L, doi:10.1126/science.1064280, PMID 11691988, S2CID 2680231
- Morse, J.W.; Mackenzie, F.T. (1990). "Geochemistry of sedimentary carbonates". Developments in Sedimentology. 48: 1–707. doi:10.1016/S0070-4571(08)70330-3.
- Palmer, T.J.; Wilson, M.A. (2004). "Calcite precipitation and dissolution of biogenic aragonite in shallow Ordovician calcite seas". Lethaia. 37 (4): 417–427 . Bibcode:2004Letha..37..417P. doi:10.1080/00241160410002135.
- Wilkinson, B.H.; Given, K.R. (1986). "Secular variation in abiotic marine carbonates: constraints on Phanerozoic atmospheric carbon dioxide contents and oceanic Mg/Ca ratios". Journal of Geology. 94 (3): 321–333. Bibcode:1986JG.....94..321W. doi:10.1086/629032. S2CID 128840375.
- Wilkinson, B.H.; Owen, R.M.; Carroll, A.R. (1985). "Submarine hydrothermal weathering, global eustacy, and carbonate polymorphism in Phanerozoic marine oolites". Journal of Sedimentary Petrology. 55: 171–183. doi:10.1306/212f8657-2b24-11d7-8648000102c1865d.
