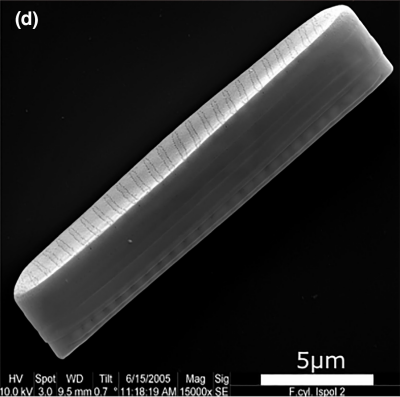
- Fragilariopsis cylindrus

Scientific classification
- Domain: Eukaryota
- Supergroup: Stramenopiles
- Division: Ochrophyta
- Clade: Bacillariophyta
- Class: Bacillariophyceae
- Order: Bacillariales
- Family: Bacillariaceae
- Genus: Fragilariopsis
- Species: F. cylindrus

Binomial name
- Fragilariopsis cylindrus (Grunow ex Cleve) Helmcke & Krieger 1954

Synonyms
- Fragilaria cylindrus Grunow ex Cleve 1883; Fragilaria nana Steemann-Nielsen 1935; Fragilariopsis cylindrus var. planctonica Willi Krieger 1954; Fragilariopsis cylindrus f. minor Manguin 1960; Fragilariopsis linearis var. intermedia Manguin 1960; Nitzschia cylindrus (Grunow ex Cleve) Hasle 1972

= Fragilariopsis cylindrus =

Species of single-celled organism

Fragilariopsis cylindrus is a sympagic (associated with sea ice) and/or planktonic bipolar pennate diatom that can form bloom in spring. This psychrophilic unicellular eukaryotic microalgae is an indicator of polar waters and the ecosystem associated with sea ice. It is a model organism to understanding the ecophysiological and fundamental mechanisms of cold-adapted life and also photosynthetic activity under extreme conditions.

== Description ==
Fragilariopsis cylindrus is a pennate raphid diatom with a retangular cell with an elongated apical valve ranging from 15 to 55 μ and a transapical axis ranging from 2.4 to 4 μm. Like other diatoms, F. cylindrus presents a cell wall composed of two biogenic silica valves, the frustule. It is also possible to note the presence of an eccentric raphe canal stretched by fibulae. The cell is generally presents two chloroplasts distributed at each pole of the cell surrounding the cell nucleus.

== Life style ==
Fragilariopsis cylindrus is cracterised by a predominantly chain-formed colonial lifestyle and builds large populations at the bottom of sea ice (sea-ice water interface), as well as in the sea-ice margin zone which includes open water. It is known for its success in growing at temperatures below 0 °C and has an optimum growth temperature of 4-5 °C, but cannot survive more than 9 °C. As a sympagic microalgae, F. cylindrus can cope with a high salinity environment, typically found in brine channels, by producing large amounts of polysaccharide-rich extracellular polymeric substances (EPS).

F. cylindrus is a phototropic organism, but is able to sustain essential metabolic processes in the dark, ensuring rapid recovery upon re-illumination, and allowing them to survive long-term darkness.
