= Subtropical (disambiguation) =

Term of Subtropical and Subtropics refer to:

- Subtropics
- Humid subtropical climate
- Subtropical ridge
- Subtropical High
- Subtropical cyclone
- Subtropical front
- Subtropical jet
- Subtropics (journal)
