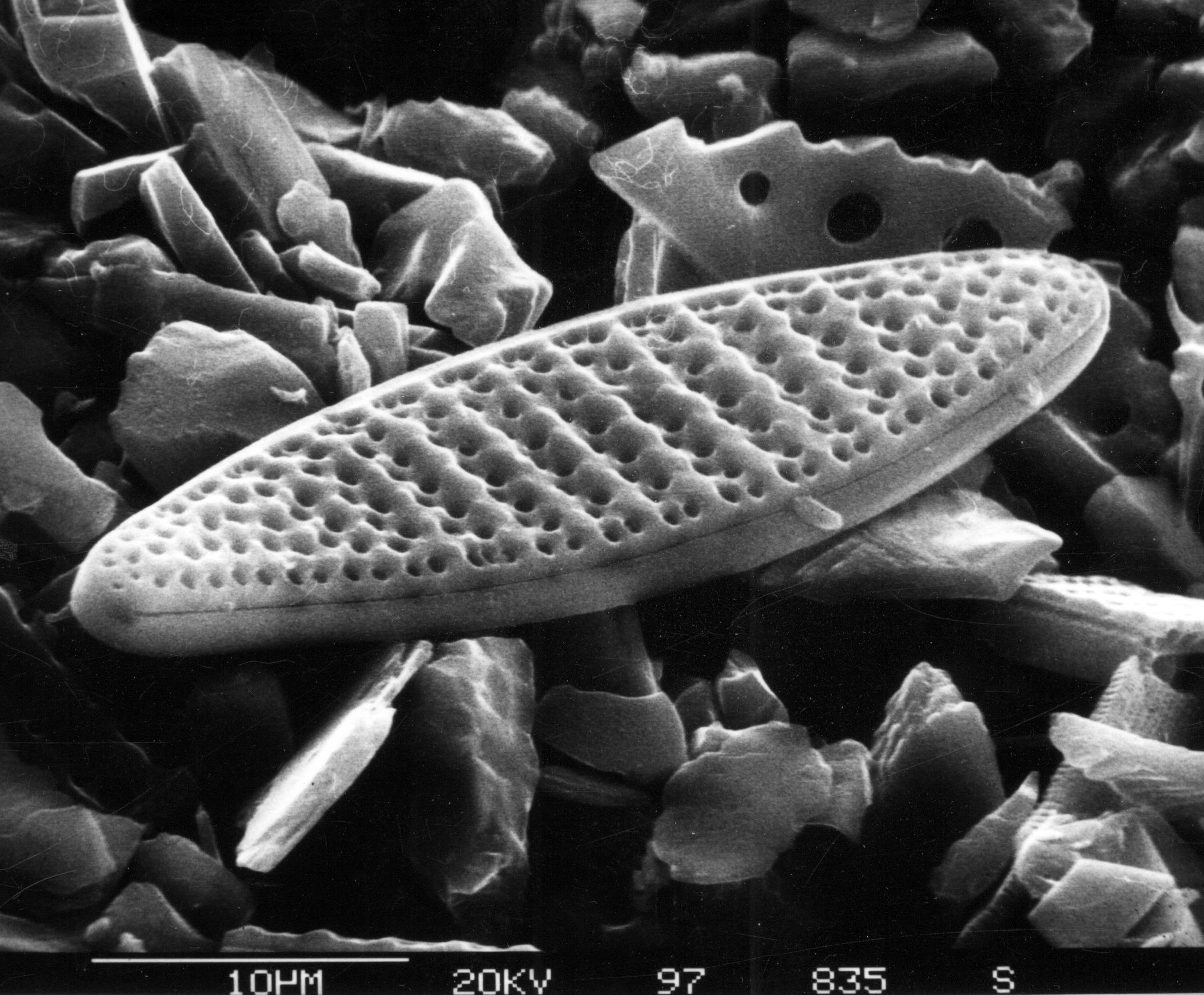

Scientific classification
- Domain: Eukaryota
- Clade: Sar
- Clade: Stramenopiles
- Division: Ochrophyta
- Clade: Bacillariophyta
- Class: Bacillariophyceae
- Order: Bacillariales
- Family: Bacillariaceae
- Genus: Fragilariopsis
- Species: F. kerguelensis

Binomial name
- Fragilariopsis kerguelensis (O'Meara) Hustedt

Synonyms
- Terebraria kerguelensis; Fragilaria antarctica; Fragilaria kerguelensis; Fragilariopsis antarctica; Nitzschia kerguelensis; Terebraria kerguelensis; Trachysphenia australis var. kerguelensis

= Fragilariopsis kerguelensis =

Species of single-celled organism

Fragilariopsis kerguelensis, is a pennate diatom native to the Southern Ocean. It has been characterized as "the most abundant diatom in the Antarctic Seas".

== Description ==
Fragilariopsis kerguelensis is a unicellular, phototrophic, microalga with a range in size of 10 - 80 μm. It is encased in a heavily silicified cell wall, called the frustule, and is identified by its unique theca, raphe and striations, which distinguish it from other diatoms. They are native to pelagic environments of the Southern Ocean within a temperature range of -1° to 18° C. F. kerguelensis is known to form community chains that consist of 20-100 cells and can be up to 300 μm long.

== Use as a paleoceanographic proxy ==
Fragilariopsis kerguelensis is well preserved in the fossil record and commonly referenced as a paleoceanographic or paleoclimatic proxy. F. kerguelensis comprises the largest deposit of biogenic silica in the Southern Ocean (~75%) though the region only accounts for 20% of global production. It is an open water species and is found in its highest abundance between the Antarctic Circumpolar Current and the Subtropical Front. This, along with its tendency to increase valve size near polar fronts, makes F. kerguelensis an ideal indicator of paleoclimate polar front or low-carbon, high-silica exporting regimes. Modern assemblages with F. kerguelensis can be used to calculate past sea surface temperature through the use of transfer functions.
