= Antarctic Polar Front =

Antarctic Polar Front may refer to:

- The Antarctic Convergence, in oceanography
- The Polar Front commonly known as the "Antarctic Front", in atmospheric science and meteorology
