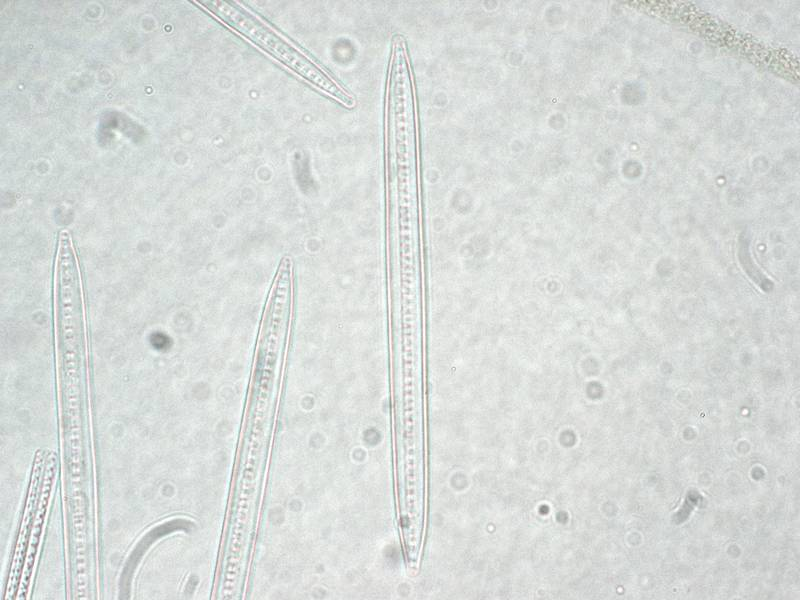

Scientific classification
- Domain: Eukaryota
- Clade: Sar
- Clade: Stramenopiles
- Division: Ochrophyta
- Clade: Bacillariophyta
- Class: Bacillariophyceae
- Order: Bacillariales
- Family: Bacillariaceae
- Genus: Bacillaria
- Species: B. paxillifer

Binomial name
- Bacillaria paxillifer (O. F. Müll.) Hendy (1951)

Synonyms
- Bacillaria paradoxa Gmelin; Nitzschia paradoxa

= Bacillaria paxillifer =

Species of single-celled organism

Bacillaria paxillifer (or Bacillaria paxillifera) is a colonial diatom species in the family Bacillariaceae. Bacillaria paxillifer is homotypic with Bacillaria paradoxa, but B. paxillifera is the correct name.

Bacillaria have a unique form of colonial motility among diatoms. Individual cells (with their long axes parallel to one another) slide against their neighbors in a coordinated fashion, allowing the entire structure to expand or contract.

== Taxonomy ==
Bacillaria paxillifer was originally described under the name Vibrio paxillifer by Otto Frederick Müller in 1786. It is the first diatom species known to be described. It was separately described two years later (1788) by Johann Friedrich Gmelin as Bacillaria paradoxa. The correct name, Bacillaria paxillifera (O.F.Müll.) N.I.Hendey. (1951), was established based on rules of priority.

== The Bacillaria Shuffle ==
In October 1987, at a North American Diatom Symposium meeting in Tomahawk, Wisconsin, Edward C. Theriot and P. Roger Sweets invented a dance called the Bacillaria Shuffle, based on the movements of the microorganism. The dance involved the dancers sliding against each other while chanting "Do the Bacillaria!" It was very chaotic and involved falling over, despite it not being officially part of the dance, due to the participants being drunk.

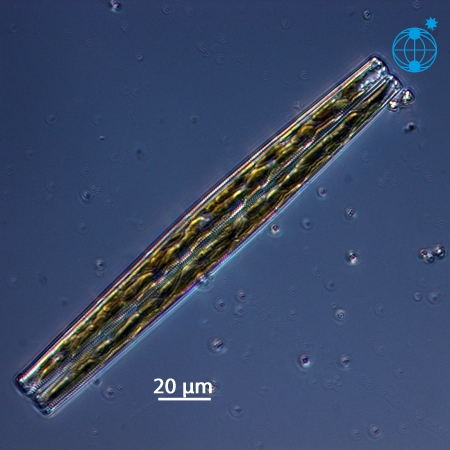
Bacillaria paxillifer

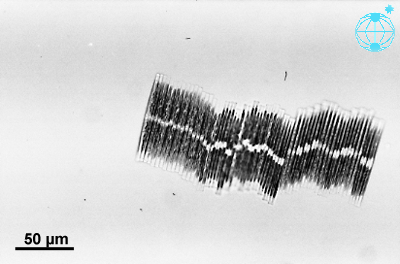
Bacillaria paxillifer
