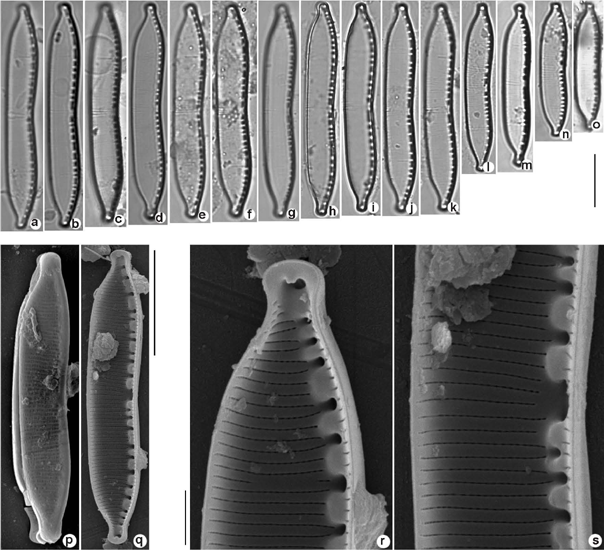

Scientific classification
- Domain: Eukaryota
- Clade: Sar
- Clade: Stramenopiles
- Division: Ochrophyta
- Clade: Bacillariophyta
- Class: Bacillariophyceae
- Order: Bacillariales
- Family: Bacillariaceae
- Genus: Hantzschia
- Species: H. amphioxys

Binomial name
- Hantzschia amphioxys (Ehrenberg) Grunow, 1880

= Hantzschia amphioxys =

Species of single-celled organism

Hantzschia amphioxys is a species of diatom belonging to the family Bacillariaceae.

It has cosmopolitan distribution.
