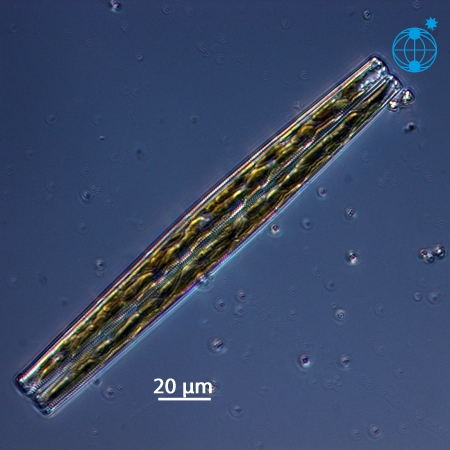
- Bacillaria paxillifer

Scientific classification
- Domain: Eukaryota
- Clade: Diaphoretickes
- Clade: SAR
- Clade: Stramenopiles
- Phylum: Gyrista
- Subphylum: Ochrophytina
- Class: Bacillariophyceae
- Order: Bacillariales
- Family: Bacillariaceae
- Genus: Bacillaria; J.F. Gmelin (1791)

= Bacillaria =

Genus of single-celled organisms

Bacillaria is a diatom genus in the family Bacillariaceae.

External videos
- Bacillaria: Distractingly Beautiful Crystal Colonies – Journey to the Microcosmos

== Species ==
- Bacillaria paradoxa Gmelin 1788
- Bacillaria paxillifer (O.F. Müller) Hendey (1951)

== Lifecycle ==
This genus is photosynthetic, and reproduces sexually and asexually.

== Description ==
Cells are elongated and motile, sliding along each other, in stacked colonies. Cells are rectangular in girdle view (when in colonies), and lanceolate in valve view. Raphe system is slightly keeled and runs from pole to pole. Two large plate-like chloroplasts are present, one near each end of the cell. The nucleus is located centrally. Cells are yellow-brown in colour. Fibulae are strong, and the valve surface is covered in transverse parallel structures called striae.

Video of several diatoms of the genus Bacillaria moving, in real time

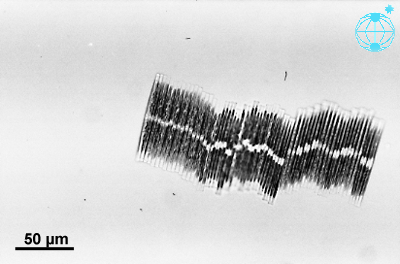
Bacillaria paxillifer

== Space station ==
Three diatom species were sent to the International Space Station, together with the huge (6 mm length) diatoms of Antarctica and the exclusive colonial diatom, Bacillaria paradoxa. The cells of Bacillaria moved next to each other in partial but opposite synchrony by a microfluidics method.

== Measurements ==
Length (apical axis): 70 - 200 μm

Width (trans-apical axis): 5 - 8 μm

Height (Pervalvar axis): 5 - 10 μm

Fibulae: 7 - 9 in 10 μm

Striae: 20 - 21 in 10 μm

== Habitat ==
Benthic zone, marine and brackish/freshwater species, but is also commonly found in plankton.
