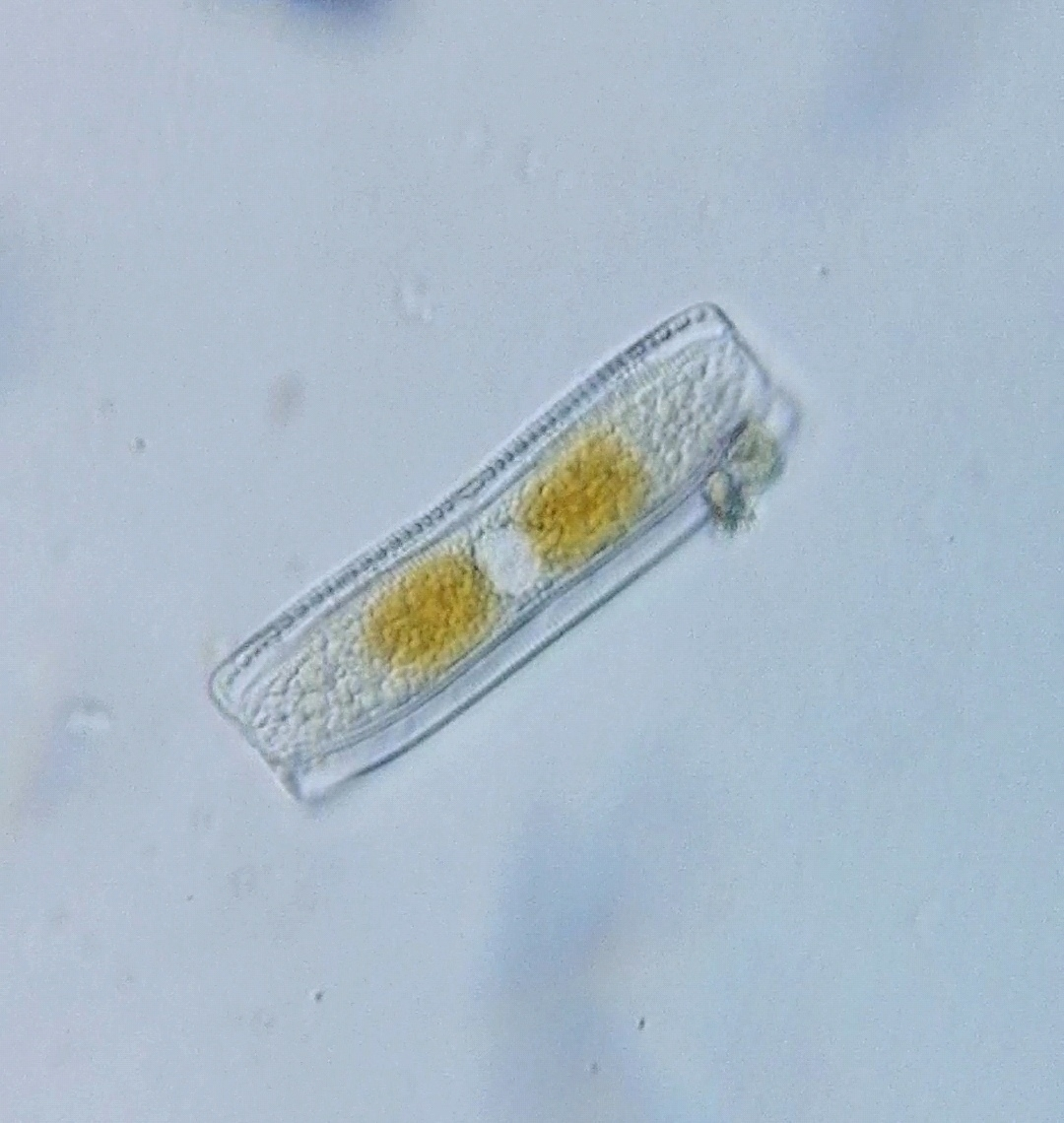
- Hantzschia sp.

Scientific classification
- Domain: Eukaryota
- Clade: Diaphoretickes
- Clade: SAR
- Clade: Stramenopiles
- Phylum: Gyrista
- Subphylum: Ochrophytina
- Class: Bacillariophyceae
- Order: Bacillariales
- Family: Bacillariaceae
- Genus: Hantzschia; Grunow

= Hantzschia =

Genus of single-celled organisms

Hantzschia is a genus of diatoms belonging to the family Bacillariaceae.

The genus was first described by Albert Grunow in 1877.

The genus name of Hantzschia is in honour of Carl August Hantzsch (1825 - 1886), who was a German botanist (Algology).

Species:

- Hantzschia amphioxys
- Hantzschia spectabilis
- Hantzschia virgata
