= Great Atlantic Sargassum Belt =

Mass of Sargassum in Atlantic Ocean

The Great Atlantic Sargassum Belt Sargasso Sea major currents in the North Atlantic

The Great Atlantic Sargassum Belt (GASB) is a recurring Sargassum bloom in the Atlantic Ocean. It is the largest macroalgae bloom in the world to date.

The GASB has ecological impacts on beaches, water quality, and organisms, as well as health impacts on humans. The recurrence of this bloom has affected economies, especially of countries affected in the Caribbean.

== Development of the bloom ==
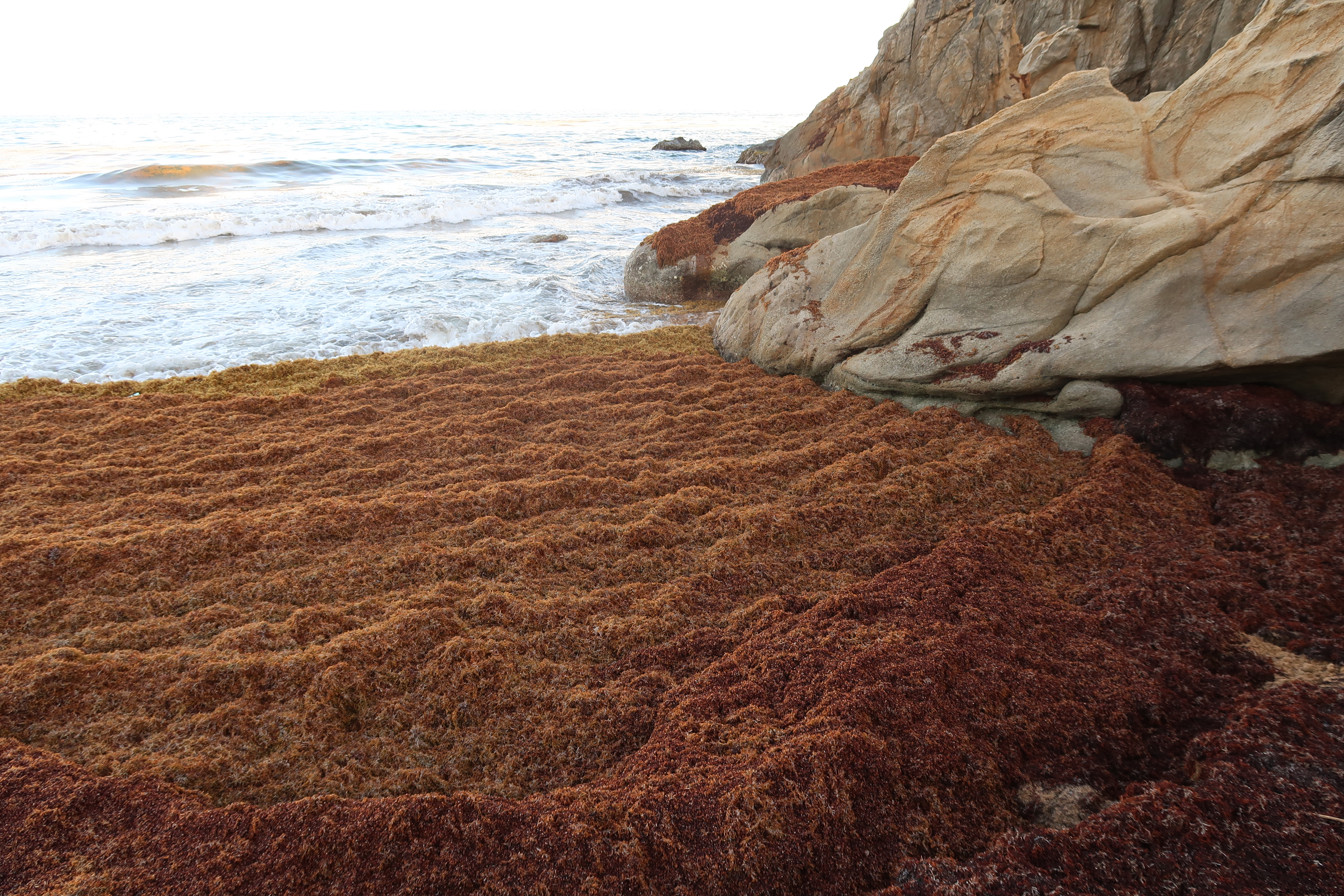
Washed-up Sargassum on Punta Tuna Beach, Puerto Rico

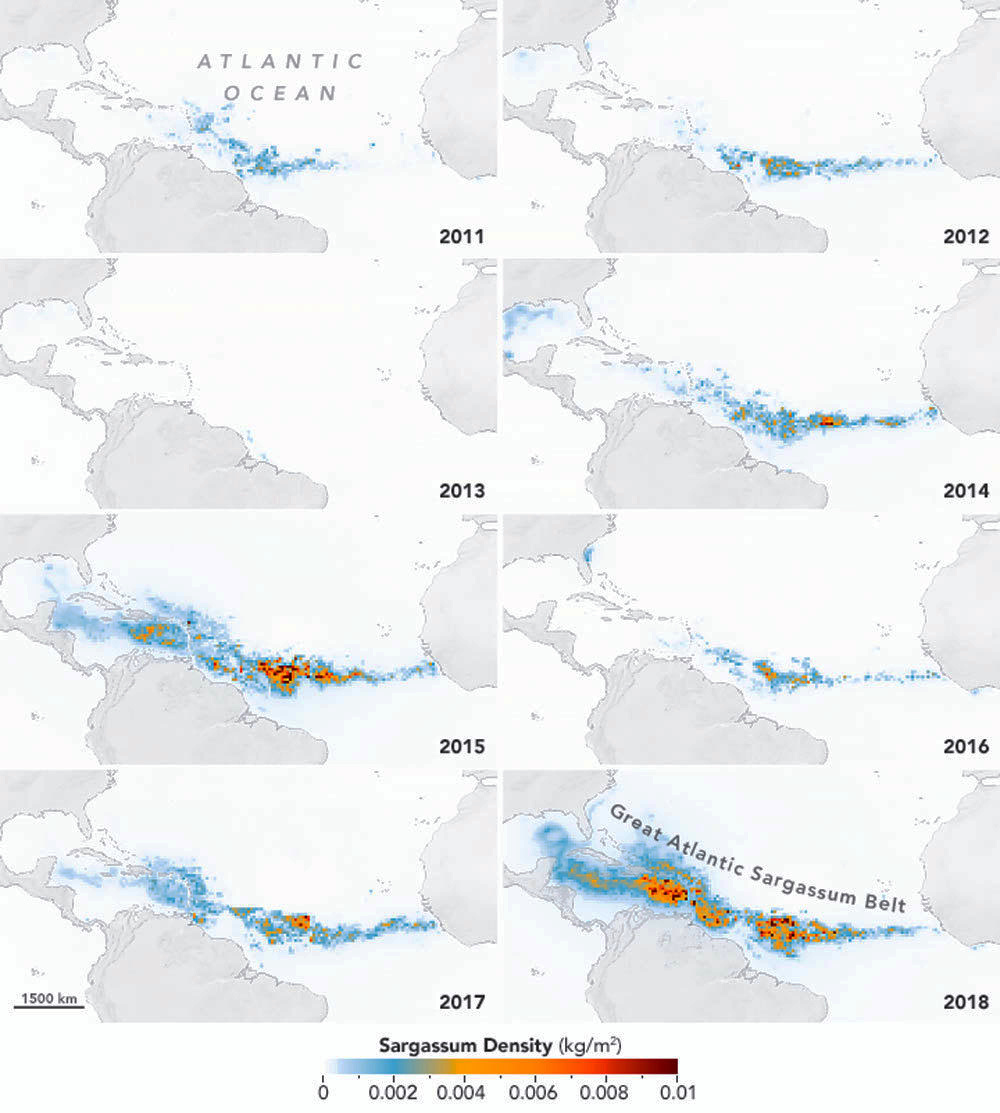
The development of the belt 2011–2018

Mats of Sargassum in this region of the Atlantic are not new, having been reported as far back as the 15th century. In the summer of 2011, a bloom large enough to be noticeable in satellite imagery appeared for the first time, and has appeared most summers since. This huge bloom in 2011 is thought to have been caused by unusually strong upwelling and high river discharge in the Atlantic Ocean.

The only year that the bloom has not appeared was 2013. This absence of a Sargassum bloom in 2013 led to an accumulation of nutrients, creating optimal conditions for a big bloom in 2014 and the following years.

In June 2022, the belt was estimated to weigh 24.2 million tons. It was made of many individual patches, some up to an acre in surface area.

Strandings in the Mexican Caribbean began in late 2014 and increased hyperbolically to roughly 1.5 million tons in 2022 and 3.4 million tons in 2025. In general, in Florida, algal blooms have been growing larger and are arriving earlier.

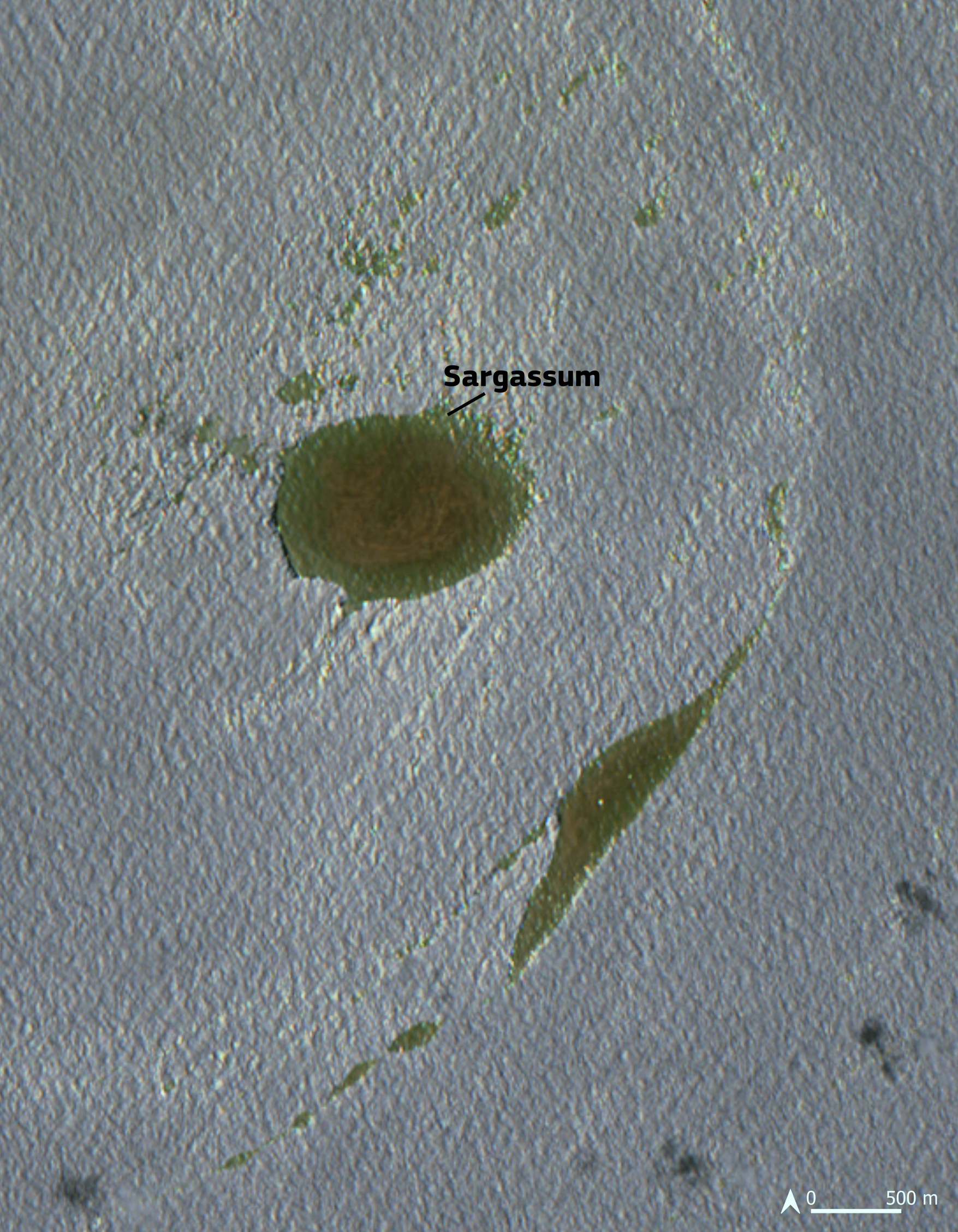
A 1-kilometre-wide (0.62 mi) patch of sargassum in the Caribbean Sea

== Effects ==
=== Ecological impacts ===
During heavy blooms, the huge tangles of seaweed can ensnare larger wildlife like dolphins, sometimes fatally. Huge amounts of seaweed wash up on beaches, rotting and attracting insects. Epibionts living on Sargassum alter naturally occurring seaweed and seagrasses that get washed up, impacting habitats, food webs, and nutrient cycling. When mats of Sargassum are present, macrophytes and mangroves experience less growth due to a lack of sunlight penetrating the water. Additionally, accumulation of Sargassum on beaches can raise the temperature of nearby sea turtle nests, impacting nesting patterns in the future and the hatchling sex ratio. Pelagic Sargassum is an important source of biodiversity in the region as it hosts a whole ecosystem, including many endemic species. Pelagic Sargassum may also act as a minor carbon sink. With declining conditions in coastal ecosystems like marshes and mangroves due to human activity, this could play an increasingly important role in decreasing atmospheric carbon.

Food web dynamics are impacted by Sargassum because of the extra nutrients and algae in the water that change natural feeding behaviors of herbivorous shallow-water animals.

Sargassum accumulation near coasts leaves particulate matter in the water, resulting in a murky, brown appearance and decreased light penetration. The mats can also collect contaminants, including microplastics, that further the degradation of water quality.

Decomposing Sargassum also releases organic matter that decreases water quality near the shore. This buildup of organic matter leads to eutrophication.

=== Impacts on human health ===
As beached Sargassum decomposes, usually 48 hours after it washes ashore, it releases hydrogen sulfide and ammonia gas, and airborne toxic exposure begins. Hydrogen sulfide which smells like rotting eggs, irritates skin, eyes, throat and airways being particularly harmful to people with respiratory problems such as asthma. As an example of the magnitude of its public health impact, in 2018, 11,000 cases of acute sargassum toxicity were observed in Martinique and Guadeloupe over the course of 8 months. Five years later the problem in the same area was undiminished.

Hydrogen sulfide and ammonia oxidize, and eventually corrode, metal in essential applications for humans, such as sink fixtures, plumbing, air conditioning and metal roofs. There is not enough information about human health impacts through chronic toxicity at lower doses, but observational studies show an increased risk of preeclampsia and sleep apnea and besides skin, conjunctival and upper airway irritation, also neurologic symptoms like vestibular syndrome, and cognitive impairment like memory loss, and learning problems. In 2025, about half of sargassum cleanup workers in Mexico were exposed to more than the occupational standard of 1 ppm for an 8 h shift, and they had toxic effects even at exposures below 5 ppm.

Vibrio bacteria, which can cause necrotizing fasciitis in extreme cases, are found in large numbers in the mats of seaweed. The bacteria readily stick to Sargassum algae and the plastic debris that gets tangled in it. The presence of Sargassum in coastal areas prevents residents from fishing for their own consumption in some cases, which has led to food insecurity in areas.

=== Economic impacts ===
Washed-up Sargassum rots on beaches, attracting insects and impacting communities across the Caribbean, including air pollution alerts and school closures. There has been a decrease in tourism for many countries in the Caribbean attributable to public perception of Sargassum.

Hydroids are carried by Sargassum. They can cause issues for the fishing and aquaculture industries, as they are known to cause rashes in humans and can adapt to many different environments. Fishermen in the Caribbean have been either physically impacted in their boats or by the corrosive damage to their electronic engines. There has been a higher fish mortality due to the Sargassum belt. However, in some countries like the Dominican Republic, there have been reports of increased catch for certain species.

Removal of beached Sargassum is expensive, getting up to hundreds of millions of dollars in some places. This, along with the decrease in activity of large economic sectors, has created a major obstacle for countries experiencing annual Sargassum inundations. As of 2025, in Miami-Dade County, Florida, alone, 19 tractors remove sargassum up to twice a day at a cost of 9 million USD per year, but losses in tourism and fishing in Florida are at least $2.7 up to 5 billion.

== Cause ==
While there is no single cause of the GASB, the shape of the belt seems to align with circulation patterns of water in the tropical Atlantic Ocean.

The buildup of Sargassum is caused by nutrients flowing into the Atlantic from water discharged by the Amazon and upwelling currents off West Africa. The algae does not originate from the nearby Sargasso Sea as was previously hypothesized, as the Sargassum mats found in that sea are composed of different morphological types of Sargassum than those that dominate the Sargassum Belt.

Simulated particles on computational models suggest that Sargassum enters the central Atlantic from West Africa.

== Future of the bloom ==
The GASB is predicted to continue appearing year-to-year as seeds are still present in the tropics and waters will continue to experience nutrient enrichment from land.

Scientific and technological advances are allowing scientists to better study and mitigate the impacts of the GASB. There may be ways to harvest Sargassum and use it in energy production in the future, thus creating a sustainable use for biomass. As of 2026, it is used as cooking fuel in Grenada and made into fertilizers by Algas Organics and CarbonWave. In 2021 it has been suggested that forecasting events and taking preventative action will be more cost effective than removing Sargassum off of beaches.

== See also ==
- Great Calcite Belt
- North Atlantic garbage patch
