= Whiting event =

Suspension of fine-grained calcium carbonate particles in water bodies

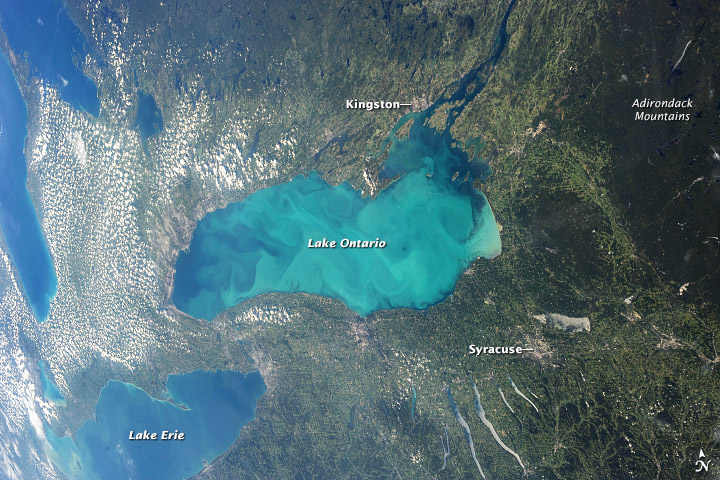
An aerial view of a whiting event precipitation cloud in Lake Ontario.

A whiting event is a phenomenon that occurs when a suspended cloud of fine-grained calcium carbonate precipitates in water bodies, typically during summer months, as a result of photosynthetic microbiological activity or sediment disturbance. The phenomenon gets its name from the white, chalky color it imbues to the water. These events have been shown to occur in temperate waters as well as tropical ones, and they can span for hundreds of meters. They can also occur in both marine and freshwater environments. The origin of whiting events is debated among the scientific community, and it is unclear if there is a single, specific cause. Generally, they are thought to result from either bottom sediment re-suspension or by increased activity of certain microscopic life such as phytoplankton. Because whiting events affect aquatic chemistry, physical properties, and carbon cycling, studying the mechanisms behind them holds scientific relevance in various ways.

== Characteristics ==
Whiting event clouds consist of calcium carbonate polymorphs; aragonite tends to be the dominant precipitate, but some studies in oligotrophic and mesotrophic lakes show calcite is favored. Whiting events have been observed in tropical and temperate waters, and they can potentially cover hundreds of meters. They tend to occur more often in summer months, as warmer waters promote calcium carbonate precipitation, and in hard waters. Whitings are typically characterized by cloudy, white patches of water, but they can also be tanner in hue in very shallow waters (less than 5m deep). In some cases, the whiting might be cryptic (not visible at the surface), but still generate calcium carbonate. These shallow water whiting events also tend to last less than a day in comparison to deeper water events that can last for several days up to several months. Regardless of the event's lifespan, the clouds it produces increase turbidity and hamper light penetration.

== Potential causes ==
Some debate exists surrounding the exact cause of whiting events. And although much research exists on the subject, there is still no definitive consensus on the chemical mechanisms behind them. The three most commonly suggested causes for the phenomenon are: microbiological processes, re-suspension of marine or bottom sediments, and spontaneous direct precipitation from water. Of these three, the last has been ruled unlikely due to the unfavorable reaction kinetics of spontaneous calcium carbonate precipitation. It is also worth noting that it may be possible for more than one of the aforementioned factors to contribute to whiting events in the same region.

=== Microbiological activity ===
Substantial findings indicate photosynthetic picoplankton, picocyanobacteria, and phytoplankton activity creates favorable conditions for carbonate precipitation. This link arises as a result of planktonic blooms being observed coinciding with the events. Subsequently, via photosynthesis, these organisms uptake inorganic carbon, raise water pH, and alter water alkalinity, which promotes calcium carbonate precipitation. The thermodynamic influence of inorganic carbon on whiting calcium carbonate production is shown in the equation below. Furthermore, cases exist in which the type of calcium carbonate found in the whiting cloud matches the type found on local cyanobacteria membranes. It's hypothesized that the extracellular polymeric substances (EPS) these microorganisms produce can act as seed crystals that provide a start for the precipitation process. Current research on the specifics of these EPS and the exact physiological mechanisms of the microorganisms' carbon uptake, however, are limited.

$\ce{2 HCO3- (aq) + Ca^2+ (aq) <=> CaCO3 (s) + H2O + CO2}$

=== Sediment re-suspension ===
In shallower waters, evidence supports that activity of local fisherman and marine life such as fish and certain shark species can disturb bottom sediments containing calcium carbonate particles and lead to their suspension. In addition, as microorganisms impact water chemistry in observable ways and require certain nutrient levels to thrive, whiting events found occurring in nutrient-poor waters where no significant alkalinity difference exists between whiting and non-whiting waters support the idea of sediment re-suspension as a primary cause.

== Relevance ==
Whiting events have a unique effect on the waters around them. The fact that calcium carbonate clouds increase turbidity and light reflectance holds implications for organisms and processes that depend on light. In addition, whiting events can function as a transport mechanism for organic carbon to the benthic zone, which is relevant to nutrient cycling. The cyanobacteria abundant clouds also hold the potential to act as a means to study the microorganism's role in carbon cycling (especially in relation to climate change) and their possible role in finding petroleum source rocks.
