= Pennales =

Scientific classification
- Domain: Eukaryota
- Clade: Sar
- Clade: Stramenopiles
- Phylum: Ochrophyta
- Clade: Diatomeae
- Subphylum: Bacillariophytina
- Class: Bacillariophyceae
- Order: Pennales

Proposed order of diatoms

The order Pennales is a proposed traditional subdivision of the heterokont algae known as diatoms. The order is named for the shape of the cell walls (or valves or frustules) of pennate diatoms, which are elongated in valve view. The valves may be linear or oval in shape, and usually bear bilaterally symmetrical ornamental patterns. These patterns are composed of a series of transverse lines (known as striae) that can appear as rows of dots when viewed with an optical microscope. Some pennate diatoms also exhibit a fissure along their longitudinal axis. This is known as a raphe, and is involved in gliding movements made by diatom cells; motile diatoms always possess a raphe.

In terms of cell cycle, vegetative cells are diploid and undergo mitosis during normal cell division. Periodically, meiosis produces morphologically identical haploid gametes (isogametes), which fuse to produce a (sometimes binucleate) zygote that develops into an auxospore (from which full-sized vegetative cells are produced).

In some taxonomic schemes, the pennate diatoms are divided into two groups: pennate diatoms without a raphe (a seam or ridge), known as araphids (order Fragilariophyceae), and pennate diatoms with a raphe, known as raphids (order Bacillariophyceae).

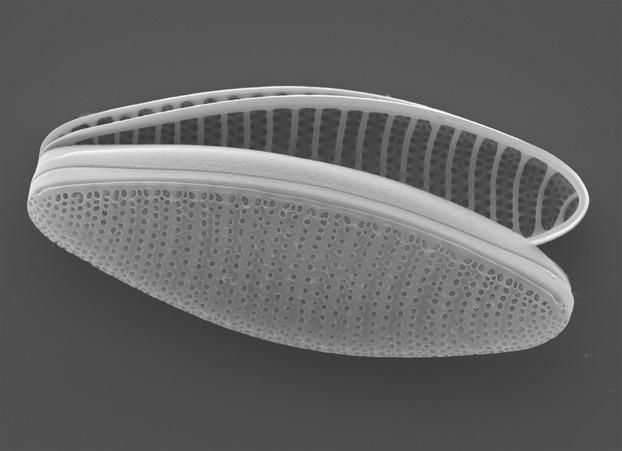
Pennate diatom without a raphe (Fragilariopsis kerguelensis)

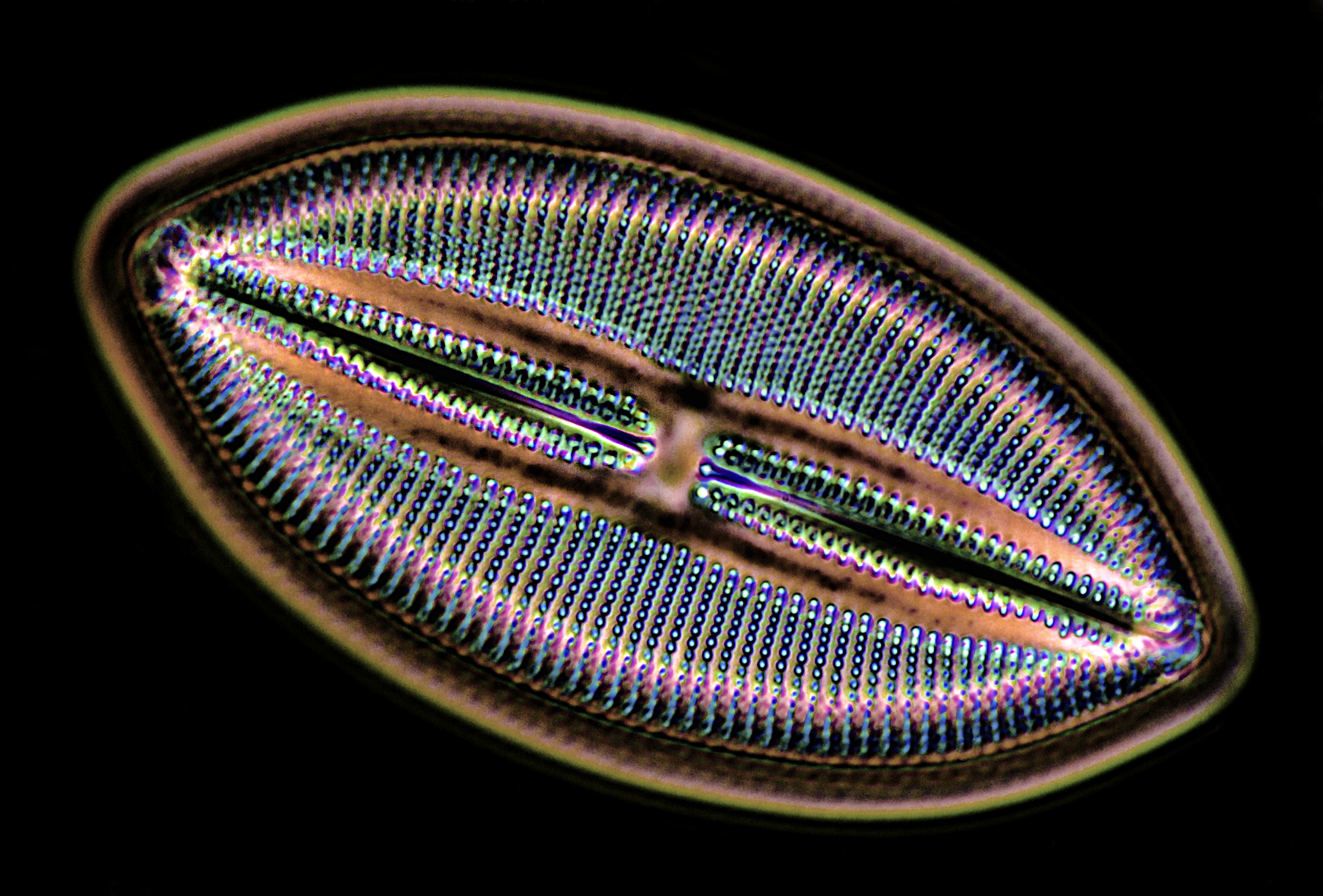
Pennate diatom with a raphe (Lyrella hennedy)

== See also ==
- Centrales
- Clepsydra
