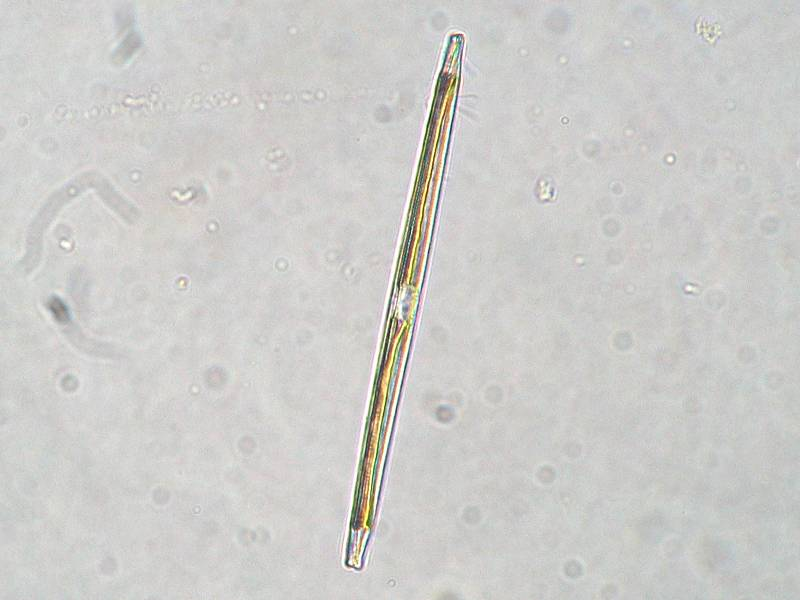
- Nitzschia sp.
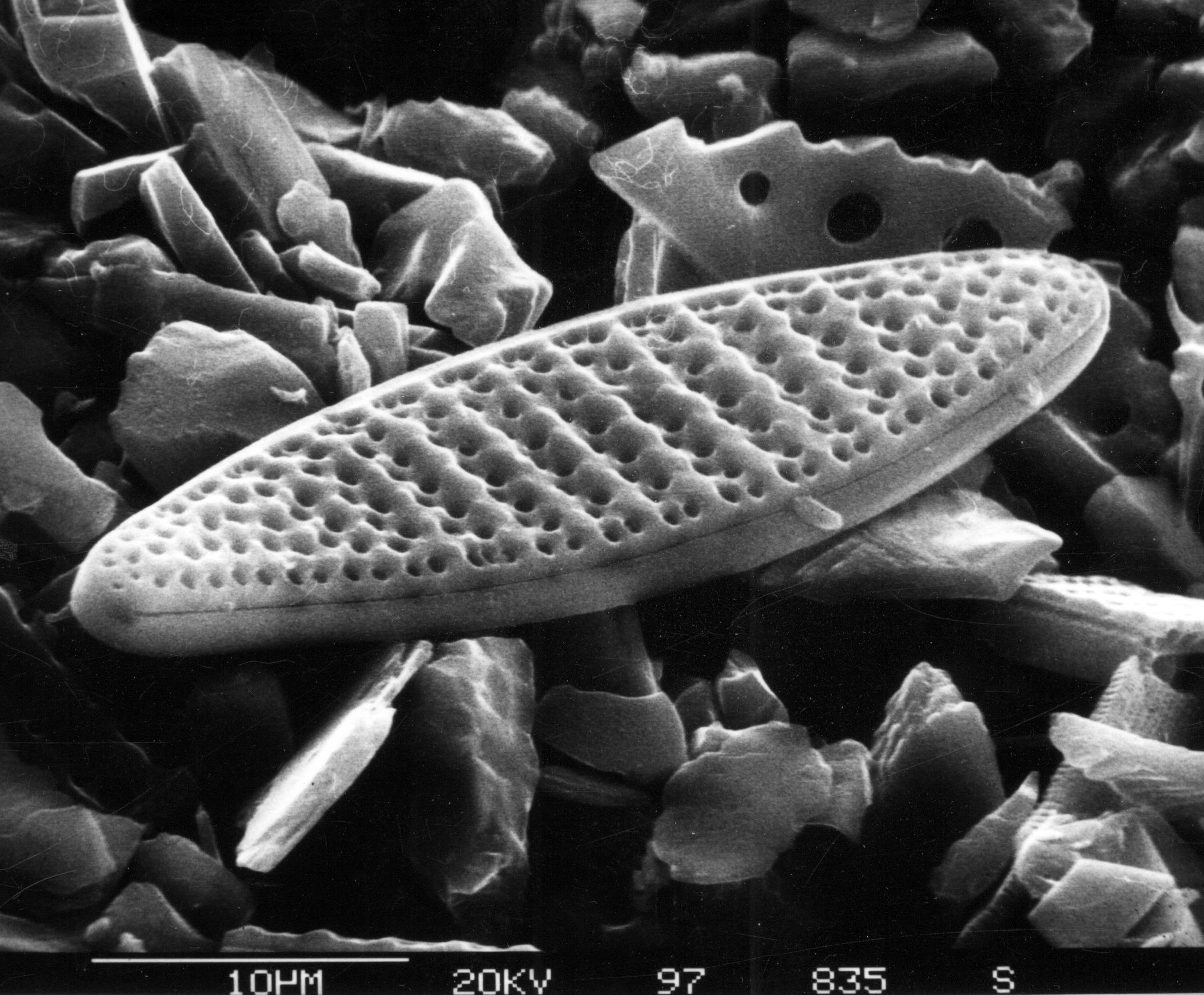
- A microfossil of Nitzschia kerguelensis in marine sediment

Scientific classification
- Domain: Eukaryota
- Clade: Sar
- Clade: Stramenopiles
- Phylum: Ochrophyta
- Clade: Diatomeae
- Class: Bacillariophyceae
- Subclass: Bacillariophycidae
- Genus: Nitzschia; Hassall, 1845

Species
- See text

= Nitzschia =

Genus of single-celled organisms

Nitzschia is a common pennate marine and freshwater diatom. In the scientific literature, this genus, named after Christian Ludwig Nitzsch, is sometimes referred to incorrectly as Nitzchia, and it has many species described, which all have a similar morphology. In its current circumscription, Nitzschia is paraphyletic.

== Occurrence ==
Nitzschia is found mostly in colder waters, and is associated with both Arctic and Antarctic polar sea ice, where it is often found to be the dominant diatom. Nitzschia includes several species of diatoms known to produce the neurotoxin known as domoic acid, a toxin responsible for the human illness called amnesic shellfish poisoning. The species N. frigida is found to grow exponentially even at temperatures between −4 and −6 °C. Some Nitzschia species are also extremophiles by dint of tolerance to high salinity; for example, some halophilic species of Nitzschia are found in the Makgadikgadi Pans in Botswana.

== Species ==
The genus Nitzschia includes more than 1280 species and variants — for more information, see: "Genus: Nizschia". algaebase.org. Some of these are:

- Nitzschia acicularis
- Nitzschia amphibia
- Nitzschia angustata
- Nitzschia brevissima
- Nitzschia clausii
- Nitzschia communis
- Nitzschia denticula
- Nitzschia disputata
- Nitzschia dissipata
- Nitzschia filiformis
- Nitzschia fonticola
- Nitzschia frigida
- Nitzschia gracilis
- Nitzschia heuflerania
- Nitzschia invisitata
- Nitzschia lacuum
- Nitzschia latens
- Nitzschia palea
- Nitzschia perminuta
- Nitzschia pusilla
- Nitzschia recta
- Nitzschia sigma
- Nitzschia sigmoidea
- Nitzschia sinuata
- Nitzschia tubicola
