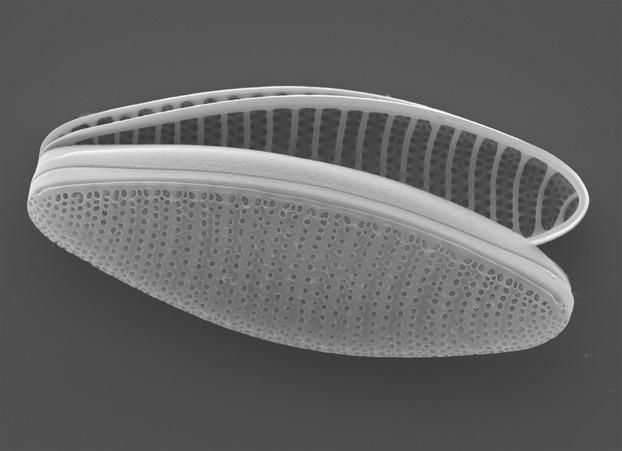
- Fragilariopsis kerguelensis

Scientific classification
- Domain: Eukaryota
- Supergroup: Stramenopiles
- Division: Ochrophyta
- Clade: Bacillariophyta
- Class: Bacillariophyceae
- Order: Bacillariales
- Family: Bacillariaceae
- Genus: Fragilariopsis; F.Hustedt, 1913

= Fragilariopsis =

Genus of algae

Fragilariopsis is a genus of diatoms belonging to the family Bacillariaceae. It is a scaffold level genome with 271 scaffolds and 0 assembled chromosomes.

The genus has cosmopolitan distribution.

== Species ==
Species:

- Fragilariopsis acuta Hajós
- Fragilariopsis atlantica Paasche
- Fragilariopsis cylindrus (Grunow ex Cleve) Helmcke & Krieger
- Fragilariopsis kerguelensis (O'Meara) Hustedt
