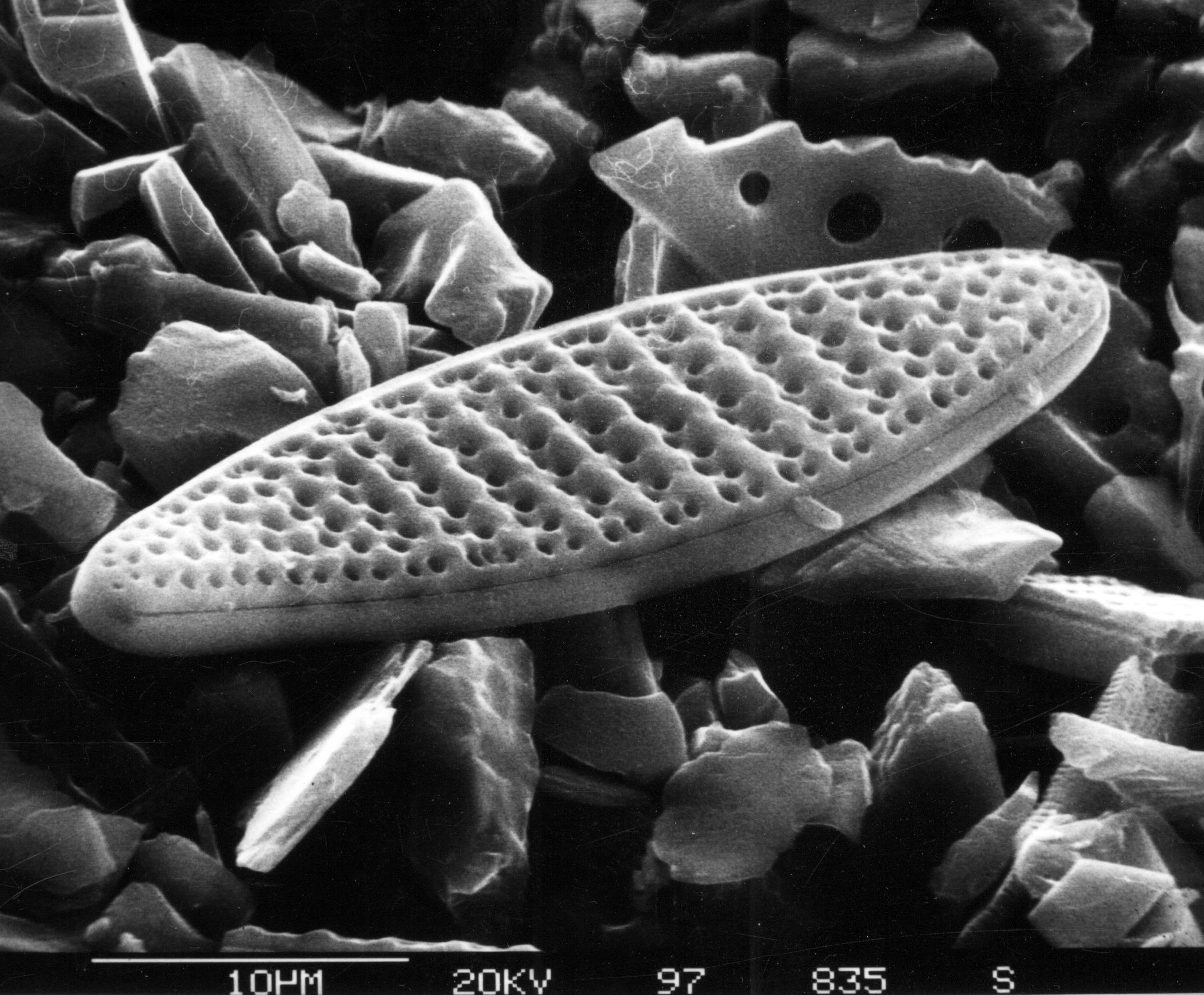
- Nitzschia kerguelensis

Scientific classification
- Domain: Eukaryota
- Clade: Sar
- Clade: Stramenopiles
- Division: Ochrophyta
- Clade: Bacillariophyta
- Class: Bacillariophyceae
- Order: Bacillariales; Hendey 1937 sensu emend.
- Family: Bacillariaceae; Ehrenb.

= Bacillariaceae =

Family of single-celled organisms

Bacillariaceae is a family of diatoms, the only family in the order Bacillariales. Some species of genera such as Nitzschia are found in halophilic environments; for example, in the seasonally flooded Makgadikgadi Pans in Botswana.

== Genera ==
This family includes these genera:

- Allonitzschia A.Mann, 1925 (1)
- Bacillaria Gmelin (155)
- Crucidenticula F.Akiba & Y.Yanagisawa, 1986 (8)
- Cylindrotheca Rabenh.
- Cymbellonitzschia Hustedt in A.Schmidt et al. (7)
- Denticula Kütz. (178)
- Denticulopsis R. Simonsen and T. Kanaya, 1961 (20)
- Fragilariopsis Hustedt in A. Schmidt (41)
- Gomphonitzschia A.Grunow, 1868 (14)
- Grunowia L.Rabenhorst, 1864 (19)
- Hantzschia Grunow, 1877 (258)
- Neodenticula Akiba and Yanagisawa, 1986 (2)
- Nitzschia Hassall, 1845 (2k)
- Nitzschiella L.Rabenhorst, 1864 (18)
- Ophidocampa C.G.Ehrenberg, 1870 (15)
- Perrya F.Kitton, 1874 (7)
- Psammodictyon D.G.Mann, 1990 (5)
- Pseudo-nitzschia H. Perag. and Perag., 1900 (81)
- Simonsenia H.Lange-Bertalot, 1979 (3)
- Tryblionella W.Sm., 1853 (103)

Figures in brackets are approx. how many species per family.

== See also ==
- Extremophile
