= Polar front =

Type of weather boundary

Atmospheric circulation diagram, showing the Hadley cell, the Ferrel cell, the Polar cell, and the various upwelling and subsidence zones between them

In meteorology, the polar front is the weather front boundary between the polar cell and the Ferrel cell around the 60° latitude, near the polar regions, in both hemispheres. At this boundary a sharp gradient in temperature occurs between these two air masses, each at very different temperatures.

The polar front arises as a result of cold polar air meeting warm tropical air. It is a stationary front as the air masses are not moving against each other and stays stable. Off the coast of eastern North America, especially in winter, there is a sharp temperature gradient between the snow-covered land and the warm offshore currents.

The polar front theory says that mid-latitude extratropical cyclones form on boundaries between warm and cold air. In winter, the polar front shifts towards the Equator, whereas high pressure systems dominate more in the summer.

== See also ==
- Polar vortex
- Horse latitudes
- Intertropical Convergence Zone
