= Subtropical front =

A subtropical front is a surface water mass boundary or front, which is a narrow zone of transition between air masses of contrasting density, air masses of different temperatures or different water vapour concentrations. It is also characterized by an unforeseen change in wind direction, and speed across its surface between water systems, which are based on temperature and salinity. The subtropical separates the more saline subtropical waters from the fresher sub-Antarctic waters.

== Subtropical frontal zone ==
A subtropical frontal zone (STFZ) is a large seasonal cycle located on the eastern side of basins. It is made up of fronts of multiple weak sea surface temperature (SST), aligned northwest–southeast, spread over a large latitudinal span. On the far eastern side of basins, the subtropical frontal zone becomes narrower and temperature gradients stronger, but still much weaker than across the dynamical subtropical frontal zone.

A dynamical frontal zone sits at the southern limit of the saline subtropical waters on the western sides of basins. There are no water mass boundaries or fronts in correlation with the sea surface temperature at the subtropical frontal zone at the surface or beneath.

The structure of a subtropical frontal zone results in the formation of a positive wind stress curl, which is the shear stress exerted by wind on the surface of water. The areas of most positive wind stress curl are characterized by very weak sea surface temperature incline, and are likely consistent with regions of mode water.

== Northern subtropical front ==
The Northern subtropical front is found in the Pacific Ocean between 25° and 30° north latitude.

== North Atlantic subtropical fronts ==
The North Atlantic subtropical fronts possess the characteristics of seasonal variability. Highest front occurrences are during early spring in the western region. Less front probability occurs in late spring to early summer in the eastern region. The strengths of the fronts differ with seasons, building strength when moving southward during the winter and spring, and weakening when moving northward during the summer.

== North Pacific subtropical fronts ==
The North Pacific subtropical fronts are occupied by wind driven submesoscale subduction. Due to the constant thermohaline circulation fronts, cold air flows near the surface and bottom of the ocean. There are alternating fluxes throughout the year, that is influenced by jet streams which causes temperatures in these areas to differ.

== Southern subtropical front ==
The Southern subtropical front is caused by warm, salty subtropical waters and Antarctic waters, found in all three ocean basins. A commonly used criterion found is that the salinity at a depth of 100m drops below 34.9 practical salinity units.

== South Atlantic subtropical frontal zone ==
A characteristic of the South Atlantic subtropical frontal zone, between 15°W and 5°E, is the conversion from subtropical to sub-polar waters. As a result, this coerces the South Atlantic Current flow and is surrounded by a distinct front.

== See also ==
- Ocean current
