= Prymnesium parvum =

Scientific classification
- Domain: Eukaryota
- Division: Haptophyta
- Class: Prymnesiophyceae
- Order: Prymnesiales
- Family: Prymnesiaceae
- Genus: Prymnesium
- Species: P. parvum

Binomial name
- Prymnesium parvum N. Carter

Species of single-celled organism

Prymnesium parvum is a species of haptophyte (also collectively called Prymnesiophyta). The species is of concern because of its ability to produce the phycotoxin prymnesin. It is a flagellated alga that is normally found suspended in the water column. It was first identified in North America in 1985, but it is not known if it was introduced artificially (e.g., an invasive species) or missed in previous surveys. Toxin production mainly kills fish and appears to have little effect on cattle or humans. This distinguishes it from a red tide, which is an algal bloom whose toxins lead to harmful effects in people. Although no harmful effects are known, it is recommended not to consume dead or dying fish exposed to a P. parvum bloom.

Prymnesium parvum of Haptophyta is sometimes colloquially misnamed "golden alga" causing confusion with golden alga or Chrysophyceae of Heterokontophyta, leading to contradictions in terms, especially in non-scholarly texts (such as those from state wildlife departments).

== Biology ==
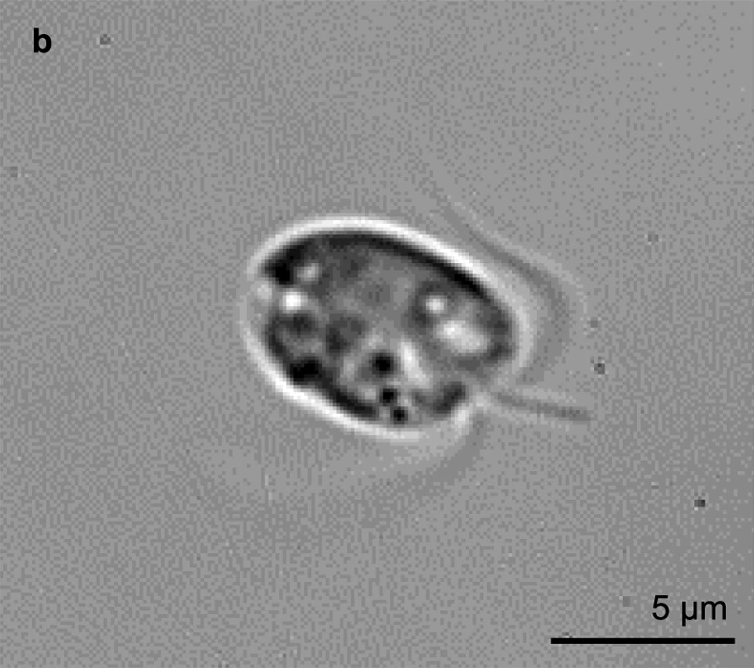
P. parvum

P. parvum grows in a salinity range of 0.5 - 30 psu (Practical Salinity Unit) with an optimum at 15 psu although strains collected in different places appear to have different salinity tolerances. A strain called LB 2797 (isolated from Colorado River in Texas) shows a biphasic growth pattern namely, maximum cell densities increased as salinity increased from 5 to 15 psu but decreased at higher levels in laboratory culture. The alga produces dimethylsulfoniopropionate (DMSP) and other unknown polyols, likely as an adaptation to osmoregulation. The environment must be between 2 °C (36 °F) and 30 °C (86 °F) for P. parvum to live. Growth at a pH of as low as 5.8 has been observed, but cells typically prefer higher pH ranges. The organism prefers highly light environments, but growth can be inhibited by excessive light (photoinhibition). The organism is capable of heterotrophic growth in the dark in the presence of glycerol and grazes on bacteria, especially when phosphate is limited. It has therefore been hypothesized that P. parvum satisfies its phosphate needs by consuming bacteria. P. parvum can use a wide range of nitrogen sources, including ammonium, nitrate, amino acids (which ones apparently depends on pH), creatine, but is unable to use urea.

New evidence has shown that the toxins produced by this alga are induced by physiological stresses, such as nitrogen and phosphorus depletion due to competition with the environment.

== Notable Prymnesium harmful algal blooms ==
A harmful algal bloom of Prymnesium parvum producing their prymnesin toxins was reportedly responsible for the death of approximately 360 tonnes of fish in the Oder river during the 2022 Oder environmental disaster. The pre-prymnesin precursors have been named as PKZILLA-1 and PKZILLA-2 with the first consisting of 45,212 amino acids making it the largest known protein.

== See also ==
- Algaculture
- Prymnesin-1
- Prymnesin-2
- Prymnesin-B1
