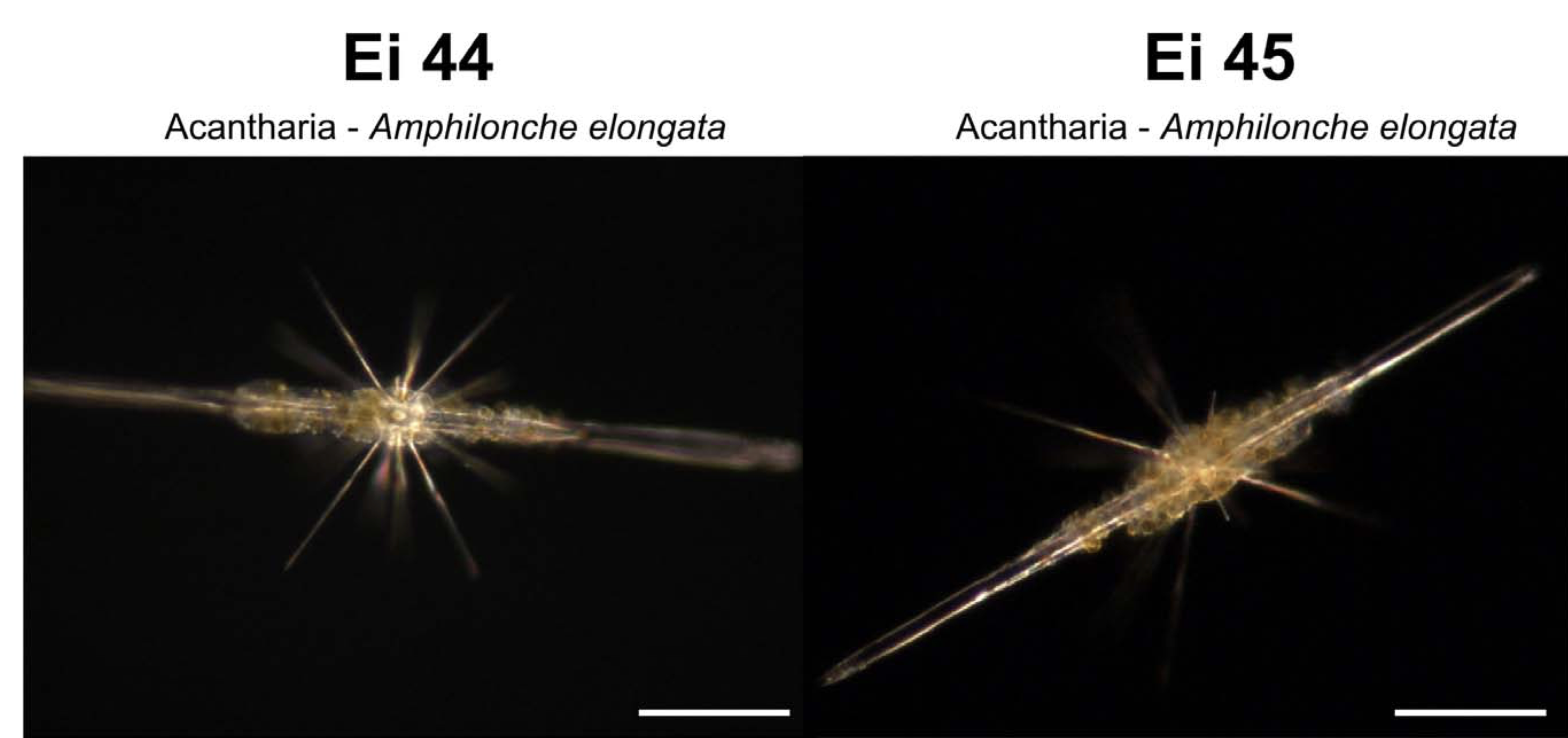
- Light microscopy images of A. elongata specimen from the Red Sea (Gulf of Eilat) (scale bars = 50 µm).

Scientific classification
- Domain: Eukaryota
- Clade: Sar
- Clade: Rhizaria
- Phylum: Radiozoa
- Class: Acantharia
- Order: Arthracanthida
- Family: Acanthometridae
- Genus: Amphilonche
- Species: A. elongata

Binomial name
- Amphilonche elongata (Muller, 1858)

= Amphilonche elongata =

Species of marine microorganisms

Amphilonche elongata is a species in the protistan class Acantharia, a group of marine microorganisms belonging to the Rhizaria supergroup. Acantharians are characterized by their intricate celestine skeletons or "tests". Because of these structures' fragility and proclivities to dissolve in preserved samples, much information is still to be learned about A. elongata including how they are physiologically and energetically able to form and maintain their dense tests.

== Taxonomy and evolution ==
A. elongata is a sister group to Phyllostaurus siculus, as determined by 18S rDNA sequencing. Both species belong to Acantharia's clade F, which is classified through their morphological traits, vertical distribution, and reproductive strategies. However, at least two distinct ribotypes have been identified in A. elongata, and three subspecies have been described. This information suggesting genetic diversity and/or potential cryptic speciation should be an area of future research.

== Morphology ==
The species' latin name elongata refers to the organism's elongated shape. A single spine is found on each distal end of the central capsular shell. This shell is observed as smooth in texture and with invisible pores throughout. In the middle are sets of longer primary and shorter secondary spicules and, within the periplasmic cortex, are up to two dozen myonemes for organisms in this genus. These structures are contractile and could be potentially used for locomotion or prey capture.

== Distribution ==
This is a common and cosmopolitan species in both neritic (coastal) and oceanic (open ocean) regions with abundances that appear to peak in spring and reach its lowest numbers off the coast in summer and autumn.

Amphilonche elongata has been found in both the epipelagic 0–200 m (0–656 ft) and, in younger developmental stages, the upper mesopelagic 200–500 m (660–1,640 ft). Their absence at greater depths is possibly due to lack of survival below the oxygen minimum zone and/or a physiological need to retain algal endosymbionts which limit them to the photic zone. Additionally, vertical niche partitioning has been documented in acantharian species, suggesting competition may also drive distribution in the water column.

== Ecology ==
Clade E and F acantharians are those that diverged more recently, have rigid skeletons, and tightly joined spicules. Because of their morphology, they reproduce via instant "swarmers" in contrast to the other groups which develop cysts that sink into the lower mesopelagic before releasing the swarmer cells. These adaptations are each associated with the presence of photosynthetic symbiotic microalgae. A. elongata is exclusively witnessed with Phaeocystis endosymbionts.
