= Chrysochromulina elegans =

Scientific classification
- Domain: Eukaryota
- Clade: Haptista
- Division: Haptophyta
- Class: Prymnesiophyceae
- Order: Prymnesiales
- Family: Chrysochromulinaceae
- Genus: Chrysochromulina
- Species: C. elegans

Binomial name
- Chrysochromulina elegans Estep, Davis, Hargraves & Sieburth 1984

Species of single-celled organism

Chrysochromulina elegans is a species of haptophytes. It is found in Baltic Sea in Europe and in Brazil in South America.
