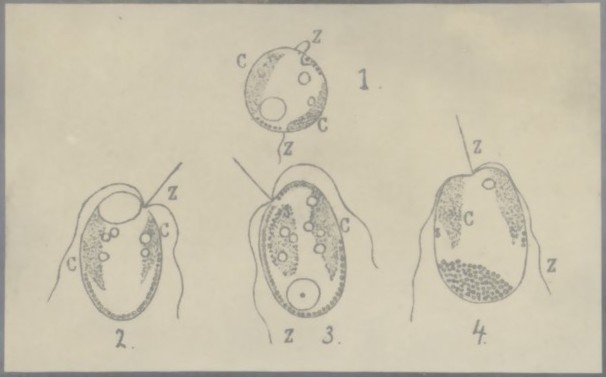
- Illustration

Scientific classification
- Domain: Eukaryota
- Supergroup: Haptista
- Division: Haptophyta
- Class: Prymnesiophyceae
- Order: Prymnesiales
- Family: Prymnesiaceae
- Genus: Prymnesium; Massart, 1920 emend. Edvardsen, Eikrem & Probert, 2011

= Prymnesium =

Genus of single-celled organisms

Prymnesium is a genus of haptophytes, including the species Prymnesium parvum. The genus is a unicellular motile alga. It is ellipsoidal in shape one flagellum is straight and there are two longer ones which enable movement.

The name Latinizes the Greek prymnēsion ‘cable (for mooring)’, from prymna ‘stern’, from prymnos ‘hindmost’.

Prymnesium was likely first recognized and drawn (although not named as such) on July 1, 1920, and then (seemingly independently) officially named shortly afterwards on July 6, 1920.

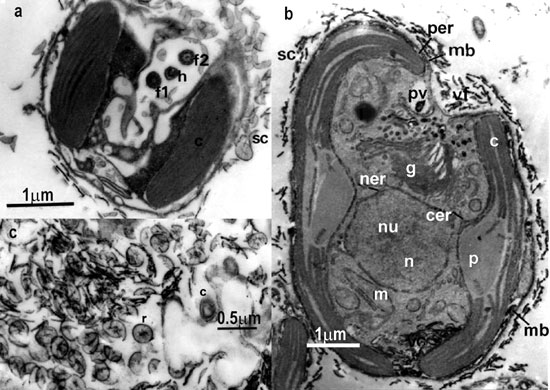
P. parvum f. patelliferum. Electron microscopy. a) Transversal section showing the f1,f2: flagella, h: haptonema, c: chloroplast, sc: surface of the cell covered with scales. b) Longitudinal section showing: c: (complex) chloroplasts, cer: chloroplasts endoplasmic reticulum, vf: vestibular fossa/cavity, per: periplastidial endoplasmatic reticulum, n: nucleus, nu: nucleolus, ner: nuclear endoplasmic reticulum, m: mitochondria, p: pyrenoids, g: Golgi body, mb: muciferous body (extrusome, pv: pulsatile/contractile vacuole, sc: scales. c) r: radial and c: concentrical scales.

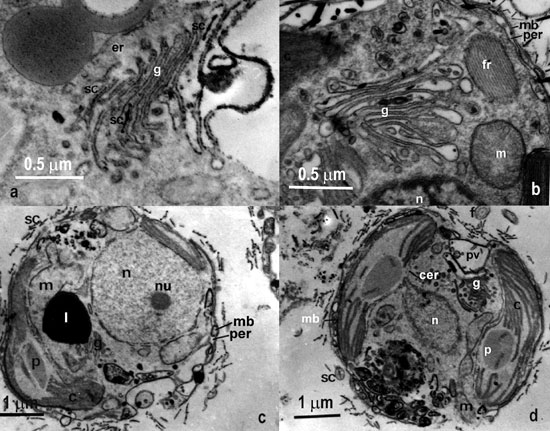
P. parvum f. patelliferum. Electron microscopy. a) sc: scale forming in the g: Golgi body, er: endoplasmic reticulum. b) g: Golgi body just below the fr: flagellar root, m: mitochondrion, n: nucleus, mb: muciferous body, cytoplasm surrounded by a narrow peripheral cisterna of per: endoplasmic reticulum. c) Transversal section showing peripheral cisterna of per: endoplasmic reticulum, n: nucleus, nu: nucleolus, m: mitochondrion, l: lipidic globules, mb: muciferous body, and sc: scales. d) Transversal section showing cer: chloroplast endoplasmic reticulum is continuous with the nucleus endoplasmic reticulum. c: chloroplast, g: Golgi body, f: flagella, p: pyrenoids, n: nucleus, pv: pulsatil vacuole, mb: muciferous body, and sc: scales.

== Species ==
The taxonomy of Prymnesiales was revised in 2011. With this revision, ten additional species were added to the genus, namely P. neolepis (previously assigned to Hyalolithus), P. palpebrale, P. polylepis, P. kappa, P. chiton, P. minus (previously assigned to Chrysochromulina), P. neustophilum, P. pienaarii, P. pigrum, and P. simplex (previously assigned to Platychrysis).

- Prymnesium neolepis (M. Yoshida, M.-H. Noël, T. Nakayama, T. Naganuma & I. Inouye, 2006) Edvardsen, Eikrem & Probert, 2011 (=Hyalolithus neolepis)
- Prymnesium palpebrale (Seoane, Eikrem, Edvardsen & Pienaar, 2009) Edvardsen, Eikrem & Probert, 2011 (=Chrysochromulina palpebralis)
- Prymnesium polylepis (Manton & Parke, 1962) Edvardsen, Eikrem & Probert, 2011 (=Chrysochromulina polylepis)
- Prymnesium kappa (Parke & Manton, 1955) Edvardsen, Eikrem & Probert, 2011 (=Chrysochromulina kappa)
- Prymnesium chiton (Parke & Manton, 1958) Edvardsen, Eikrem & Probert, 2011 (=Chrysochromulina chiton)
- Prymnesium minus (Parke & Manton, 1955) Edvardsen, Eikrem & Probert, 2011 (=Chrysochromulina minor)
- Prymnesium neustophilum (R.E. Norris, 1967) Edvardsen, Eikrem & Probert, 2011 (=Platychrysis neustophila)
- Prymnesium pienaarii (Gayral & Fresnel, 1983) Edvardsen, Eikrem & Probert, 2011 (=Platychrysis pienaarii)
- Prymnesium pigrum (Geitler, 1930) Edvardsen, Eikrem & Probert, 2011 (=Platychrysis pigra)
- Prymnesium simplex (Gayral & Fresnel, 1983) Edvardsen, Eikrem & Probert, 2011 (=Platychrysis simplex)
