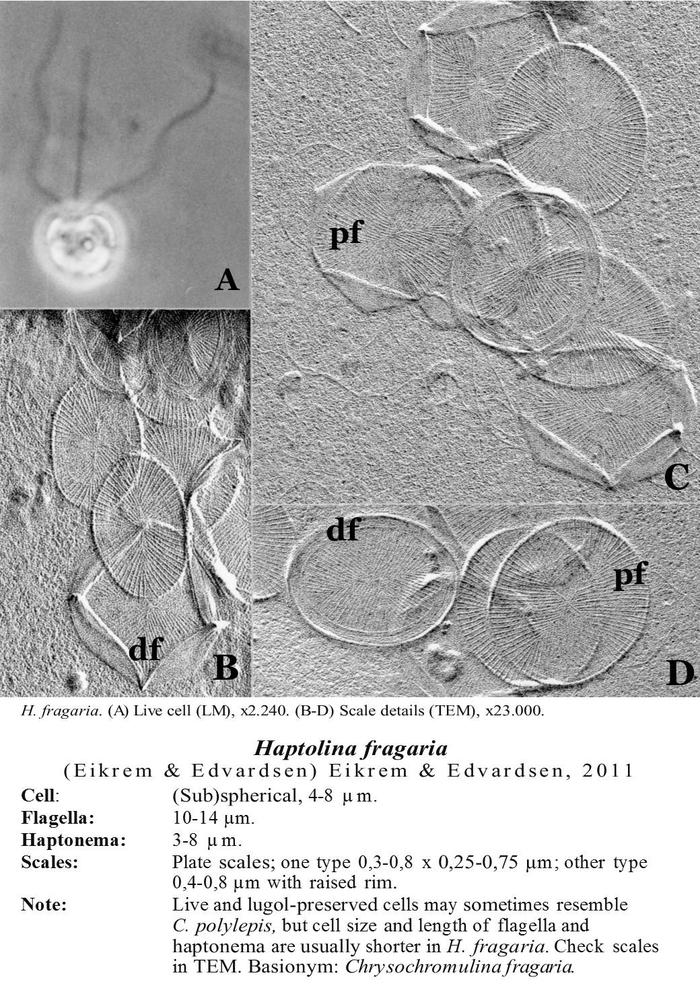
- Haptolina fragaria

Scientific classification
- Domain: Eukaryota
- Division: Haptophyta
- Class: Prymnesiophyceae
- Order: Prymnesiales
- Family: Prymnesiaceae
- Genus: Haptolina; Edvardsen & Eikrem, 2011

= Haptolina =

Genus of algae

Haptolina is a genus of haptophytes belonging to the family Prymnesiaceae.

The genus has cosmopolitan distribution.

Species:

- Haptolina brevifila (Parke & Manton) Edvardsen & Eikrem
- Haptolina ericina (Parke & Manton) Edvardsen & Eikrem
- Haptolina fragaria (Eikrem & Edvardsen) Edvardsen & Eikrem
- Haptolina herdlensis (B.Leadb.) Edvardsen & Eikrem
- Haptolina hirta (Manton) Edvardsen & Eikrem
