= Rebecca (protist) =

Scientific classification
- Domain: Eukaryota
- Division: Haptophyta
- Class: Pavlovophyceae
- Order: Pavlovales
- Family: Pavlovaceae
- Genus: Rebecca; Green, 2000

Species
- R. salina; R. helicata; R. billiardiae

Genus of algae

Rebecca is a genus of photosynthetic, flagellated marine haptophytes. It is one of four genera in the family Pavlovaceae. The holotype species, R. salina, was described in 2000 by J.C. Green; it is one of three species currently accepted in the genus. Also in the genus is R. helicata, which was described in the same publication as R. salina, and the third member is R. billiardiae, which was described in 2023. R. helicata and R. salina were both previously considered to be within the genus Pavlova.

== Etymology ==
Rebecca was named by J.C. Green after his daughter, Rebecca Jane Victoria Green.

== Type species ==
The type species is R. salina.

== Taxonomy ==
The genus Rebecca was formed following a phylogenetic review of Haptophyta by Edvardsen et al. in 2000, and then confirmed by Bendif et al. in 2011. In 2023, it was slightly revised to include the newly described species R. billiardiae. It contains mainly taxa that were previously classified in other closely related groups, until a genetic and morphological comparison was performed; in particular, it contains several species that were previously classified under the genus Pavlova.

R. salina has been passed around through several genera - it was originally classified as Nephrochloris salina in 1936. In 1969, it was moved to the genus Pavlova by van der Veer under the name Pavlova mesolychnon. Similarly, R. helicata was previously classified as P. helicata by van der Veer in 1969. Both species were then moved into Rebecca in 2000.

In 2023, R. billiardiae was described directly within the genus Rebecca following analysis of a previously unnamed culture.

== Habitat and ecology ==
Rebecca is a marine component of phytoplankton, and it has a cosmopolitan distribution. Cells seem to favor brackish, muddy, or turbulent waters, especially saltwater estuaries with lots of nearby vegetation.

Like other haptophytes, Rebecca is primarily photosynthetic.

== Description ==
Rebecca cells are solitary, free-swimming, and elongated to round or angular/cubic, with one shorter and one longer flagellum. They may be immobile at certain stages. The cell body is covered in tiny cylindrical, knob-shaped or club-shaped scales. Rebecca has a single, yellow-green to golden-brown chloroplast, which may be divided into two lobes.

Both the anterior and posterior flagella are situated anteriorly, inserted within a recessed pit near the tip of the cell. They can be covered in a fluffy or knobby layer of projections. The longer flagellum is the primary means of locomotion, while the shorter flagellum is vestigial. As a haptophyte, Rebecca has the characteristic haptonema, a filiform appendage which may play a role in feeding or anchoring to substrate; this haptonema is relatively short and is inserted between the flagella.

Noticeably, Rebecca cells do not have a pyrenoid, and their thylakoids are helicoidal and parallel; this is generally a consistent way to distinguish Rebecca from the other three genera of Pavlovaceae. Their reduced posterior flagellum and bilobed chloroplast are also identifiable shared traits. R. billiardiae can have a unique angular to cubic shape, especially when it is in a less motile and more metabolic state. It has a single golden-brown chloroplast divided into two lobes. Its longer anterior flagellum is strongly S-shaped. Despite the shorter anterior flagellum being strongly reduced, it has a distinctly beaded filopodium which branches near the base; its curved haptonema shares this beaded appearance on its distal half.

Unlike other Rebecca species, no colonial arrangement has been observed. Not much is known about the life cycle of Rebecca. In response to environmental stress, cells may enter an immobile state, curling its anterior flagellum around the cell body.

== List of species ==
As accepted by Algaebase:

- R. salina
- R. helicata
- R. billiardiae
