= Diacronema =

Scientific classification
- Domain: Eukaryota
- Clade: Haptista
- Division: Haptophyta
- Class: Pavlovophyceae
- Order: Pavlovales
- Family: Pavlovaceae
- Genus: Diacronema; Prauser, 1958

Species
- Diacronema vlkianum Prauser; Diacronema lutheri Droop

Genus of single-celled organisms

Diacronema is a genus of haptophytes.

It includes the species Diacronema vlkianum.

The Diacronema genus also includes the marine alga Diacronema lutheri. D. lutheri is a flagellated mobile microalga. It has two apical flagella of different lengths and a haptonema. D.lutheri is capable of producing a large amount of polyunsaturated fatty acids, especially eicosapentaenoic acid (EPA) and docosahexaenoic acid (DHA). This characteristic is therefore widely used to feed bivalve molluscs, crustaceans and fish.
