= Mennerius =

Scientific classification
- Domain: Eukaryota
- (unranked): Haptophyta
- Class: Prymnesiophyceae
- Family: Lapideacassaceae
- Genus: Mennerius Luljeva, 1967

Synonyms
- Lapideacassis Black, 1971; Scampanella Forchheimer & Stradner, 1973; Pervilithus Crux, 1981

Genus of single-celled organisms

Mennerius is a genus of haptophytes belonging to the family Lapideacassaceae.

== Diagnosis ==
The genus accommodates ‘bell-shaped’ to cylindrical nannoliths with their body consisting of one or more tiers of vertically elongated calcite plates and a rounded or somewhat pointed apical cone. One or more apical spines are often also present. The cross section of the body is round to polygonal.

== Species ==
- M. asymmetricus (Perch-Nielsen in Perch-Nielsen & Franz, 1977)
- M. bispinosus (Perch-Nielsen in Perch-Nielsen & Franz, 1977)
- M. blackii (Perch-Nielsen in Perch-Nielsen & Franz, 1977)
- M. cornutus (Forchheimer & Stradner, 1973)
- M. glans (Black, 1971)
- M. longus Luljeva, 1967
- M. magnificus (Perch-Nielsen in Perch-Nielsen & Franz, 1977)
- M. mariae (Black, 1971)
- M. morosus Luljeva, 1967
- M. tricornus (Wind & Wise in Wise & Wind, 1977)
- M. trispinus (Perch-Nielsen in Perch-Nielsen & Franz, 1977)
- M. varius (Crux, 1981)
- M. wisei (Perch-Nielsen in Perch-Nielsen & Franz, 1977)

== Distribution ==
The species of the genus occur sporadically but widely in the uppermost Lower and Upper Cretaceous and Palaeogene sediments in the Northern Hemisphere, South Atlantic, South Africa, Indian Ocean and Australia.
