= Exanthemachrysis =

Scientific classification
- Domain: Eukaryota
- Clade: Diaphoretickes
- Phylum: Haptista
- Subphylum: Haptophytina
- Class: Pavlovophyceae
- Order: Pavlovales
- Family: Pavlovaceae
- Genus: Exanthemachrysis; H.Lepailleur, 1970

Genus of single-celled organisms

Exanthemachrysis is a genus of haptophytes.

It includes the species Exanthemachrysis gayraliae.
