= Prymnesin-2 =

Names
- IUPAC name (11S)-1-[(2R,3R,4R,5S,6R)-6-[(2R,3S,4R,4aR,6R,8aR)-6-[(2R,3S,4aR,6S,8R,8aS)-6-[(2R,3R,4aR,6S,8R, 8aR)-6-[(2S,3S,4aS,6R,8aR)-2-[(1S,3R,5S,7S,10S,12R,14S,16S,21R,22R)-7-[(1Z,3Z,6R,8Z,10Z,18Z)-6-amino-19-chlorononadeca-1,3,8,10,18-pentaen-12,16-diynyl]-22-hydroxy-2,6,11,15,20-pentaoxapentacyclo[12.9.0.0^{3,12}.0^{5,10}.0^{16,21}]tricosan-19-yl]-3-methyl-2,3,4,4a,6,7,8,8a-octahydropyrano[3,2-b]pyran-2-yl]-8-chloro-3-hydroxy-2,3,4,4a,6,7,8,8a-octahydropyrano[3,2-b]pyran-2-yl]-11-chloro-3-[(2R,3R,4S,5R)-3,4-dihydroxy-5-(hydroxymethyl)oxolan-2-yl]oxyhexadeca-13,15-diyne-2,4,6,7,8,9,10-heptol
- Other names PRM2

Identifiers
CAS Number	168010-52-4
3D model (JSmol)	Interactive image
ChemSpider	8971965
PubChem CID	102510995
CompTox Dashboard (EPA)	DTXSID10880113
- InChI: InChI=1S/C96H136Cl3NO35/c1-3-4-15-23-47(98)75(109)79(113)80(114)76(110)49(102)35-50(103)88(135-96-85(119)78(112)74(43-101)132-96)51(104)38-70-77(111)81(115)82(116)94(131-70)95-84(118)83(117)93-62(130-95)31-30-61(129-93)90-54(107)39-72-87(133-90)48(99)34-71(126-72)91-55(108)40-73-92(134-91)53(106)36-64(125-73)57-26-27-58-63(121-57)33-44(2)86(127-58)59-28-29-60-89(128-59)52(105)37-65-67(123-60)42-68-69(124-65)41-66-56(122-68)25-24-46(120-66)22-18-14-17-21-45(100)20-16-12-10-8-6-5-7-9-11-13-19-32-97/h1,8,10,12,14,16-19,22,32,44-96,101-119H,7,9,20-21,23-31,33-43,100H2,2H3/b10-8+,16-12+,17-14+,22-18+,32-19+/t44-,45+,46+,47-,48+,49?,50?,51?,52+,53+,54-,55+,56-,57+,58+,59?,60-,61?,62+,63-,64?,65-,66-,67-,68+,69+,70+,71?,72+,73+,74+,75?,76?,77-,78+,79?,80?,81+,82-,83+,84-,85+,86-,87+,88?,89+,90+,91+,92+,93-,94?,95+,96+/m0/s1 Key: WCHCDYFGLWOFCV-GUPVPWLLSA-N
- SMILES: C[C@H]1C[C@]2([H])O[C@@H](C3C[C@H]([C@@]4([H])O[C@@H](C5C[C@H]([C@@]6([H])O[C@@H](C7CC[C@@]8([H])O[C@@H](C9O[C@@H]([C@@H]([C@H]([C@@H]9O)O)O)CC(C(C(CC(C(C(C(C([C@H](CC#CC#C)Cl)O)O)O)O)O)O)O[C@H]%10O[C@@H]([C@H]([C@H]%10O)O)CO)O)[C@H]([C@H]([C@@]8([H])O7)O)O)[C@H](C[C@@]6([H])O5)O)Cl)[C@@H](C[C@@]4([H])O3)O)O)CC[C@@]2([H])O[C@@H]1C%11CC[C@]%12([H])O[C@@]%13([H])C[C@@]%14([H])O[C@@]%15([H])CC[C@@H](/C=C/C=C/C[C@@H](C/C=C/C=C/C#CCCC#C/C=C/Cl)N)O[C@@]%15([H])C[C@@]%14([H])O[C@@]%13([H])C[C@H]([C@@]%12([H])O%11)O

Properties
Chemical formula	C_{96}H_{136}Cl_{3}NO_{35}
Molar mass	1970.47 g·mol^{−1}
- Except where otherwise noted, data are given for materials in their standard state (at 25 °C [77 °F], 100 kPa). Infobox references

Prymnesin-2 is an organic compound that is secreted by the haptophyte Prymnesium parvum. It belongs to the prymnesin family and has potent hemolytic and ichthyotoxic properties. In a purified form it appears as a pale yellow solid. P. parvum is responsible for red harmful algal blooms worldwide, causing massive fish killings. When these algal blooms occur, this compound poses a threat to the local fishing industry. This is especially true for brackish water, as the compound can reach critical concentrations more easily.

== Structure and reactivity ==
The structural formula of prymnesin-2 is: C_{96}H_{136}Cl_{3}NO_{35}. The compound exhibits multiple chiral centers. The molecule is amphoteric, which means that it can act both as base and an acid. This is because all 16 hydroxyls, except for one at C32, are concentrated on carbons C48-84, and there α-L-xylofuranose moiety at C77. This might lead to interaction with biomembranes, which is thought to be the basis of its toxicity. The difference between prymnesin-1 and prymnesin-2 is the glycosidic residues: L-arabinose, D-galactose and D-ribose, yet prymnesin-2 and prymnesin-1 show comparable activities. Prymnesins also have unique features: The possession of only one methyl, but three chlorine atoms, four C-C triple bonds, sugars and an amino group.

=== Biosynthesis ===
Prymnesin-1 and prymnesin-2 are both are derived from acetate-related (i.e. polyketide) metabolism, based on knowledge about the structure of the prymnesins. In general primary and secondary metabolites such as fatty acids, polyketides and non-ribosomal peptides are synthesised by the acetate pathway. In 2024 the backbone of A-type prymnesins like prymnesin-2 was reported to be made by giant polyketide synthase enzymes dubbed the "PKZILLAs".

== Mechanism of action ==
The mechanism of action of prymnesin-2 remains to be determined. Prymnesin-2 and prymnesin-1 show comparable activities. Prymnesin-2 has shown multiple functionalities, such as potent hemolytic activity and diverse biological activities, such as mouse lethality, ichthyotoxicity and activity inducing Ca^{+}_{2} influx into cultured cells. The hemolytic potency of prymnesin-2 exceeds that of plant saponin by 50,000 times.

Prymnesin-2 causes hemolysis by direct interaction between toxin and cell surface. Partly due to interaction with cellular lipids, mainly to interaction with a specific binding site on the blood cell surface. This is supported by the observation of competitive inhibition by the prymnesin-2 analogues, which assume the presence of a specific binding site on the blood cell surface. Also the process of toxin molecule aggregation may be involved in the main mechanism of the haemolytic activity.

== Toxicity ==
Prymnesin-2 is an ichthyotoxic compound with the ability to hemolyze blood. 2.5 nM is needed for a 50% hemolysis rate of a 1% rat blood cell suspension, and 9 nM is enough for killing freshwater fish. The hemolytic and ichthyotoxic properties increase when the pH of the solution rises from 7 to 8. Prymnesin-2 causes calcium ion influx into C6 rat glioma cells at a concentration of 70 nM.

Besides the lytic effect on blood cells, hepatocytes, Hela cells and artificial liposomes are affected by prymnesin-2.

As seen in the table below, prymnesin-2 is highly hemolytic for blood cells of different animal species, even when compared to the already highly hemolytic toxin saponin.

Table1. Sensitivities of blood cells from different animal species
	Prymnesin-2 (nM)	Saponin (nM)	Relative to saponin
Mouse	2.5	17000	6800
Rabbit	1.7	15000	8800
Dog	0.5	25000	50000
Sheep	0.6	23000	38000
Chicken	1.9	17000	8900
Carp	1.6	11500	7200

== Effects on animals ==
In the US, the first recorded P. parvum bloom occurred in 1985 in a semi-arid region of the country (Pecos River, Texas). Since then, the incidence of P. parvum blooms dramatically increased in the US, where the organism has invaded lakes and rivers throughout southern regions and most recently into northern regions. The magnitude of P. parvum blooms are also increasing over the past decade compared to 30 years ago, with massive fish killings as result.

== See also ==
- Prymnesin-1
- Prymnesin-B1
