= 2022 Oder environmental disaster =

Fish kill in Central Europe

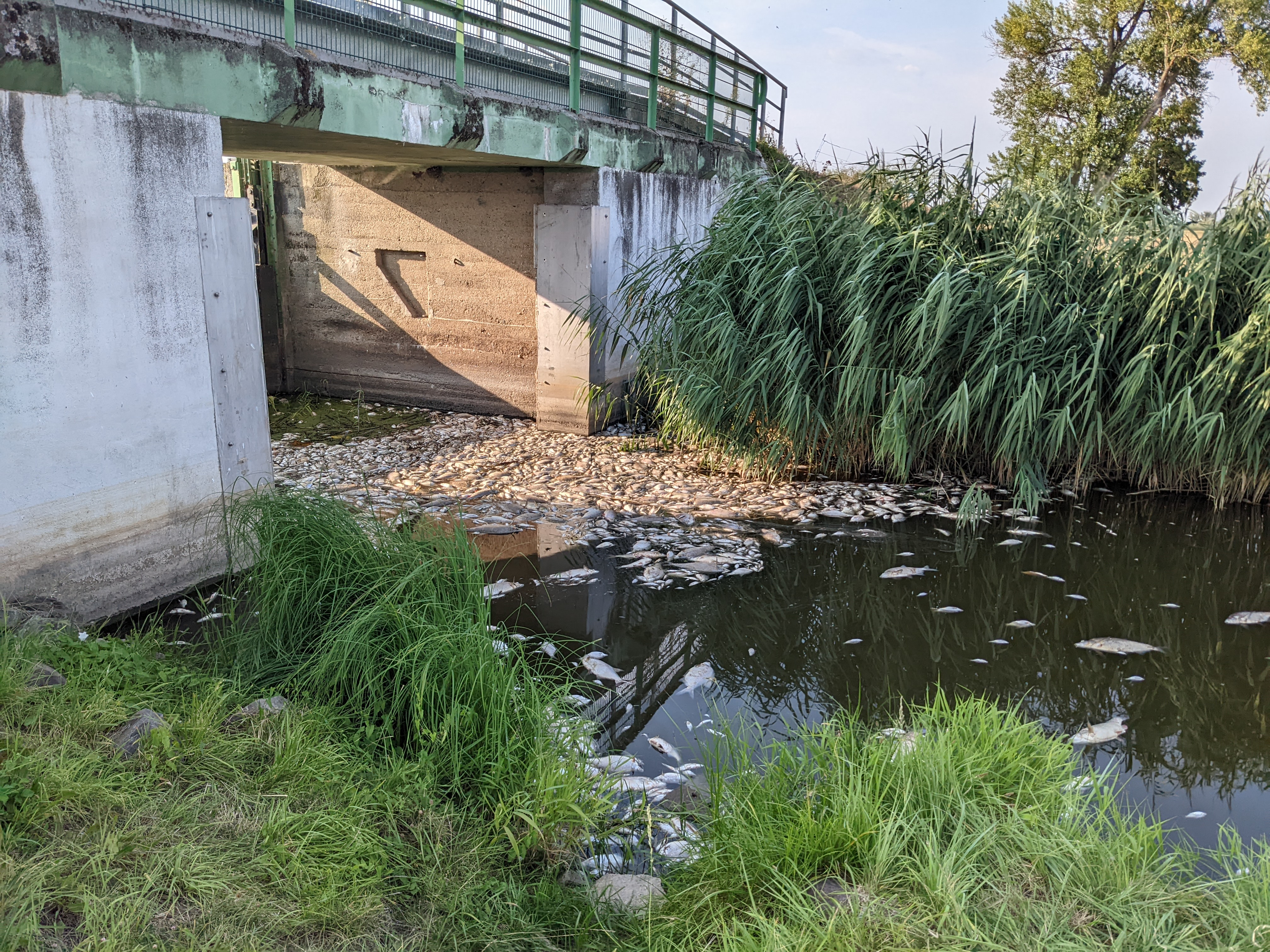
- Dead fish in the Oder river on the border between Germany and Poland
- Date: July–August 2022
- Location: Oder
- Type: Environmental disaster
- Cause: Harmful algal bloom of Prymnesium parvum

During the summer of 2022, a mass mortality event involving fish, beavers, clams, crayfish and other wildlife occurred in the Oder river.

Over 100 tonnes of dead fish were removed from the Polish section of the river, and a further 35 tonnes from German sections, causing concern that the water was poisoned.

At first the cause was not clear, theories included the effects of the summer heat and lower water levels due to the European drought, reduced oxygen levels due to the heat and nutrient loading, a spike in oxygen levels due to the introduction of an oxidizing agent, and pollution by chemicals including mercury, mesitylene, salts or other sewage, as well as the possibility of an algal bloom. It was later determined that an algal bloom, which was made possible by the discharge of saline industrial wastewater into the river on the Polish side, is the probable cause of the disaster.

The Polish authorities were slow to react, causing a scandal and resulting in the dismissal of officials responsible for water management and environmental protection. A reward of 1 million zlotys (about €222,000, as of September 2023) was offered for information about possible culprits.

== Background ==
The Oder flows through the city of Ostrava, across the Czech–Polish border, terminates the Gliwice Canal, passes through Lower Silesia including the city of Wrocław, and farther forms the German–Polish border until it flows into the Baltic Sea. It is engineered to carry heavy barge traffic.

Decades ago, the Oder river was extremely polluted before reaching Wrocław due to the heavy industrialization in Ostrava, Upper Silesia (connected through the Canal and the Kłodnica river having many large coal mines around), and Lower Silesia. Large chemical factories are in Kędzierzyn-Koźle at the Canal. Europe's largest coke (fuel) plant is located in Zdzieszowice just above Opole. Nowa Ruda (the 21st most polluted city in the European Union in 2015) with another coal mine lies in the mountains in the basin of Eastern Neisse, another of Oder's tributaries. The Jelcz factory is located near Oława just above Wrocław while a chemical plant - just below in Brzeg Dolny. Further west of Wrocław, in the basin of the Kaczawa tributary, lies Legnica with large copperworks KGHM and factories, whereas copper ore is mined in nearby Lubin. In the basin of the Bystrzyca (Oder) tributary, south of Legnica, there is the sizable city of Wałbrzych with more coal mines, a coke plant, chemical and textile factories, which use chemical dyes and large amounts of water. In the basin of the Lusatian Neisse tributary, along which the Polish-German border is extended south of Oder, and south of Görlitz, lies the Turów Coal Mine supplying the nearby Turów Power Station with lignite often containing toxic heavy metals and sulfur.

As recently as 2012, the Oder transported over 100 tonnes of heavy metals in its waters into the Baltic Sea.

== Discovery ==
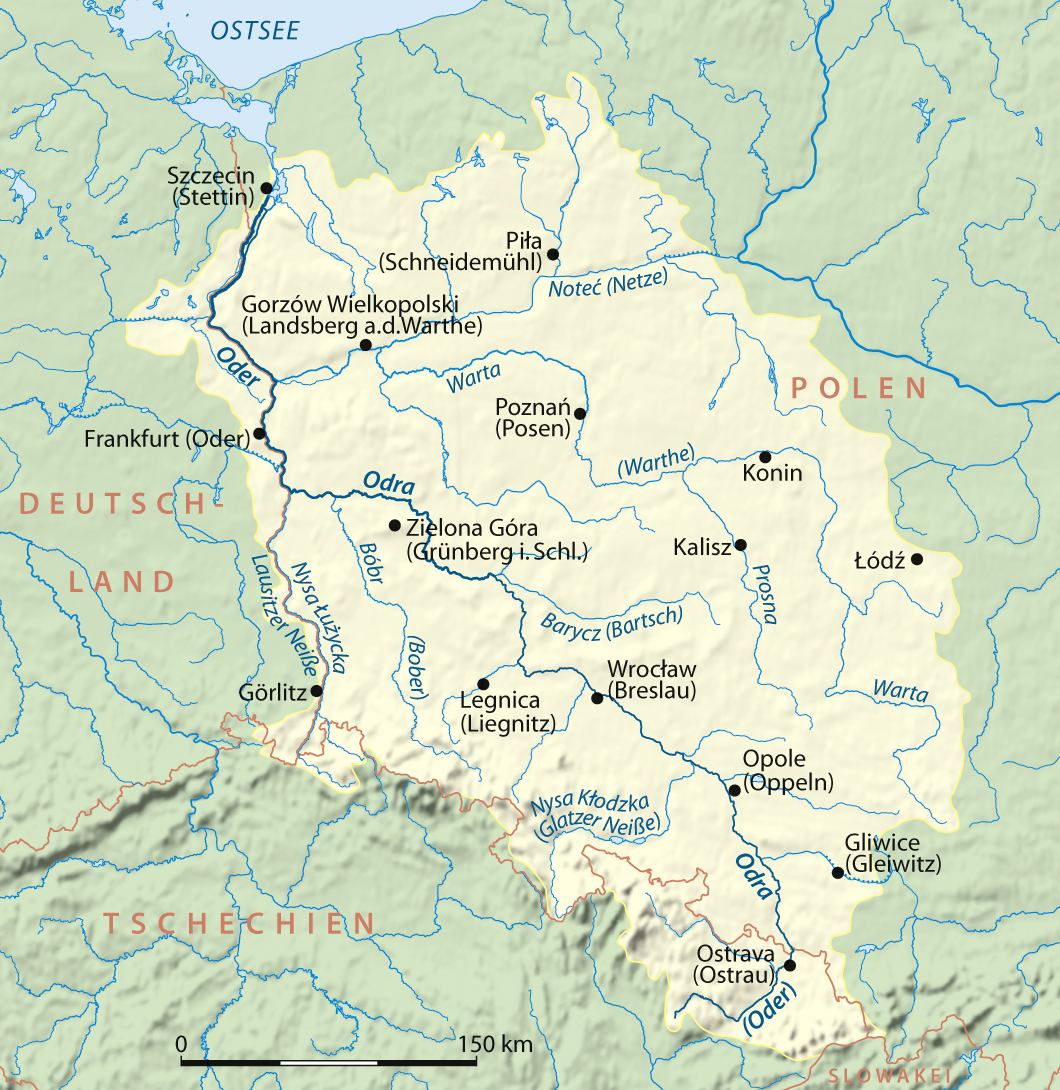
The Oder drains a basin of 119,074 km^{2} (45,975 sq mi) in Czechia, Poland and Germany

Fish die-offs were reported by anglers around Oława as early as March 2022. Large die-offs then started again at the end of July 2022. On 11 August 2022, volunteers and anglers removed at least 10 tonnes of dead fish from the 200 km (120 mi) stretch of the river north of Oława in southwest Poland. The discovery was made by local fishermen, as opposed to any regulatory or testing body. Other dead animals included beavers and birds.

== Cause ==
Early on, it was suspected that the cause of the die-off was poisoning by an unknown toxic substance. Water samples taken on 28 July showed a high probability of the presence of the contaminant mesitylene, although the Polish government claimed that it was not present on samples taken after 1 August.

A German testing lab had found traces of mercury, but the Polish government reported that their tests determined that mercury poisoning was not the cause of the die-off. According to them, it was caused by golden algae (likely Prymnesium parvum, which prefer warm salty alkaline waters). Researchers at the Leibniz Institute for Freshwater Ecology and Inland Fisheries (IGB) have offered an interim hypothesis that the cause was golden algae.

According to the Brandenburg Environment Minister, Axel Vogel, German laboratories believe the fish deaths may have been the result of large amounts of salt in the water.

A February 2023 European Commission JRC report, which built on previous formal reports from both Germany and Poland concluded: "The direct cause of the ecological disaster in the Oder River was prymnesin toxins from Prymnesium parvum algae."

=== Water quality testing ===
Data gained via an automatic water quality measuring station in Frankfurt an der Oder (over 100 km (62 mi) downstream) indicated that from 4 August 2022 the electrical conductivity had climbed anomalously. This data also showed a large change in other water quality parameters. On 7 August 2022, dissolved oxygen, electrical conductivity, and UV absorption almost doubled; nitrate levels plummeted and chlorophyll increased by a factor of ten. The water also became more turbid and its pH increased to about 8.8–9.2. This could indicate increased levels of salt in the river, consistent with the conclusion that since 7 August 2022 a huge amount of salt reached the town. The pH changes could also support the 'Golden Algae hypothesis'.

== Implications ==
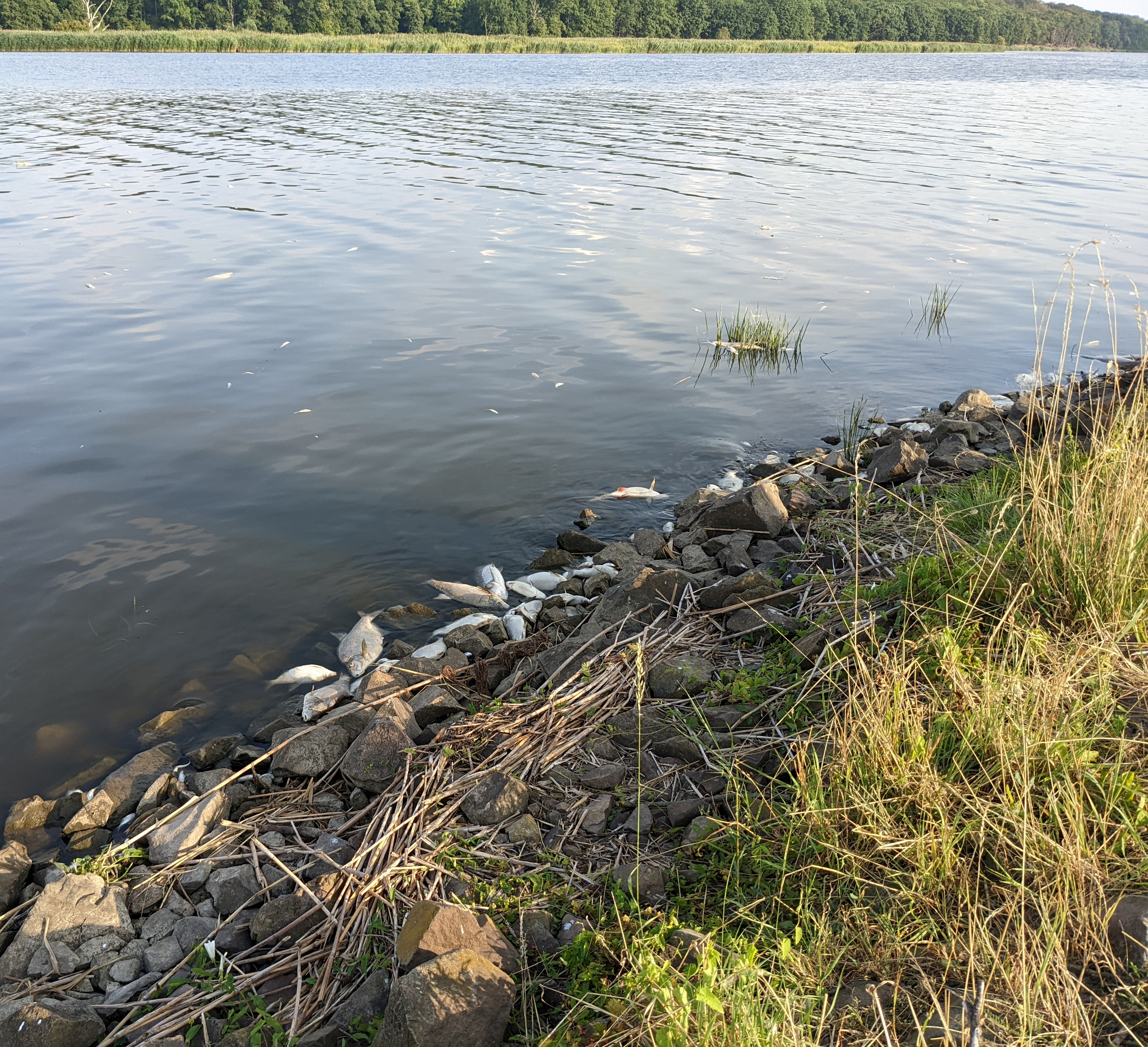
Dead fish as a result of the 2022 environmental disaster at the Oder river (13 August 2022)

The ecosystem of the river was severely damaged. Scientists are concerned that if the damage was caused by mercury poisoning, detrimental effects could be long term as mercury is a persistent heavy metal. There are also potential serious health consequences for humans.

== Reaction ==
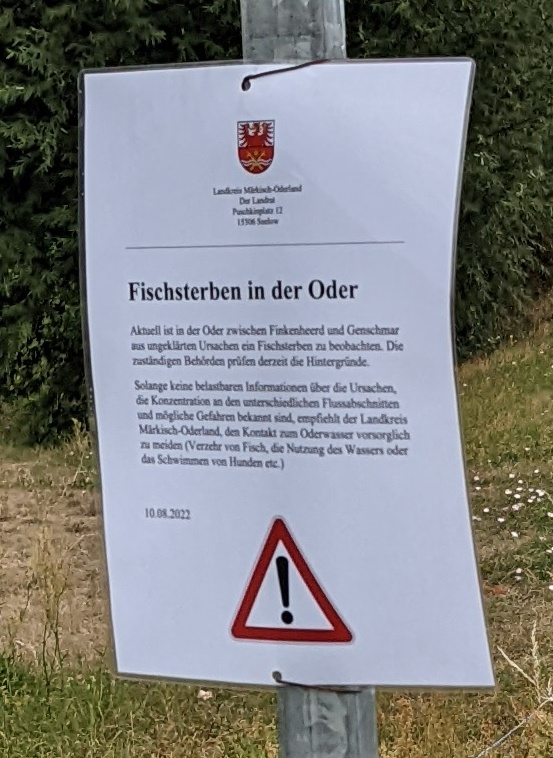
Sign about the 2022 Oder river environmental disaster.

The Prime Minister of Poland Mateusz Morawiecki was put under pressure to act and fired two government officials as a result (the head of the water authority, Państwowe Gospodarstwo Wodne Wody Polskie, Przemysław Daca, and the head of the environmental authority, Chief Inspectorate of Environmental Protection, Michał Mistrzak). This in turn caused internal rifts in the ruling Law and Justice party.

Local residents reacted negatively to the government's actions, and, with the state television avoiding reporting on the subject, widespread allegations of a government cover-up began. Criticism also fell on the local voivodes.

The Polish opposition blamed the Polish government for reacting slowly to the developing situation, and downplaying the scale of the problem. The government said the perpetrators would be severely punished, while blaming opposition politicians, in particular Donald Tusk and Rafał Trzaskowski, for exaggerating the issue. The government media has compared the situation to other previous minor and unrelated events in Warsaw and Gdańsk, where the opposition Civic Platform holds power. On 12 August, the deputy minister of infrastructure, Grzegorz Witkowski, blamed the opposition and the ecologists, and stated that the river was safe to enter, and fishing is allowed. Krystyna Pawłowicz, a Eurosceptic member of the Law and Justice party, has publicly suggested that other countries may be responsible for the contaminations.

Some anglers fear that fish might never return to the river, and Steffi Lemke, the German Federal Ministry for the Environment, Nature Conservation, Nuclear Safety and Consumer Protection, called the situation a catastrophe and a shocking ecological disaster. German officials have also complained about the lack of communication from the Polish officials.

Poles were very critical of government reactions, according to polls, in which more than 60% of responders said that they "disapprove of the government's response to the environmental disaster on the Oder River".
