= Acanthophractida =

Scientific classification
- Domain: Eukaryota
- Clade: Sar
- Clade: Rhizaria
- Phylum: Retaria
- Class: Acantharia
- Order: Acanthophractida

Order of single-celled organisms

Acanthophractida is an order of marine radiolarians in the subclass Acantharia; skeleton includes a latticework shell and skeletal rods. They have a latticework shell, which can be spherical or ovoid and fused with the skeletal rods. The shell is concentric with the central capsule. "The body is usually covered with a single or double gelatinous sheath through which the skeletal rods emerge".
