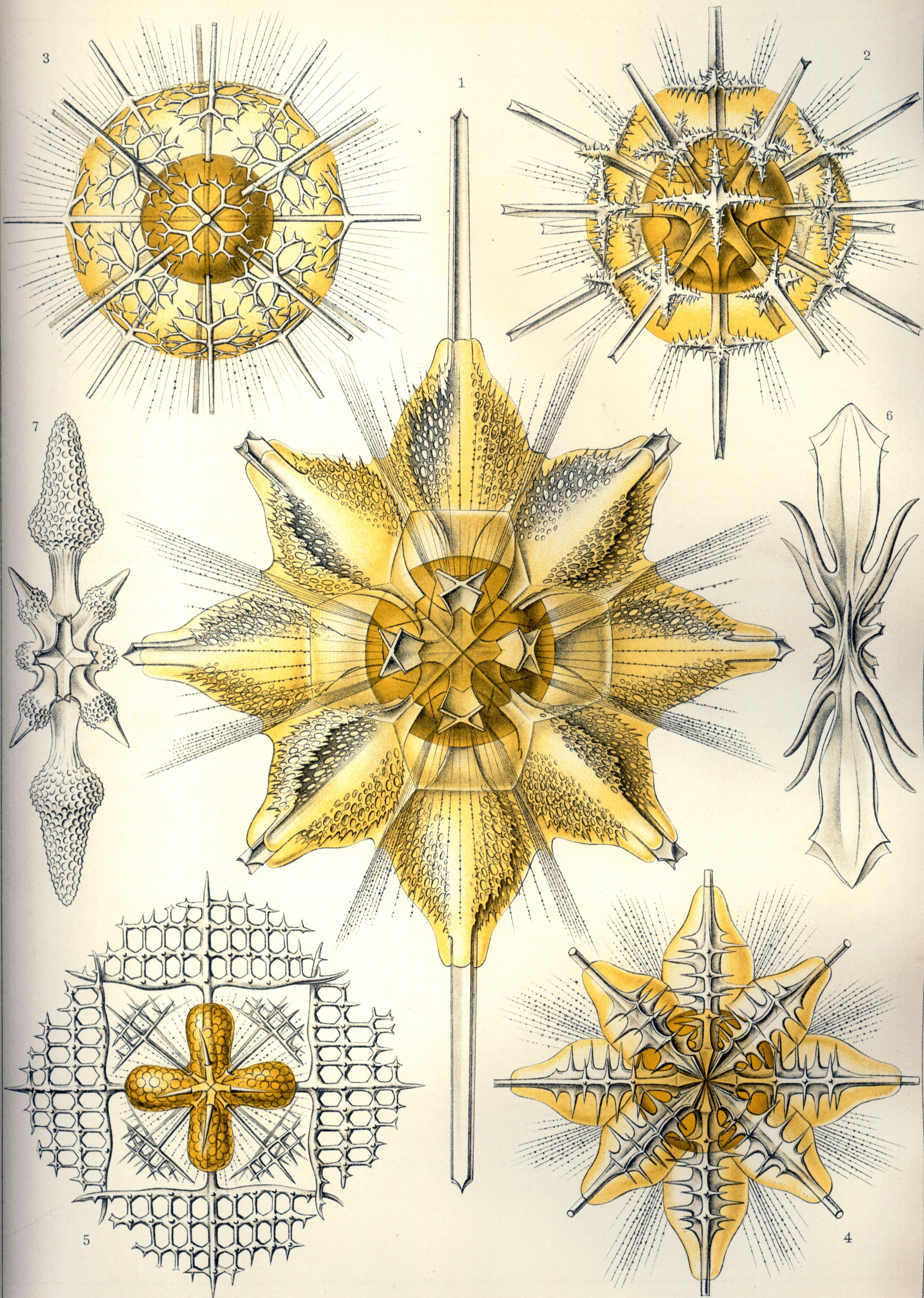
- Acantharea species

Scientific classification
- Domain: Eukaryota
- Supergroup: Rhizaria
- Phylum: Radiolaria
- Class: Acantharia; Haeckel, 1881, emend. Mikrjukov, 2000

Order
- Acanthophractida

Synonyms
- Acantharea

= Acantharia =

Class of single-celled organisms

The Acantharia are a group of radiolarian protozoa, distinguished mainly by their strontium sulfate skeletons. Acantharians are heterotrophic marine microplankton that range in size from about 200 microns in diameter up to several millimeters. Some acantharians have photosynthetic endosymbionts and hence are considered mixotrophs.

== Morphology ==
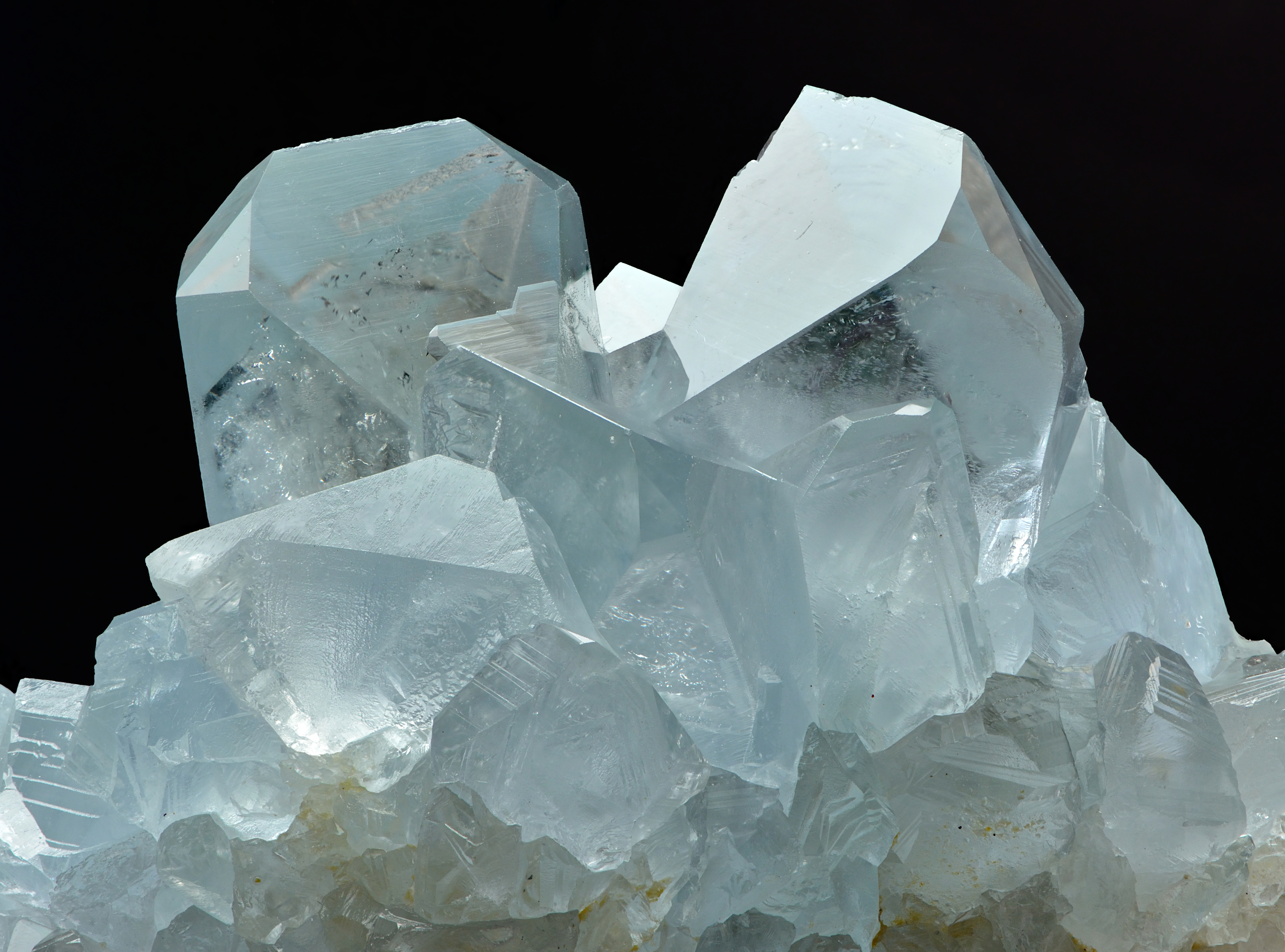
Celestine crystal

Acantharian skeletons are composed of strontium sulfate, SrSO_{4}, in the form of mineral celestine crystal. Celestine is named for the delicate blue colour of its crystals, and is the heaviest mineral in the ocean. The denseness of their celestine ensures acantharian shells function as mineral ballast, resulting in fast sedimentation to bathypelagic depths. High settling fluxes of acantharian cysts have been observed at times in the Iceland Basin and the Southern Ocean, as much as half of the total gravitational organic carbon flux.

The strontium sulfate crystals are secreted by vacuoles surrounding each spicule or spine. Acantharians are unique among marine organisms for their ability to biomineralize strontium sulfate as the main component of their skeletons. However, unlike other radiolarians whose skeletons are made of silica, acantharian skeletons do not fossilize, primarily because strontium sulfate is very scarce in seawater and the crystals dissolve after the acantharians die. The arrangement of the spines is very precise, and is described by what is called the Müllerian law in terms of lines of latitude and longitude – the spines lie on the intersections between five of the former, symmetric about an equator, and eight of the latter, spaced uniformly. Each line of longitude carries either two tropical spines or one equatorial and two polar spines, in alternation.

The cell cytoplasm is divided into two regions: the endoplasm and the ectoplasm. The endoplasm, at the core of the cell, contains the main organelles, including many nuclei, and is delineated from the ectoplasm by a capsular wall made of a microfibril mesh. In symbiotic species, the algal symbionts are maintained in the endoplasm. The ectoplasm consists of cytoplasmic extensions used for prey capture and also contains food vacuoles for prey digestion. The ectoplasm is surrounded by a periplasmic cortex, also made up of microfibrils, but arranged into twenty plates, each with a hole through which one spicule projects. The cortex is linked to the spines by contractile myonemes, which assist in buoyancy control by allowing the ectoplasm to expand and contract, increasing and decreasing the total volume of the cell.

== Taxonomy ==
The way that the spines are joined at the center of the cell varies and is one of the primary characteristics by which acantharians are classified. The skeletons are made up of either ten diametric or twenty radial spicules. Diametric spicules cross the center of the cell, whereas radial spicules terminate at the center of the cell where they either form a tight or flexible junction depending on species. Acantharians with diametric spicules or loosely attached radial spicules are able to rearrange or shed spicules and form cysts.

- Holacanthida – 10 diametric spicules, simply crossed, no central junction, capable of encystment
- Chaunacanthida – 20 radial spicules, loosely attached, capable of encystment
- Symphiacanthida – 20 radial spicules, tight central junction
- Arthracanthida – 20 radial spines, tight central junction

The morphological classification system roughly agrees with phylogenetic trees based on the alignment of ribosomal RNA genes, although the groups are mostly polyphyletic. Holacanthida seems to have evolved first and includes molecular clades A, B, and D. Chaunacanthida evolved second and includes only one molecular clade, clade C. Arthracanthida and Symphacanthida, which have the most complex skeletons, evolved most recently and constitute molecular clades E and F.

== Symbiosis ==
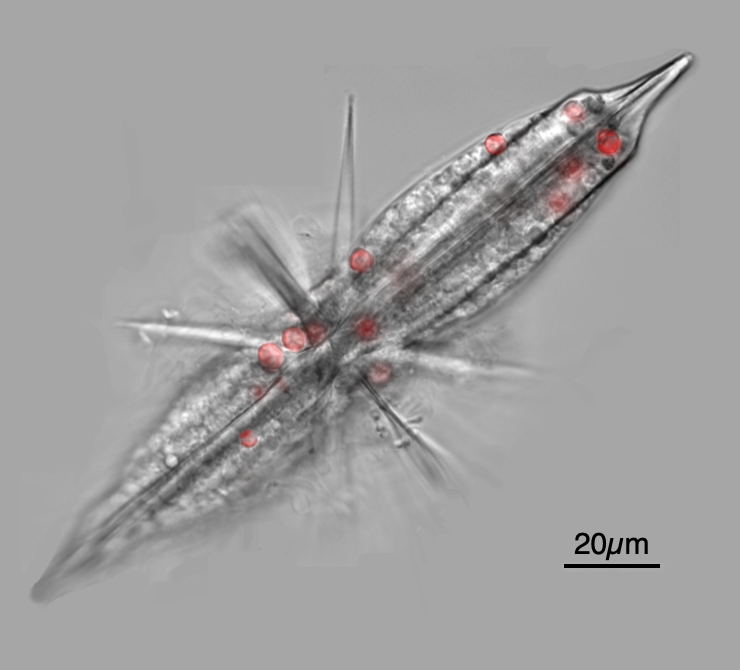
A clade F acantharian with symbionts visible in red (chlorophyll autofluorescence)

Many acantharians, including some in clade B (Holacanthida) and all in clades E & F (Symphiacanthida and Arthracanthida), host single-celled algae within their inner cytoplasm (endoplasm). By participating in this photosymbiosis, acantharians are essentially mixotrophs: they acquire energy through both heterotrophy and autotrophy. The relationship may make it possible for acantharians to be abundant in low-nutrient regions of the oceans and may also provide extra energy necessary to maintain their elaborate strontium sulfate skeletons. It is hypothesized that the acantharians provide the algae with nutrients (N & P) that they acquire by capturing and digesting prey in return for sugar that the algae produces during photosynthesis. It is not known, however, whether the algal symbionts benefit from the relationship or if they are simply being exploited and then digested by the acantharians.

Symbiotic Holacanthida acantharians host diverse symbiont assemblages, including several genera of dinoflagellates (Pelagodinium, Heterocapsa, Scrippsiella, Azadinium) and a haptophyte (Chrysochromulina). Clade E & F acantharians have a more specific symbiosis and primarily host symbionts from the haptophyte genus Phaeocystis, although they sometimes also host Chrysochromulina symbionts. Clade F acantharians simultaneously host multiple species and strains of Phaeocystis and their internal symbiont community does not necessarily match the relative availability of potential symbionts in the surrounding environment. The mismatch between internal and external symbiont communities suggests that acantharians can be selective in choosing symbionts and probably do not continuously digest and recruit new symbionts, and maintain symbionts for extended periods of time instead.

== Life cycle ==
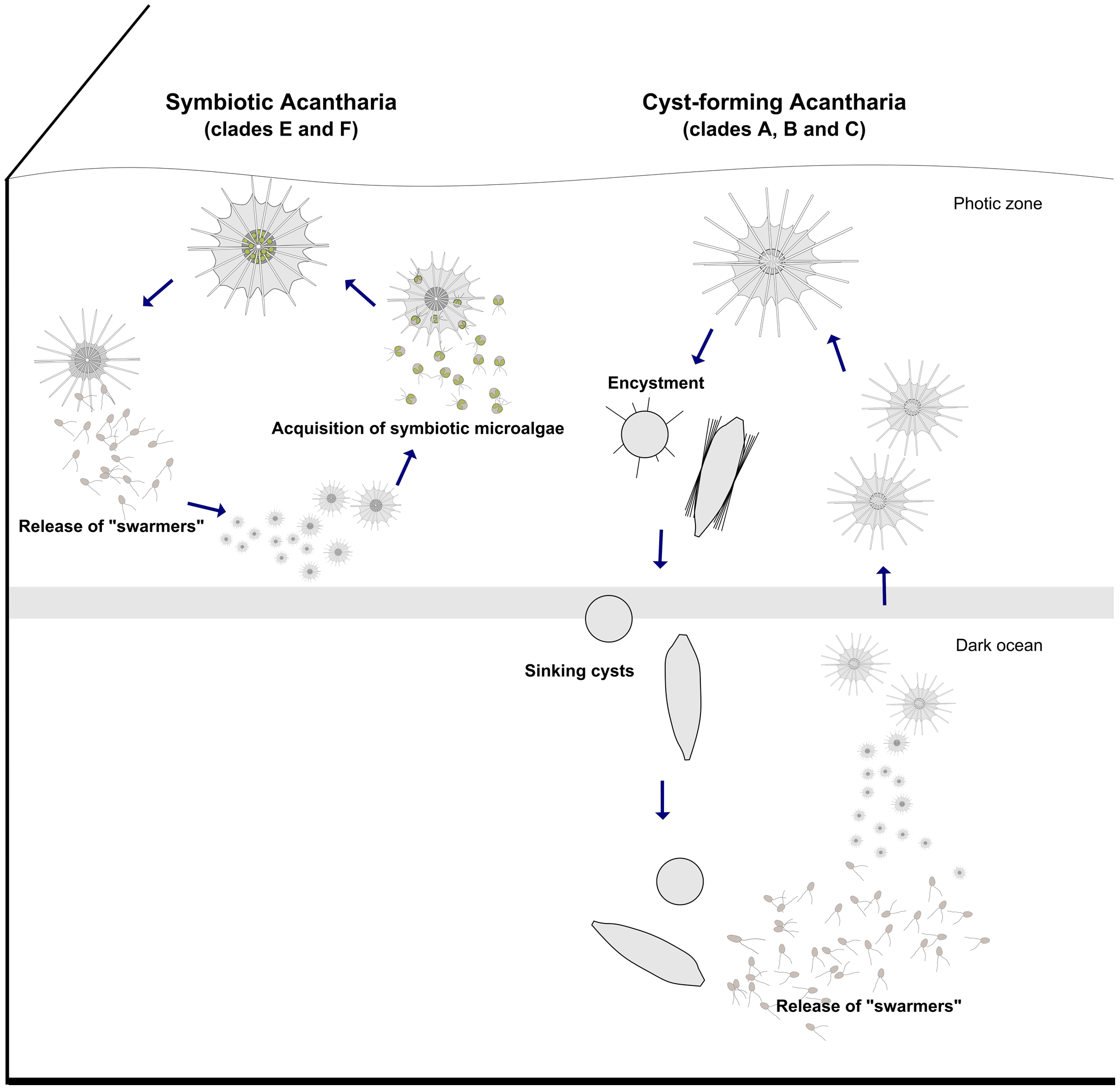
Hypothetical scenario of the life cycle in symbiotic and cyst-forming Acantharia with shallow and deep reproduction, respectively.

Adults are usually multinucleated. Earlier diverging clades are able to shed their spines and form cysts, which are often referred to as reproductive cysts. Reproduction is thought to take place by formation of swarmer cells (formerly referred to as "spores"), which may be flagellate, and cysts have been observed to release these swarmers. Non-encysted cells have also been seen releasing swarmers in laboratory conditions. Not all life cycle stages have been observed, however, and no one has witnessed the fusion of swarmers to produce a new acantharian. Cysts are often found in sediment traps and it is therefore believed that the cysts help acantharians sink into deep water. Genetic data and some imaging suggests that non-cyst-forming acantharians may also sink to deep water to release swarmers. Releasing swarmer cells in deeper water may improve the survival chances of juveniles. Study of these organisms has been hampered mainly by an inability to "close the lifecycle" and maintain these organisms in culture through successive generations.
