= Lapideacassaceae =

Scientific classification
- Domain: Eukaryota
- (unranked): Haptophyta
- Class: Prymnesiophyceae
- Family: Lapideacassaceae Black, 1971

Genera
- Mennerius; Tintinnabuliformis

Family of single-celled organisms

Lapideacassaceae is a family of haptophytes belonging to the class Prymnesiophyceae. The family Lapideacassaceae accommodate ‘bell-shaped’ to cylindrical nannoliths with body consisting of a single or several vertically elongated calcite elements and often bearing apical spine(s). The family Lapideacassaceae contains two genera, Mennerius and Tintinnabuliformis. Members of the Lapideacassaceae occur sporadically but widely in the Cretaceous, Palaeogene and Neogene sediments in the Northern Hemisphere, South Atlantic, South Africa, Tanzania, Indian Ocean and Australia.
