= Prymnesin-B1 =

Names
- IUPAC name 1-((2R,3S,4R,5S,6R)-6-((2R,2'S,3'R,4aS,4'aR,6S,6'S,7R,8S,8aR,8'S,8'aS)-6'-(2-((2R,4aS,6S,7R,8aR)-6-((2S,4aR,5aS,6aR,7aS,10R,11aR,12aS,13aR,15S,15aS)-10-((1E,3E,8E,10E,18E)-6-amino-19-chlorononadeca-1,3,8,10,18-pentaen-12,16-diyn-1-yl)-15-hydroxyoctadecahydropyrano[3,2-b]pyrano[2,3:5',6']pyrano[2',3':5,6]pyrano[2,3-f]oxepin-2-yl)-7-methyloctahydropyrano[3,2-b]pyran-2-yl)-2-hydroxyethyl)-3',7,8,8'-tetrahydroxyhexadecahydro-[2,2'-bipyrano[3,2-b]pyran]-6-yl)-3,4,5-trihydroxytetrahydro-2H-pyran-2-yl)-3-(((2R,3R,4S,5R,6R)-3,4,5-trihydroxy-6-(hydroxymethyl)tetrahydro-2H-pyran-2-yl)oxy)hexadeca-13,15-diyne-2,4,6,7,8,9,10-heptaol

Identifiers
3D model (JSmol)	Interactive image
PubChem CID	132524595
- InChI: InChI=1S/C91H132ClNO34/c1-3-4-5-19-24-48(95)72(103)76(107)73(104)50(97)37-52(99)84(127-91-82(113)78(109)75(106)71(43-94)125-91)53(100)39-69-74(105)77(108)79(110)89(124-69)90-81(112)80(111)88-62(123-90)32-31-61(122-88)86-55(102)40-70-87(126-86)51(98)36-47(115-70)35-49(96)56-27-28-58-63(116-56)34-44(2)83(120-58)59-29-30-60-85(121-59)54(101)38-64-66(118-60)42-67-68(119-64)41-65-57(117-67)26-25-46(114-65)23-18-15-17-22-45(93)21-16-13-11-9-7-6-8-10-12-14-20-33-92/h1,9,11,13,15-18,20,23,33,44-91,94-113H,8,10,19,21-22,24-32,34-43,93H2,2H3/b11-9+,16-13+,17-15+,23-18+,33-20+/t44-,45?,46+,47+,48?,49?,50?,51+,52?,53?,54+,55-,56-,57+,58+,59+,60-,61-,62+,63-,64-,65-,66+,67-,68+,69-,70-,71-,72?,73?,74-,75+,76?,77-,78+,79+,80+,81-,82-,83+,84?,85+,86+,87+,88+,89-,90+,91-/m1/s1 Key: SAZIEJFUWXAXHO-UFLXIURCSA-N
- SMILES: [H][C@@]([C@@]1([H])[C@@H](O)[C@@H]([C@H](O)[C@](CC(O)C(O[C@@H]2[C@H](O)[C@H]([C@@H](O)[C@@H](CO)O2)O)C(O)CC(O)C(O)C(O)C(O)C(O)CCC#CC#C)([H])O1)O)([C@@H]([C@@H]([C@]3(O[C@]([C@](O4)([H])[C@H](O)C[C@]5([H])[C@]4([H])[C@@H](O)C[C@@](CC([C@@]([H])(CC[C@](O[C@@]6([C@@](O[C@]7([C@H](C8)O)[H])(CC[C@@]7([H])O[C@](C[C@]([H])9O[C@]%10(CC[C@@]%11(/C=C/C=C/CC(C/C=C/C=C/C#CCCC#C/C=C/Cl)N)[H])[H])([H])[C@]8([H])O[C@]9(C[C@@](O%11)%10[H])[H])[H])[H])%12[H])O[C@@]%12(C[C@H]6C)[H])O)([H])O5)([H])CC%13)[H])O)O)O[C@]3%13[H]

Properties
Chemical formula	C_{91}H_{132}ClNO_{34}
Molar mass	1819.48 g·mol^{−1}
- Except where otherwise noted, data are given for materials in their standard state (at 25 °C [77 °F], 100 kPa). Infobox references

Prymnesin-B1 is a chemical with the molecular formula C_{91}H_{132}ClNO_{34}. It is a member of the prymnesins, a class of ladder-frame polyether phycotoxins made by the alga Prymnesium parvum. It is known to be toxic to fish. It is a so called "B-type" prymnesin, which differ in the number of backbone cycles when compared to A-type prymnesins like prymnesin-2.

== Structures ==
Prymnesins-B1 is formed of a large polyether polycyclic core with several conjugate double and triple bonds, chlorine and nitrogen heteroatoms and a single sugar moiety consisting of α-D-galactopyranose.

== Biosynthesis ==
The backbone of B-type prymnesins like prymnesin-B1 is reportedly made by giant polyketide synthase enzymes dubbed the "PKZILLAs".

== See also ==
- Prymnesin-1
- Prymnesin-2
