= Prymnesin-1 =

Names
- IUPAC name 77‐Amino‐6,35,90‐trichloro‐17,21:22,26:25,29:30,34:33,37:38,42:41,45:46,50:49,53:54,58:57,62:61,65:64,68:67,71‐tetradecaepoxy‐52‐methyl 14‐(5‐hydroxymethyl‐3,4‐dihydroxy‐2‐oxolanyloxy)‐9‐[5‐(1,2‐dihydroxyethyl)‐3,4‐dihydroxy‐2‐oxolanyloxy]‐13‐(3,4,5‐trihydroxytetrahydro‐2H‐pyran‐2‐yloxy)‐72,74,79,81,89‐nonacontapentene‐1,3,83,87‐tetryne‐7,8,10,11,15,18,19,20,23,24,31,39,43,59‐tetradecol
- Other names PRM1

Identifiers
CAS Number	168180-17-4
3D model (JSmol)	Interactive image
PubChem CID	102510994
CompTox Dashboard (EPA)	DTXSID201044366
- InChI: InChI=1S/C107H154Cl3NO44/c1-3-4-15-23-49(109)79(122)85(128)102(155-107-92(135)89(132)100(154–107)57(120)43-112)81(124)51(114)35-77(149-105-90(133)80(123)58(121)45-136-105)99(153-106-91(134)83(126)78(44-113)150-106)54(117)38-73-82(125)84(127)86(129)103(148-73)104-88(131)87(130)101-65(147–104)31-30-64(146–101)96-55(118)39-75-94(151-96)50(110)34-74(143-75)97-56(119)40-76-98(152-97)53(116)36-67(142-76)60-26-27-61-66(138-60)33-46(2)93(144-61)62-28-29-63-95(145-62)52(115)37-68-70(140-63)42-71-72(141-68)41-69-59(139-71)25-24-48(137-69)22-18-14-17-21-47(111)20-16-12-10-8-6-5-7-9-11-13-19-32-108/h1,8,10,12,14,16-19,22,32,46-107,112-135H,7,9,20-21,23-31,33-45,111H2,2H3/b10-8?,16-12?,17-14?,22-18?,32-19- Key: JWYXXCZNFFQYGQ-UOMKELITSA-N
- SMILES: C#CC#CC[C@H](Cl)C(O)C(O)C(O[C@@H]1O[C@]([C@@H](CO)O)([H])[C@H](O)[C@H]1O)C(O)C(O)CC(O[C@H]2[C@H](O)[C@@H](O)[C@@H](O)CO2)C(O[C@@H]3[C@H](O)[C@H](O)[C@@H](CO)O3)C(O)C[C@@]([C@@H](O)[C@@H](O)[C@@H]4O)([H])O[C@@]4([H])[C@@]5([H])O[C@]6([H])[C@@](O[C@]([C@]7([H])[C@H](O)C[C@](O[C@]([C@@]8([H])O[C@]([C@@H](O)C[C@@]([C@]9([H])O[C@@](C[C@@H](C)[C@]([C@@]%10([H])O[C@@]%11([H])[C@@H](O)C[C@@]%12([H])O[C@@]%13([H])C[C@@]%14([H])O[C@@]([H])(/C=C/C=C/C[C@@H](N)C/C=C/C=C/C#CCCC#C/C=C/Cl)CC[C@]%14([H])O[C@]%13([H])C[C@]%12([H])O[C@]%11([H])CC%10)([H])O%15)([H])[C@]%15([H])CC9)([H])O%16)([H])[C@@]%16([H])C[C@@H]8O)([H])C[C@@H]%17Cl)([H])[C@@]%17([H])O7)([H])CC6)([H])[C@@H](O)[C@H]5O

Properties
Chemical formula	C_{107}H_{154}Cl_{3}NO_{44}
Molar mass	2264.72 g·mol^{−1}
- Except where otherwise noted, data are given for materials in their standard state (at 25 °C [77 °F], 100 kPa). Infobox references

Prymnesin-1 is a chemical with the molecular formula C_{107}H_{154}Cl_{3}NO_{44}. It is a member of the prymnesins, a class of hemolytic phycotoxins made by the alga Prymnesium parvum. It is known to be toxic to fish, causing mass fish deaths around the world, including in Texas and England, or in 2022 in the border region of Germany and Poland (Oder).

== Structures ==
Prymnesin-1 is formed of a large polyether polycyclic core with several conjugate double and triple bonds, chlorine and nitrogen heteroatoms and O-linked sugar moieties including α-D-ribofuranose, α-L-arabinopyranose, and β-D-galactofuranose, unlike the single linked α-L-xylofuranose of prymnesin-2. There are three forms of prymnesin known, prymnesin 1 and 2, differing in their glycosylation, and prymnesin B1 differing in backbone.

== Biosynthesis ==
The backbone of A-type prymnesins like prymnesin-1 is reportedly made by giant polyketide synthase enzymes dubbed the "PKZILLAs" of which PKZILLA-1 and PKZILLA-2 are known. PKZILLA-1 is composed of 45,212 amino acids with a chemical formula of C_{208516}H_{334220}N_{60758}O_{63313}S_{1733}, making it the largest known protein. It has a molar mass of 4760921.41 g·mol^{−1}.

== See also ==
- Prymnesin-2
- Prymnesin-B1
- Titin, largest protein in human muscles and the previous largest known protein with 34,350 amino acids.
