= Rappephyceae =

Scientific classification
- Domain: Eukaryota
- Division: Haptophyta
- Class: Rappephyceae; M. Kawachi, R. Kamikawa & T. Nakayama, 2021

Orders
- Pavlomulinales; other unidentified groups

Family of protista

Rappephyceae, or rappemonads, are a small class of protists first described in 2011, of uncertain phylogenic affinity. It has been discussed as a possible member of a larger clade Haptophyta. This newly identified taxonomic class of phytoplankton are named after a professor from the Hawai’i institute of marine biology, known as Michael Rappé. Rappé published a number of 16S rRNA gene sequences in 1998 from the Atlantic Ocean and recognized some must come from plastids (the photosynthetic organelle of eukaryotic cells). The Worden Lab then recovered a sequence similar to one of the most divergent in the Pacific Ocean, and designed quantitative assays to survey its distribution while collaborators from the Archibald Lab and Richards Labs analyzed the evolutionary relationships and performed FISH assays, leading to the description of a divergent algal type they termed "Rappemonads". Research since has shown that these organisms provide an immense amount of nutritional molecules, such as oxygen, for other organisms using biochemical processes like photosynthesis and carbon fixation.

== Classification ==
Additional sequencing and enhanced databases have since led to additional phylogenetic analyses that indicate Rappephyceae are divergent members of the Haptophyte clade. The haptophytes comprise around 500 marine algal species. One of the most novel characteristics of haptophytes is their calcite, or calcium carbonate, scales that cover the cell. These are also known as coccoliths and the whole organism can be referred to as a coccolithophore. Coccolithophores are responsible for approximately 50% of the calcium carbonate precipitation in oceans. However, so far there is no evidence that Rappemonads have such structures, and both Rappemonads and an isolate named Rappephyceae represent a newly classified divergent group, with unclear overlap in terms of evolutionary properties shared with other Coccolithophores. Indeed, Rappephyceae earn their own class from their unique morphology. They represent a plastid-bearing protistan lineage, identified using molecular sequencing techniques with environmental plastid 16s rRNA.

== Biological properties ==
As members of the Haptophyte clade, Rappephyceae are considered autotrophs. Similar to plants, phytoplankton contain chlorophyll in their cells which act to capture sunlight, carbon dioxide, and water; These molecules are converted from light energy to chemical energy creating essential biomolecules like oxygen and glucose. Since phytoplankton have no use for the oxygen molecules, they are released and acquired by more complex organisms. This process is often referred to as photosynthesis, or the light cycle as it occurs in the presence of sunlight. This characteristic give Rappephyceae the title of primary producers.

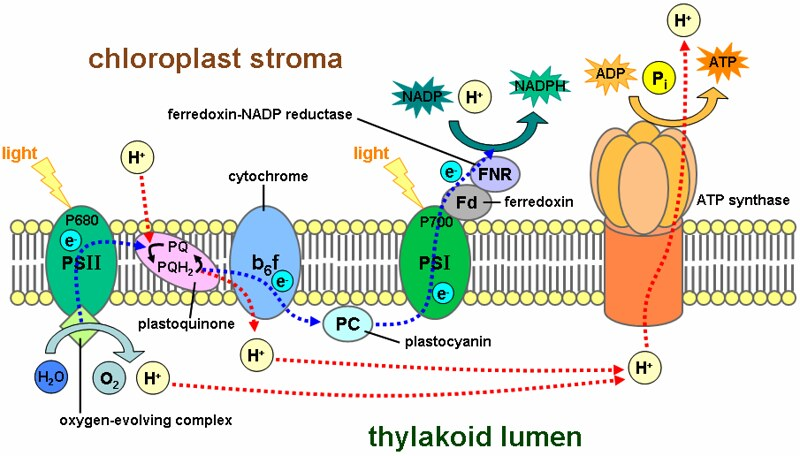
Photosynthesis at the cellular level
