= Pavlova (alga) =

Scientific classification
- Domain: Eukaryota
- Clade: Haptista
- Division: Haptophyta
- Class: Pavlovophyceae
- Order: Pavlovales
- Family: Pavlovaceae
- Genus: Pavlova; Butcher, 1952

Genus of algae

Pavlova is a genus of algae belonging to the family Pavlovaceae.

The genus has cosmopolitan distribution.

The genus name of Pavlova is in honour of Anna Pawlowna Pawlowa (1881–1931), who was a Russian prima ballerina of the late 19th and the early 20th centuries. This is because "the movement of the type species, Pavlova gyrans, is positively balletic".

The genus was circumscribed by Roger William Butcher in J. Mar. Biol. Assoc. U.K. vol.31 on page 183, fig. 35-38 in 1952.

== Species ==
As accepted by AlgaeBase;

- Pavlova calceolata J.van der Veer
- Pavlova ennorea van der Veer & Leewis
- Pavlova granifera (B.Mack) J.C.Green
- Pavlova gyrans Butcher
- Pavlova helicata J.van der Veer
- Pavlova hommersandii P.H.Campbell
- Pavlova lutheri (Droop) J.C.Green
- Pavlova mesolychnon J.van der Veer
- Pavlova noctivaga (Kalina) van der Veer & Leewis
- Pavlova pinguis J.C.Green
- Pavlova salina (N.Carter) J.C.Green
- Pavlova virescens Billard
- Pavlova viridis C.K.Tseng, J.Chen & X.Zhang
