= Acanthometridae =

Scientific classification
- Domain: Eukaryota
- Supergroup: Rhizaria
- Phylum: Radiolaria
- Class: Acantharia
- Order: Symphiacanthida
- Family: Acanthometridae; Haeckel, 1887

Genera
- Acanthometra J. Müller, 1856; Acanthometron; Amphilonche

Family of single-celled organisms

Acanthometridae is a family of radiolarians.
