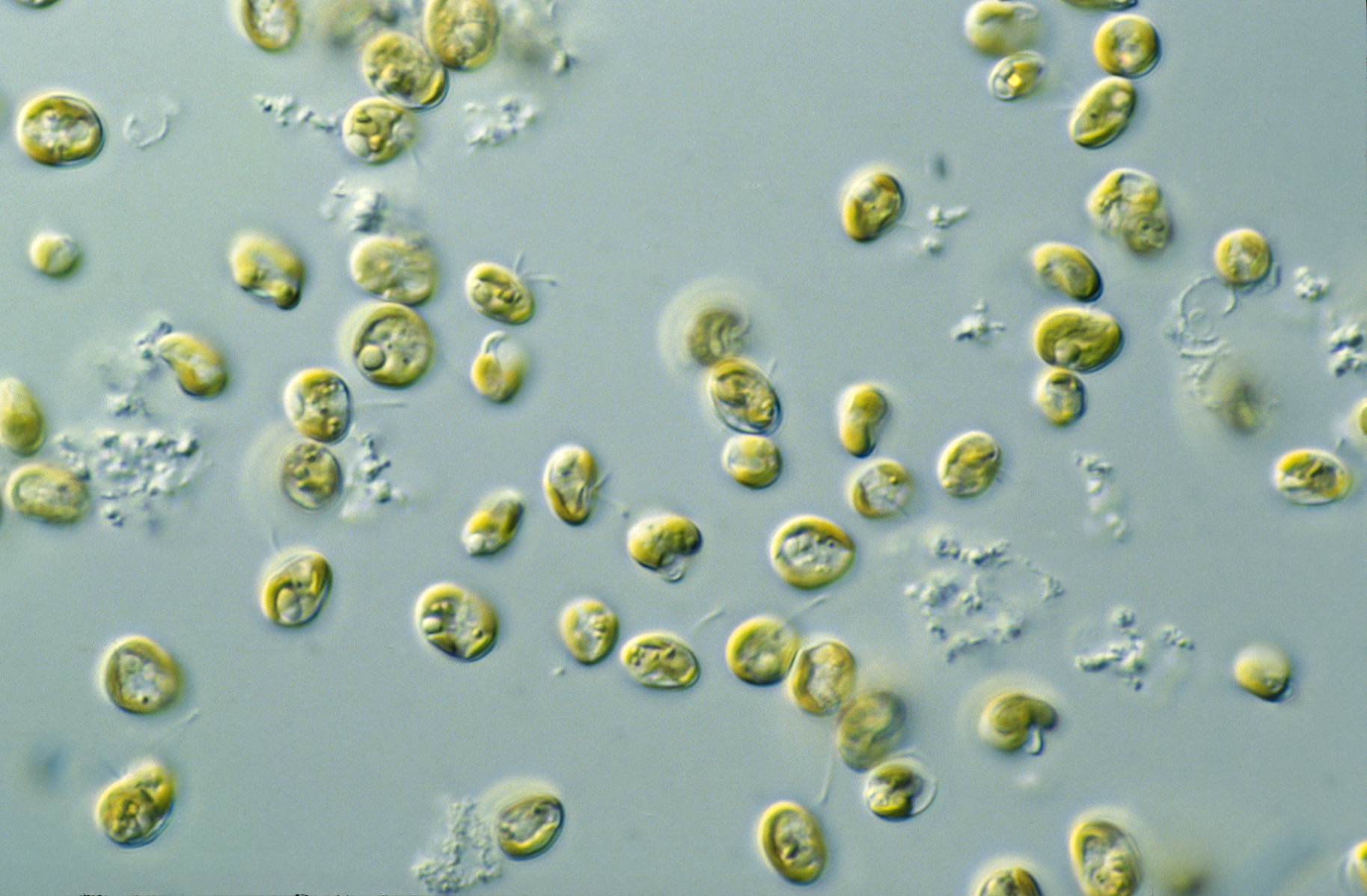
- Pavlova sp.

Scientific classification
- Domain: Eukaryota
- Clade: Haptista
- Division: Haptophyta
- Class: Pavlovophyceae; J. C. Green & L. K. Medlin, 2000
- Order: Pavlovales; J. C. Green
- Family: Pavlovaceae; J. C. Green

Genera
- Diacronema; Exanthemachrysis; Pavlova; Rebecca

Synonyms
- Pavlovea T. Cavalier-Smith, 1993

= Pavlovaceae =

Family of single-celled organisms

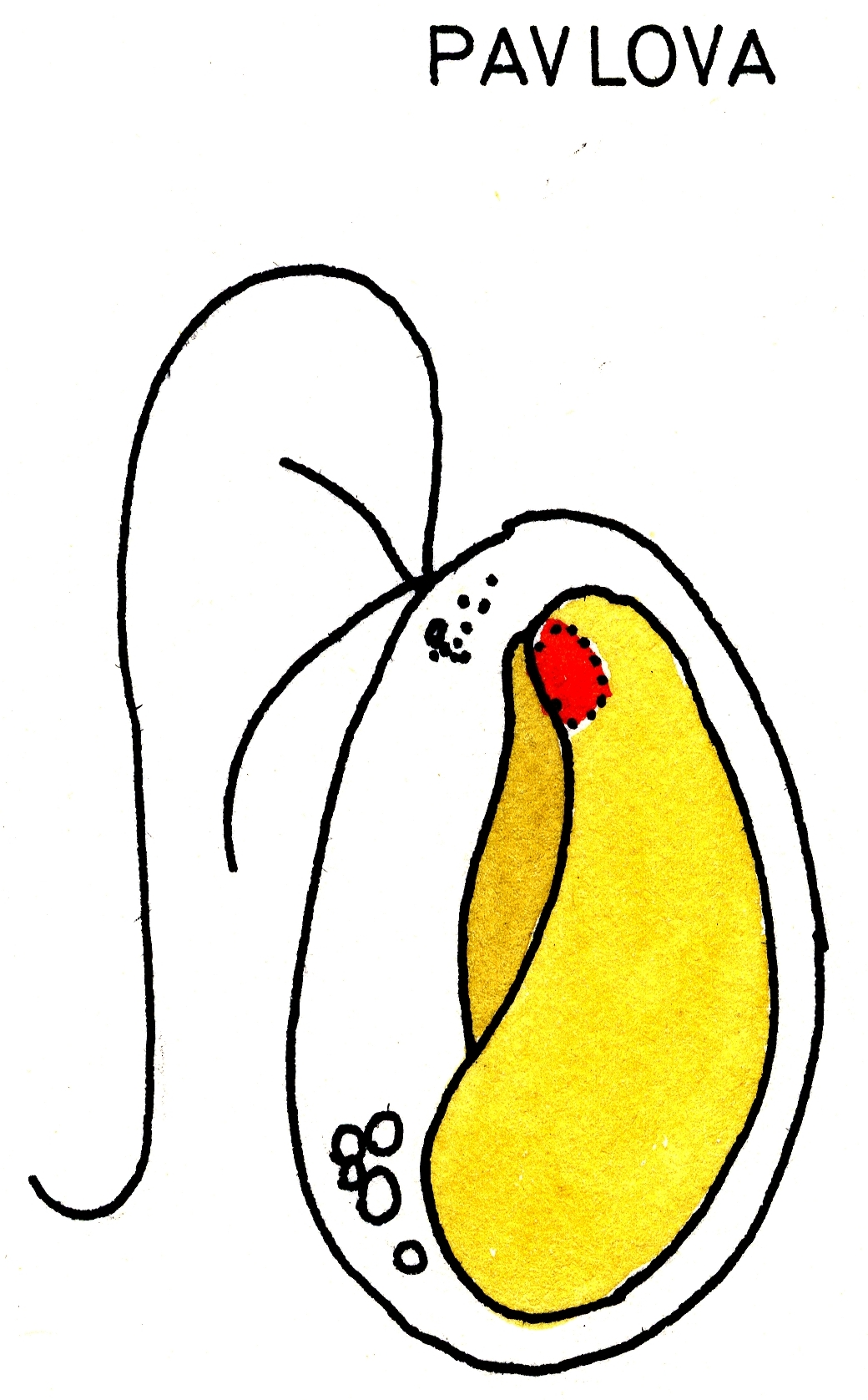
Illustration: Pavlova

Pavlovaceae is a family of haptophytes. It is the only family in the order Pavlovales, which is the only order in the class Pavlovophyceae. It contains four genera, Diacronema, Exanthemachrysis, Pavlova and Rebecca.

Pavlovophyceae haptophytes also reportedly store photosynthetic carbon in paramylon polysaccharide granules (with a crystalline microfibrillar structure), unlike the chrysolaminarin used as the polysaccharide storage form by most haptophytes.
