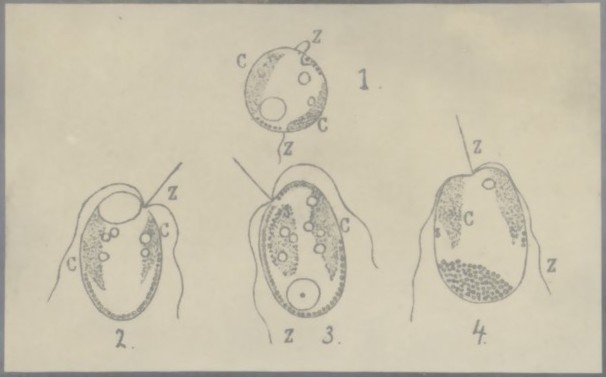
- Prymnesium, of which this family is named after

Scientific classification
- Domain: Eukaryota
- Division: Haptophyta
- Class: Prymnesiophyceae
- Order: Prymnesiales
- Family: Prymnesiaceae; Conrad ex O.C.Schmidt

= Prymnesiaceae =

Family of single-celled organisms

Prymnesiaceae is a family of algae in the clade Haptophyta. It contains toxic microalgae such as Prymnesium.

== Genera ==
- Apistonema
- Chrysocampanula
- Chrysoculter
- Corymbellus
- Haptolina
- Hyalolithus
- Imantonia
- Petasaria
- Platychrysis
- Prymnesium
- Pseudohaptolina
