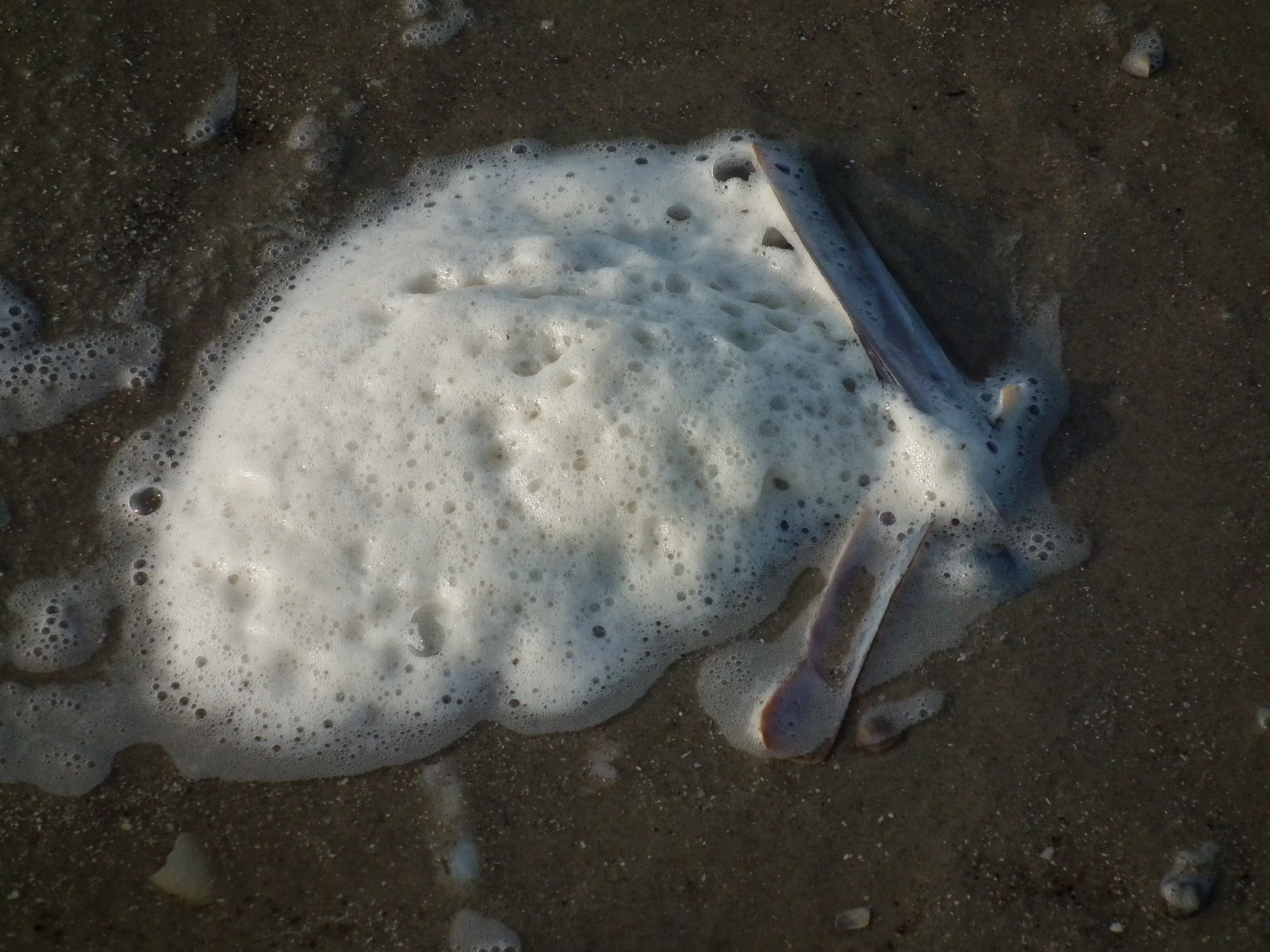
- Phaeocystis globosa

Scientific classification
- Domain: Eukaryota
- Supergroup: Haptista
- Division: Haptophyta
- Class: Prymnesiophyceae
- Order: Phaeocystales; Medlin, 2000
- Family: Phaeocystaceae; Lagerheim, 1896
- Genus: Phaeocystis; Lagerheim, 1893

= Phaeocystis =

Genus of single-celled organisms

Phaeocystis is a genus of algae belonging to the Prymnesiophyte class and to the larger division of Haptophyta. It is a widespread marine phytoplankton and can function at a wide range of temperatures (eurythermal) and salinities (euryhaline). Members of this genus live in the open ocean, as well as in sea ice. It has a polymorphic life cycle, ranging from free-living cells to large colonies.

The ability to form a floating colony is one of the unique attributes of Phaeocystis – hundreds of cells are embedded in a polysaccharide gel matrix, which can increase massively in size during blooms. The largest Phaeocystis blooms form in the polar seas: P. pouchetii in the north and P. antarctica in the south. This intense Phaeocystis productivity generally persists for about a three-month period, spanning most of the summer in the Southern Hemisphere. Phaeocystis-abundant ecosystems are generally associated with commercially important stocks of crustaceans, molluscs, fish and mammals. Phaeocystis may have negative effects on higher trophic levels in the marine ecosystem, and consequent impacts on human activities (such as fish farming and coastal tourism), by forming odorous foams on beaches during the wane of a bloom.

The ability to form large blooms and its ubiquity make Phaeocystis an important contributor to the ocean carbon cycle. In addition, Phaeocystis produces dimethyl sulfide (DMS), a key player in the sulfur cycle.

== Distribution and life cycle ==
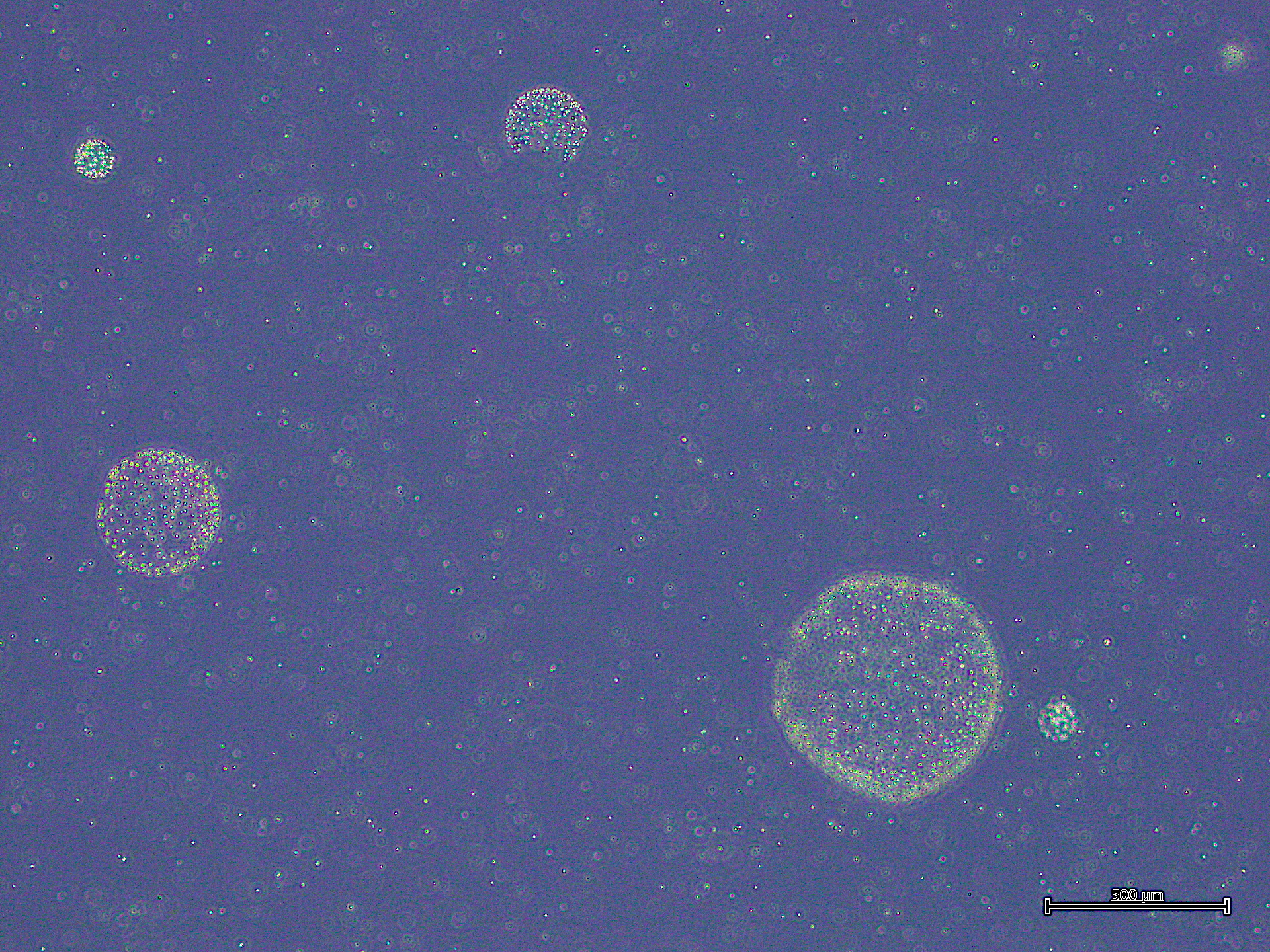
Phaeocystis globosa colonies in culture. Scale bar is 500 μm.

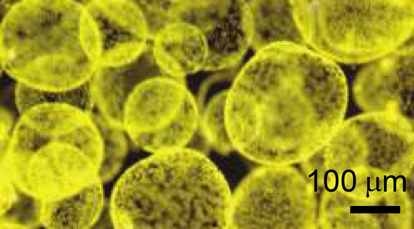
Phaeocystis antarctica colonies, important phytoplankters of the Ross Sea that dominate early season blooms after the sea ice retreats and export significant carbon.

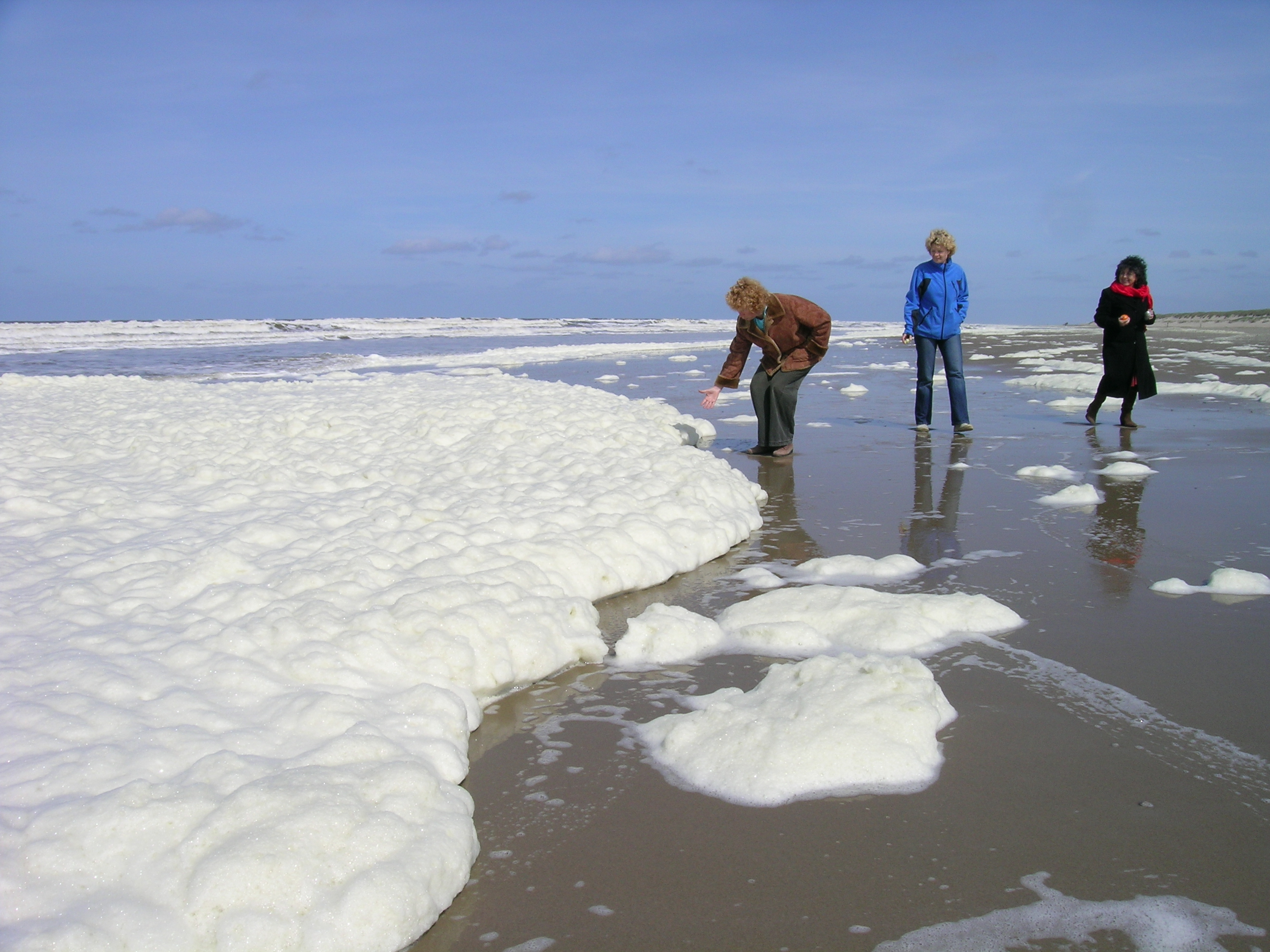
White Phaeocystis algal foam washing up on a beach.

Free-living forms of Phaeocystis are globally distributed and occur in a variety of marine habitats, including coastal oceans, open oceans, polar seas and sea ice. Seven species are currently assigned to the genus: P. antarctica, P. jahnii, P. globosa, P. pouchetti, P. scrobiculata (not in culture), P. cordata, and P. rex. Three species (P. globosa, P. pouchetii, and P. antarctica) are associated with bloom formation in nutrient-rich areas, which can occur either naturally (e.g. in the Ross Sea, Greenland Sea or the Barents Sea) or due to anthropogenic inputs (e.g. in the Southern Bight of the North Sea or the Persian Gulf). Generally, P. globosa blooms in temperate and tropical waters, whereas P. pouchetii and P. antarctica are better adjusted to the cold temperatures prevailing in Arctic and Antarctic waters, respectively. However, P. pouchetii also tolerates warmer temperatures and has been seen in temperate waters.

Genome comparison has shown that the RUBISCO spacer region (located in the plastid DNA, between two subunits of the enzyme 1,5 -bisphosphate carboxylase) is highly conserved among closely related colonial Phaeocystis species and identical in P. antarctica, P. pouchetii and two warm-temperate strains of P. globosa, with a single base substitution in two cold-temperate strains of P. globosa.

Phaeocystis can exist as either free-living cells or colonies. Free-living cells can show a variety of morphologies, depending on the species. All species can exist as scaled flagellates, and this is the only form that has been observed for P. scrobiculata and P. cordata. Three species have been observed as colonies (P. globosa, P. pouchetii and P. antarctica) and these can also exist as a flagellate devoid of scales and filaments. In colonies of Phaeocystis, the colony skin may provide protection against smaller zooplankton grazers and viruses.

While suspected in other species (P. pouchetii and P. antarctica), a haploid-diploid life cycle has only been observed in P. globosa. In this cycle, sexual reproduction is dominant in colony bloom formation/termination, and two types of vegetative reproduction exist.

== Impacts on global ocean ==
The genus Phaeocystis is a major producer of 3-dimethylsulphoniopropionate (DMSP), the precursor of dimethyl sulfide (DMS). Biogenic DMS contributes approximately 1.5×10^{13} g sulfur to the atmosphere annually and plays a major part in the global sulfur cycle, which can affect cloud formation and, potentially, climate regulation.

== Symbiosis ==
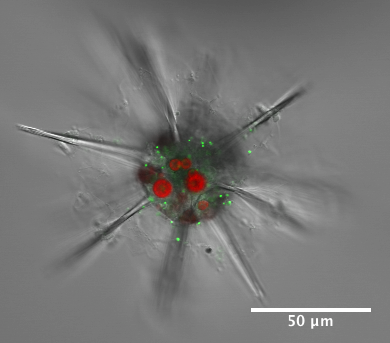
Fluorescent microscopy of photosymbiotic acantharian hosting Phaeocystis symbionts. Red fluorescence is chlorophyll autofluorescence and allows observation of the altered morphology of Phaeocystis chloroplasts. Green fluorescence corresponds to LysoTracker dye, which stains digestive compartments. Symbionts are not being digested.

Phaeocystis species are endosymbionts to acantharian radiolarians. Acantharians collected in different ocean basins host different species of Phaeocystis as their dominant symbionts: P. antarctica is found as the primary symbiont to acantharians in the Southern Ocean and P. cordata and P. jahnii are among the dominant symbionts found in acantharians collected in warm oligotrophic regions of the Indian and Pacific oceans. In addition to the described Phaeocystis species, sequences belonging to the molecular clade Phaeo02 often make up a majority of symbiotic sequences recovered from acantharians in warm-water regions. Whether or not this symbiosis represents a true mutualism with both partners benefiting, is debated. Extreme cellular remodeling is observed in symbiotic Phaeocystis, including a drastic increase in chloroplast number and an enlarged central vacuole. This phenotypic change is probably induced by the host to increase photosynthetic output by symbionts, but if it renders symbiotic cells incapable of future cell-division, the symbiosis is a dead end for Phaeocystis. The symbiosis is ecologically relevant because it creates primary production hot spots in low-nutrient regions, but it remains to be determined how the symbiosis has affected Phaeocystis evolution.
