= Arthracanthida =

Scientific classification
- Domain: Eukaryota
- Clade: Sar
- Clade: Rhizaria
- Phylum: Radiozoa
- Class: Acantharia
- Order: Arthracanthida; Schewiakoff, 1926

Synonyms
- Acanthometrida

Group of protists

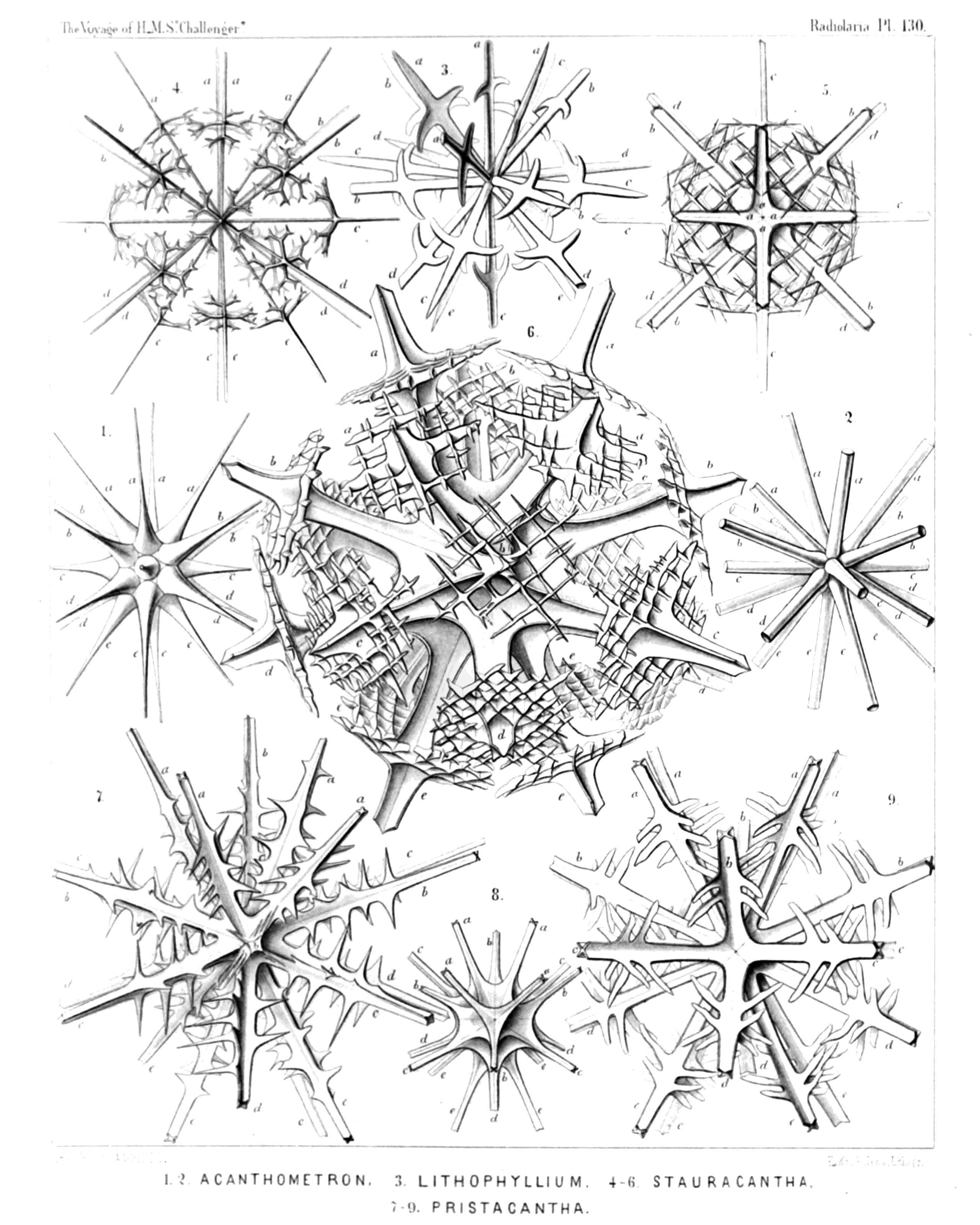
Radiolaria (Challenger) Plate.

Arthracanthida, a subclass of Acantharea, is a group of marine protozoans. They consist mainly of a gelatinous sheath filled with cytoplasm and a skeleton of up to 20 radially placed spicules made of celestine (strontium sulfate). While mostly found in the upper areas of the ocean, they are able to move vertically by using microfilaments attached to the spicules to expand and contract the sheath. They are plentiful in the Gulf Stream during the summer months, but little is known about their overall distribution.
