= Prymnesin =

Prymnesin may refer to:

- Prymnesin-1
- Prymnesin-2
- Prymnesin-B1
- Prymnesin-B2
