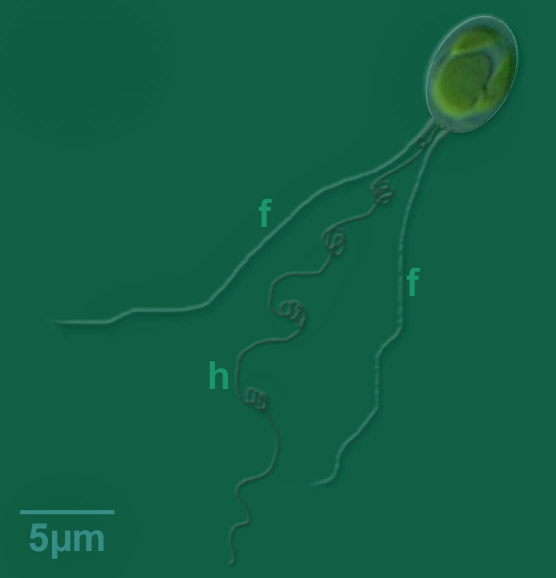
- Chrysochromulina

Scientific classification
- Domain: Eukaryota
- Clade: Haptista
- Division: Haptophyta
- Class: Prymnesiophyceae
- Order: Prymnesiales; Papenfuss

Families
- Chrysochromulinaceae; Chrysoculteraceae; Prymnesiaceae

= Prymnesiales =

Order of single-celled organisms

Prymnesiales is an order of Haptophyceae.

It currently consists of three families:

- Prymnesiaceae
- Chrysochromulinaceae
- Chrysoculteraceae
