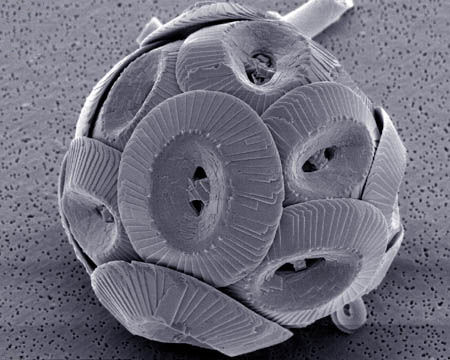
- Coccolithophore (Coccolithus pelagicus)

Scientific classification
- Domain: Eukaryota
- Clade: Haptista
- Division: Haptophyta; Hibberd 1976 ex Edvardsen & Eikrem 2000

Classes and orders
- Rappephyceae; Pavlomulinales; Pavlovophyceae; Pavlovales; Prymnesiophyceae s.s. (=Coccolithophyceae); †Arkhangelskiales; Coccolithales; †Discoasterales; †Eiffellithales; Isochrysidales; Phaeocystales; †Podorhabdales; Prymnesiales; Stephanolithiales; Syracosphaerales; †Watznaueriales; Zygodiscales

Synonyms
- Prymnesiophyta Green & Jordan 1994; Prymnesiophyceae (s.l.) Casper 1972 ex Hibberd 1976; Haptophyceae (s.l.) Christensen 1962 ex Silva 1980; Haptophytina Hibberd 1976 stat. n. Cavalier-Smith 2015

= Haptophyte =

Haptophytes

Type of algae

The haptophytes, classified either as the Haptophytina, Haptophyta or Prymnesiophyta (named for Prymnesium), are a clade of algae that can produce minerals.

The names Haptophyceae or Prymnesiophyceae are sometimes used instead. This ending implies classification at the class rank rather than as a division. Although the phylogenetics of this group has become much better understood in recent years, there remains some dispute over which rank is most appropriate.

== Characteristics ==
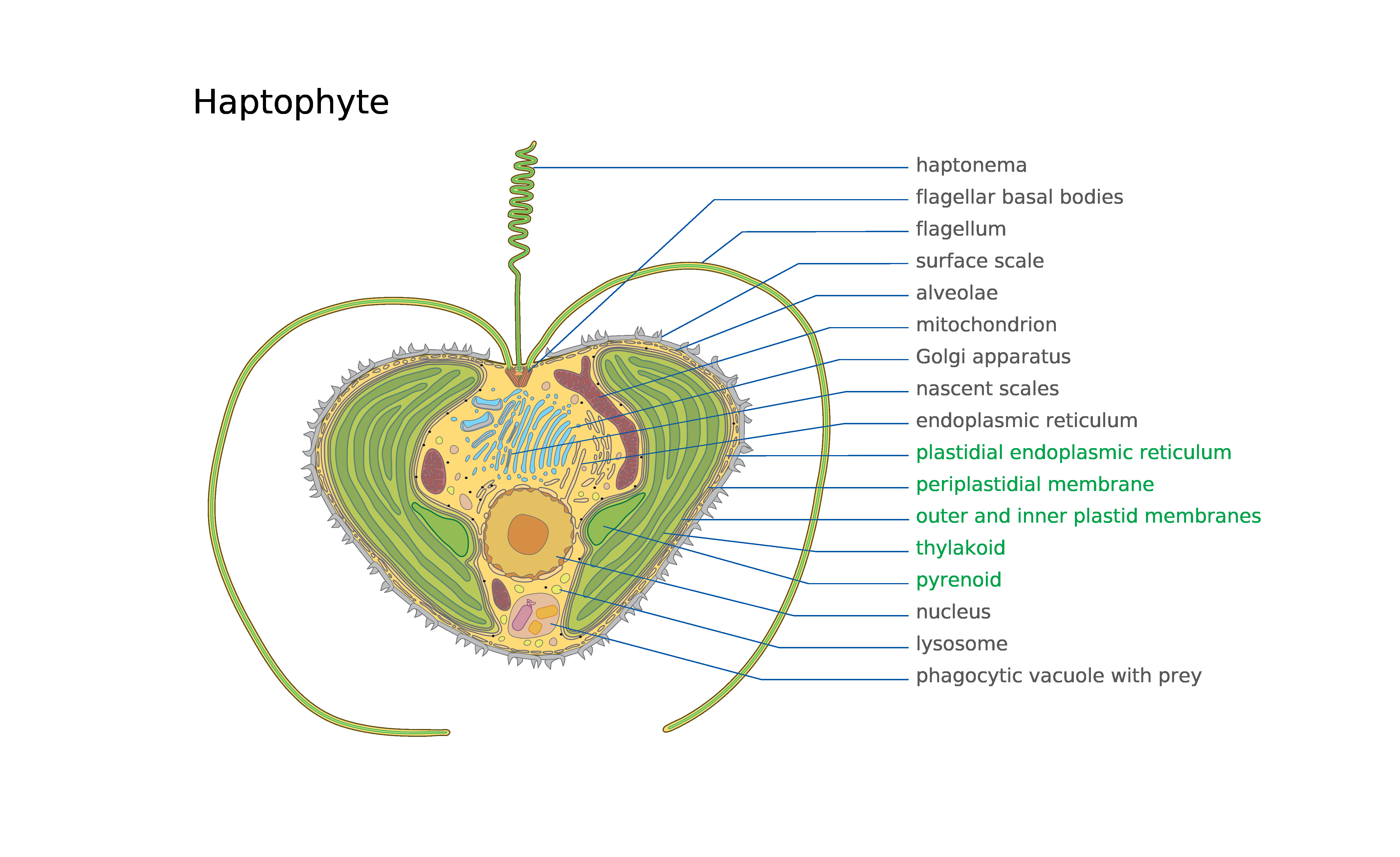
Diagram of a haptophyte cell

The chloroplasts are pigmented similarly to those of the heterokonts, but the structure of the rest of the cell is different, so it may be that they are a separate line whose chloroplasts are derived from similar red algal endosymbionts. Haptophyte chloroplasts contain chlorophylls a, c_{1}, and c_{2} but lack chlorophyll b. For carotenoids, they have beta-, alpha-, and gamma- carotenes. Like diatoms and brown algae, they have also fucoxanthin, an oxidized isoprenoid derivative that is likely the most important driver of their brownish-yellow color.

The cells typically have two slightly unequal flagella, both of which are smooth, and a unique organelle called a haptonema, which is superficially similar to a flagellum but differs in the arrangement of microtubules and in its use. The name comes from the Greek hapsis, touch, and nema, round thread. The mitochondria have tubular cristae.

Most haptophytes reportedly produce chrysolaminarin rather than starch as their major storage polysaccharide, but some Pavlovaceae produce paramylon. The chain length of the chrysolaminarin is reportedly short (polymers of 20–50 glycosides, unlike the 300+ of comparable amylose), and it is located in cytoplasmic membrane-bound vacuoles.

== Significance ==
The best-known haptophytes are coccolithophores, which make up 673 of the 762 described haptophyte species, and have an exoskeleton of calcareous plates called coccoliths. Coccolithophores are some of the most abundant marine phytoplankton, especially in the open ocean, and are extremely abundant as microfossils, forming chalk deposits. Other planktonic haptophytes of note include Chrysochromulina and Prymnesium, which periodically form toxic marine algal blooms, and Phaeocystis, blooms of which can produce unpleasant foam which often accumulates on beaches.

Haptophytes are economically important, as species such as Pavlova lutheri and Isochrysis sp. are widely used in the aquaculture industry to feed oyster and shrimp larvae. They contain a large amount of polyunsaturated fatty acids such as docosahexaenoic acid (DHA), stearidonic acid and alpha-linolenic acid. Tisochrysis lutea contains betain lipids and phospholipids.

== Classification ==
The haptophytes were first placed in the class Chrysophyceae (golden algae), but ultrastructural data have provided evidence to classify them separately. Both molecular and morphological evidence supports their division into five orders; coccolithophores make up the Isochrysidales and Coccolithales. Very small (2–3μm) uncultured pico-prymnesiophytes are ecologically important.

Haptophytes was discussed to be closely related to cryptomonads.

Haptophytes are closely related to the SAR clade.

- Subphylum Haptophytina Cavalier-Smith 2015 [Haptophyta Hibberd 1976 sensu Ruggerio et al. 2015]
  - Class Rappephyceae Cavalier-Smith 2015
    - Order Rappemonadales
      - Family Rappemonadaceae
  - Class Pavlovophyceae Cavalier-Smith 1986 [Pavlovophycidae Cavalier-Smith 1986]
    - Order Pavlovales Green 1976
      - Family Pavlovaceae Green 1976
  - Class Prymnesiophyceae Christensen 1962 emend. Cavalier-Smith 1996 [Haptophyceae s.s.; Prymnesiophycidae Cavalier-Smith 1986; Coccolithophyceae Casper 1972 ex Rothmaler 1951]
    - Family †Eoconusphaeraceae Kristan-Tollmann 1988 [Conusphaeraceae]
    - Family †Goniolithaceae Deflandre 1957
    - Family †Lapideacassaceae Black, 1971
    - Family †Microrhabdulaceae Deflandre 1963
    - Family †Nannoconaceae Deflandre 1959
    - Family †Polycyclolithaceae Forchheimer 1972 emend Varol, 1992
    - Family †Lithostromationaceae Deflandre 1959
    - Family †Rhomboasteraceae Bown, 2005
    - Family Braarudosphaeraceae Deflandre 1947
    - Family Ceratolithaceae Norris 1965 emend Young & Bown 2014 [Triquetrorhabdulaceae Lipps 1969 - cf Young & Bown 2014]
    - Family Alisphaeraceae Young et al., 2003
    - Family Papposphaeraceae Jordan & Young 1990 emend Andruleit & Young 2010
    - Family Umbellosphaeraceae Young et al., 2003 [Umbellosphaeroideae]
    - Order †Discoasterales Hay 1977
      - Family †Discoasteraceae Tan 1927
      - Family †Heliolithaceae Hay & Mohler 1967
      - Family †Sphenolithaceae Deflandre 1952
      - Family †Fasciculithaceae Hay & Mohler 1967
    - Order Phaeocystales Medlin 2000
      - Family Phaeocystaceae Lagerheim 1896
    - Order Prymnesiales Papenfuss 1955 emend. Edvardsen and Eikrem 2000
      - Family Chrysochromulinaceae Edvardsen, Eikrem & Medlin 2011
      - Family Prymnesiaceae Conrad 1926 ex Schmidt 1931
    - Subclass Calcihaptophycidae
      - Order Isochrysidales Pascher 1910 [Prinsiales Young & Bown 1997]
        - Family †Prinsiaceae Hay & Mohler 1967 emend. Young & Bown, 1997
        - Family Isochrysidaceae Parke 1949 [Chrysotilaceae; Marthasteraceae Hay 1977]
        - Family Noelaerhabdaceae Jerkovic 1970 emend. Young & Bown, 1997 [Gephyrocapsaceae Black 1971]
      - Order †Eiffellithales Rood, Hay & Barnard 1971 (loxolith; imbricating murolith)
        - Family †Chiastozygaceae Rood, Hay & Barnard 1973 [Ahmuellerellaceae Reinhardt, 1965]
        - Family †Eiffellithaceae Reinhardt 1965
        - Family †Rhagodiscaceae Hay 1977
      - Order Stephanolithiales Bown & Young 1997 (protolith; non-imbrication murolith)
        - Family Parhabdolithaceae Bown 1987
        - Family †Stephanolithiaceae Black 1968 emend. Black 1973
      - Order Zygodiscales Young & Bown 1997 [Crepidolithales]
        - Family Helicosphaeraceae Black 1971
        - Family Pontosphaeraceae Lemmermann 1908
        - Family †Zygodiscaceae Hay & Mohler 1967
      - Order Syracosphaerales Ostenfeld 1899 emend. Young et al., 2003 [Rhabdosphaerales Ostenfeld 1899]
        - Family Calciosoleniaceae Kamptner 1927
        - Family Syracosphaeraceae Lohmann, 1902 [Halopappiaceae Kamptner 1928] (caneolith & cyrtolith; murolith)
        - Family Rhabdosphaeraceae Haeckel, 1894 (planolith)
      - Order †Watznaueriales Bown 1987 (imbricating placolith)
        - Family †Watznaueriaceae Rood, Hay & Barnard 1971
      - Order †Arkhangelskiales Bown & Hampton 1997
        - Family †Arkhangelskiellaceae Bukry 1969
        - Family †Kamptneriaceae Bown & Hampton 1997
      - Order †Podorhabdales Rood 1971 [Biscutales Aubry 2009; Prediscosphaerales Aubry 2009] (non-imbricating or radial placolith)
        - Family †Axopodorhabdaceae Wind & Wise 1977 [Podorhabdaceae Noel 1965]
        - Family †Biscutaceae Black, 1971
        - Family †Calyculaceae Noel 1973
        - Family †Cretarhabdaceae Thierstein 1973
        - Family †Mazaganellaceae Bown 1987
        - Family †Prediscosphaeraceae Rood et al., 1971 [Deflandriaceae Black 1968]
        - Family †Tubodiscaceae Bown & Rutledge 1997
      - Order Coccolithales Schwartz 1932 [Coccolithophorales]
        - Family Reticulosphaeraceae Cavalier-Smith 1996 [Reticulosphaeridae]
        - Family Calcidiscaceae Young & Bown 1997
        - Family Coccolithaceae Poche 1913 emend. Young & Bown, 1997 [Coccolithophoraceae]
        - Family Pleurochrysidaceae Fresnel & Billard 1991
        - Family Hymenomonadaceae Senn 1900 [Ochrosphaeraceae Schussnig 1930]
