= Gephyrocapsa pseudohuxleyi =

- SEM of G. pseudohuxleyi coccoliths. Scale bar = 1 μm.

Scientific classification
- Domain: Eukaryota
- Supergroup: Haptista
- Division: Haptophyta
- Class: Prymnesiophyceae
- Order: Isochrysidales
- Family: Noelaerhabdaceae
- Genus: Gephyrocapsa
- Species: G. pseudohuxleyi

Binomial name
- Gephyrocapsa pseudohuxleyi Bendif, Probert, Beaufort, Rickaby & Archontikis, 2023

Species of haptophyte

Gephyrocapsa pseudohuxleyi is a species of marine coccolithophore in the family Noelaerhabdaceae. First distinguished as phylogenetic Clade A2 of the cosmopolitan haptophyte previously classified as Emiliania huxleyi, it was formally established as a distinct species in 2023. It is a pseudocryptic microalga widely distributed across tropical and subtropical oceanic waters.

== Taxonomy and history ==
Gephyrocapsa pseudohuxleyi was delineated following high-resolution genomic and morphological reassessments of the Emiliania huxleyi species complex. Phylogenomic studies demonstrated that the morphospecies formerly known as E. huxleyi comprised three distinct evolutionary lineages within the genus Gephyrocapsa: Clade A1 (reinstated as Gephyrocapsa huxleyi), Clade A2 (established as Gephyrocapsa pseudohuxleyi), and Clade B (reinstated as Gephyrocapsa pujosae). The species name was first proposed by Bendif et al. in The ISME Journal (2023), and was validly published on 14 November 2023.

The holotype was collected off of Peru in the south-eastern Pacific Ocean, from the water's surface. A paratype was collected off of Ecuador in 1991.

== Etymology ==
The etymology of pseudohuxleyi came from the Greek prefix pseudo- ("false" or "resembling") with huxleyi, highlighting its partially cryptic morphological relationship with G. huxleyi.

== Morphology ==
Gephyrocapsa pseudohuxleyi produces coccoliths characterized by a moderately elevated distal shield measuring 2.0 to 4.5 μm in length. The individual shield elements exhibit variable widths ranging from 0.05 to 0.15 μm. The inner tube is of variable and occasionally irregular width.

The central area of the coccolith exhibits structural polymorphism, featuring either:

- A delicate grill composed of curved rods, or
- Thick, solid lath-like plates that may occasionally feature irregular perforations or holes.

== Genomics and evolutionary divergence ==
Genetically, G. pseudohuxleyi represents a distinct lineage (Clade A2) separated from other species of Gephyrocapsa by total genome sequence analyses. It displays a nuclear genomic admixture pattern distinct from both G. huxleyi (Clade A1) and G. pujosae (Clade B). Because some populations of G. pseudohuxleyi are pseudocryptic, genomic comparisons coupled with electron microscopy are required for definitive identification.

== Ecology ==
Gephyrocapsa pseudohuxleyi occurs throughout global oceans at low to mid-latitudes, inhabiting surface waters with monthly sea surface temperatures ranging between 15 °C and 30 °C. During summer months, its range can expand into temperate oceanic waters.

For practical applications in oceanography and ecological monitoring where DNA sequencing or electron microscopy is unavailable, G. pseudohuxleyi, G. huxleyi, and G. pujosae can be accommodated into a broader species complex under G. huxleyi (historically referred to as Emiliania huxleyi).
