= Pseudarmadillo tuberculatus =

Pseudarmadillo tuberculatus Temporal range: Burdigalian?

Scientific classification
- Kingdom: Animalia
- Phylum: Arthropoda
- Class: Malacostraca
- Order: Isopoda
- Suborder: Oniscidea
- Family: Delatorreiidae
- Genus: Pseudarmadillo
- Species: †P. tuberculatus

Binomial name
- †Pseudarmadillo tuberculatus Schmalfuss, 1984

Extinct species of woodlouse

Pseudarmadillo tuberculatus is an extinct species of isopod in the family Delatorreiidae known from a series of possibly Miocene fossils found on Hispaniola. At the time of description P. tuberculatus was one of two Pseudarmadillo species known from the fossil record and one of only two from Hispaniola.

== History and classification ==
P. tuberculatus is known from four isopods, both female and male, all of which are inclusions in three different transparent chunks of Dominican amber. Two of the paratypes are fossils in the same amber specimen while the other two individuals are both in separate amber specimens. The amber specimens which entomb the holotype and paratypes, are currently preserved in the Division of Invertebrate Zoology collections at the Staatliches Museum für Naturkunde Stuttgart in Stuttgart, Germany. The type specimens were collected from an undetermined amber mine, in fossil bearing rocks of the Cordillera Septentrional mountains, northern Dominican Republic. The amber was produced by resin from the extinct tree Hymenaea protera, which formerly grew on Hispaniola, across northern South America and up to southern Mexico. The amber dates from at least the Burdigalian stage of the Miocene, based on studying the associated fossil foraminifera and may be as old as the Middle Eocene, based on the associated fossil coccoliths. This age range is due to the host rock being secondary deposits for the amber, and the Miocene the age range is only the youngest that it might be.

The fossil isopods were first studied by paleontologist Helmut Schmalfuss of the Staatliches Museum für Naturkunde Stuttgart. Schmalfuss's 1984 type description of the new species was published in the journal Stuttgarter Beiträge zur Naturkunde. Serie B (Geologie und Paläontologie) and no explanation of the specific epithet tuberculatus was given. P. tuberculatus is one of the first two species of Pseudarmadillo described from the fossil record, the other species being Pseudarmadillo cristatus. Both are known only from Dominican amber and were described in the same 1984 paper.

== Description ==
The Pseudarmadillo tuberculatus specimens are moderately well preserved, though since isopods lack the wax coatings found in insects, they show deterioration and distortion from the resin after entombment. The species has an estimated adult body length of up to approximately 3.5 millimetres (0.14 in) and a width of 1.5 millimetres (0.059 in). In contrast to P. cristatus which has two ribs running the length of the body on each side, only one rib is on each side of P. tuberculatus. While both species have two rows of bumps running the width of the body between the ribs on each body segment, the front row of bumps is eleven across and the posterior row is ten across in P. tuberculatus rather the row and five and four in P. cristatus. The cephalon has notably enlarged antennal lobes that served to shelter the antenna when an individual curled into a defensive ball. The compound eyes of the species are composed five ommatidia.
