= Tisochrysis lutea =

Scientific classification
- Domain: Eukaryota
- Division: Haptophyta
- Class: Prymnesiophyceae
- Order: Isochrysidales
- Family: Isochrysidaceae
- Genus: Tisochrysis
- Species: T. lutea

Binomial name
- Tisochrysis lutea Bendif et al. 2013

Species of single-celled organism

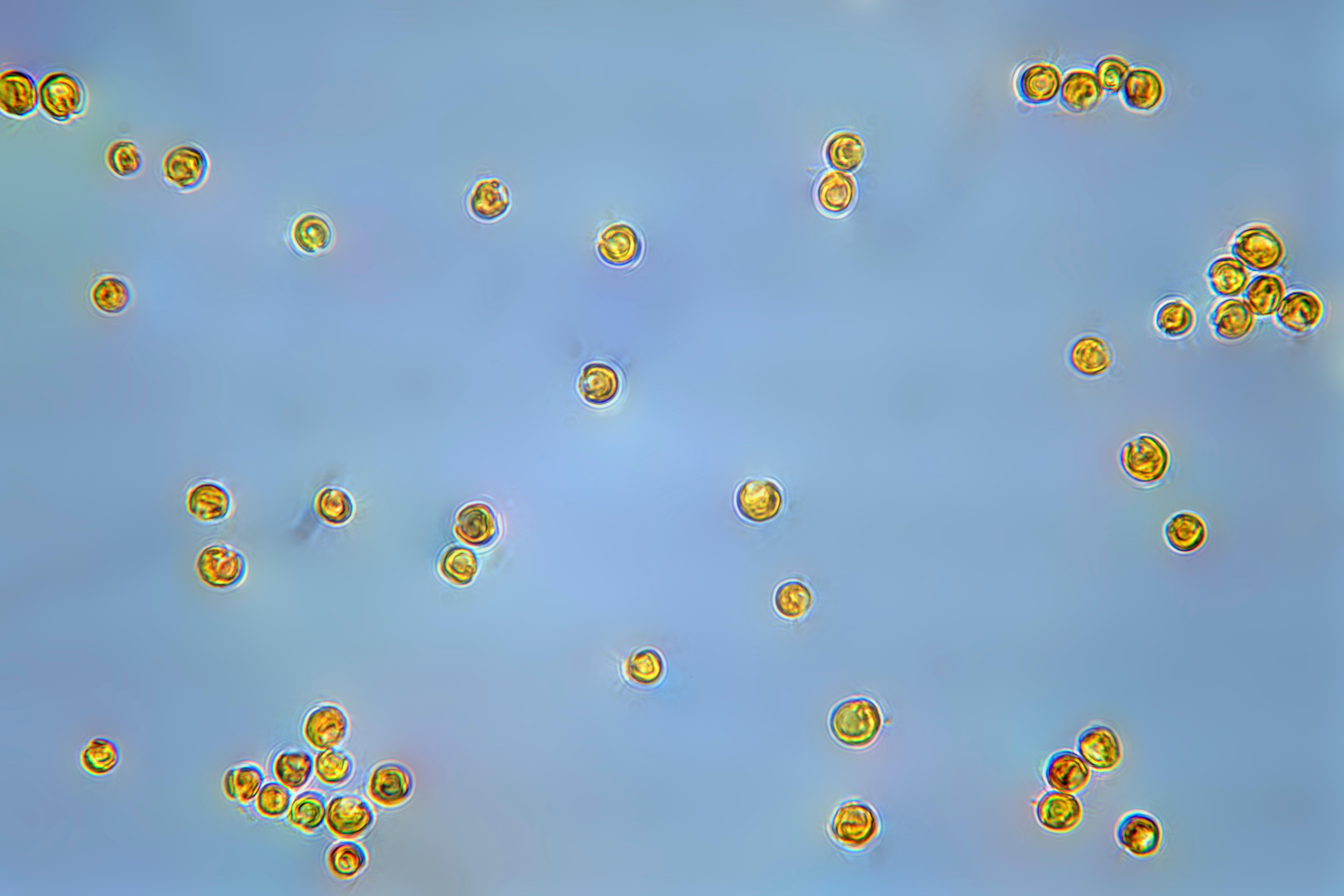
Microscopic view of the microalga Tisochrysis lutea. The yellow color is characteristic and is the reason for the species name.

Tisochrysis lutea is a species of Haptophyta formerly known as Isochrysis affinis galbana (Tahiti isolate) or 'T-iso'.

T. lutea is one of the most widely used species in aquaculture to feed oyster and shrimp larvae. It has an interesting composition for this application because of its high content of polyunsaturated fatty acids such as docosahexaenoic acid (DHA), stearidonic acid and alpha-linolenic acid. T. lutea contains betain lipids and phospholipids.

== Etymology ==
The genus name Tisochrysis comes from the first letter of Tahiti, French Polynesia, where the species is first isolated, and its previous genus Isochrysis. The species name lutea stems from its color. Lutea is the color of saffron yellow in Latin.

== Applications ==
=== Feeds for aquaculture ===
T. lutea was isolated from Tahiti, French Polynesia, by the name Isochrysis affinis galbana (Tahiti isolate) or 'T-iso'. However, by sequence of partial nuclear small subunit (SSU), large subunit rDNA and mitochondrial cytochrome oxidase 1 genes, it was discovered that T. lutea is different from Isochrysis galbana and other Isochrysis spp. isolated from temperate waters . T. lutea was chosen to be feeds for larvae animals for several reasons: First, it has a fast growth rate and a wide physico-chemical tolerance range, which makes it easier to cultivate. Also, its high unsaturated fatty acid is a great merit over other choice of feeds.

=== Dietary Supplement ===
Other than feeding larvae animals, its high omega-3 fatty acids, such as Eicosapentaenoic acid (EPA) and docosahexaenoic acid (DHA), are also candidates for nutraceutical product for human.

T. lutea was tested on obesity and metabolism disease model. It was provided orally to Wistar rats as a long-chain polyunsaturated fatty acid source along with high-fat diet. T. lutea lowered the liver triglyceride and total cholesterol levels and improved lipopolysaccharide serum level. Abdominal and epididymal adipose tissue weight to body weight ratios of high-fat diet Wistar rats are reduced in T. lutea supplemented group, while these ratios were similar between the HF-Tiso group and CTRL rats.

=== Anti-inflammation ===
T. lutea contains fucoxanthin as well. Fucoxanthin, a carotenoid pigment synthesized in brown algae, counter-act on interleukin 6, Arg 1, NLRP3 expression and other inflammatory factor, which reduces inflammation. The methanoic extraction of T. lutea is found to perform better than fucoxanthin alone as an anti-inflammatory ingredient.

Its anti-inflammatory affect is tested on animal models of dry eye syndrome. T. lutea reduced the expression of NF-κB, MAPK, and AKT in vitro in human retinal epithelial ARPE-19 cells. The tear volume was increased and the cornea damage was reduced in vivo.

=== Biodiesel ===
Several research also considered T. lutea as a biodiesel producer candidate because of the abundant fat it can produce. T. lutea grown under nitrogen depletion raise heating value. Its nitrogen concentrations provide specific gravity, kinematic viscosity, iodine value, and cetane number that meet the standards for Europe and the U.S.A.
