= Chrysotila carterae =

Scientific classification
- Domain: Eukaryota
- Supergroup: Haptista
- Division: Haptophyta
- Class: Prymnesiophyceae
- Order: Isochrysidales
- Family: Isochrysidaceae
- Genus: Chrysotila
- Species: C. carterae

Binomial name
- Chrysotila carterae (Braarud & Fagerland) Andersen, Kim, Tittley & Yoon

Synonyms
- Cricosphaera carterae (Braarud & Fagerland) Braarud; Hymenomonas carterae (Braarud & Fagerland) Braarud; Pleurochrysis carterae (Braarud & Fagerland) T.Christensen; Pleurochrysis carterae var. carterae (Braarud & Fagerland) T.Christensen; Syracosphaera brandtii J.Schiller; Syracosphaera carterae Braarud & Fargerland

Species of single-celled organism

Chrysotila carterae is a marine species of unicellular coccolithophorid algae that has the ability to calcify subcellularly. They produce calcified scales, known as coccoliths, which are deposited on the surface of the cell resulting in the formation of a coccosphere. Chrysotila carterae produce heterococcoliths which are composed of crystal units of variable shapes and sizes.

== See also ==
- Algaculture
- Vitamin B12
