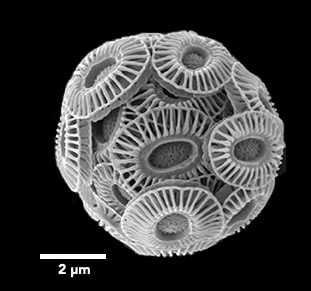
- A scanning electron micrograph of a single G. huxleyi cell

Scientific classification
- Domain: Eukaryota
- Supergroup: Haptista
- Division: Haptophyta
- Class: Prymnesiophyceae
- Order: Isochrysidales
- Family: Noelaerhabdaceae
- Genus: Gephyrocapsa
- Species: G. huxleyi

Binomial name
- Gephyrocapsa huxleyi (Lohmann) P.Reinhardt, 1972

Synonyms
- Coccolithus huxleyi (Lohmann) Kamptner, 1943; Emiliania huxleyi (Lohmann) W.W.Hay & H.Mohler, 1967; Hymenomonas huxleyi (Lohmann) Kamptner, 1930; Pontosphaera huxleyi Lohmann, 1902

= Gephyrocapsa huxleyi =

Unicellular algae responsible for the formation of chalk

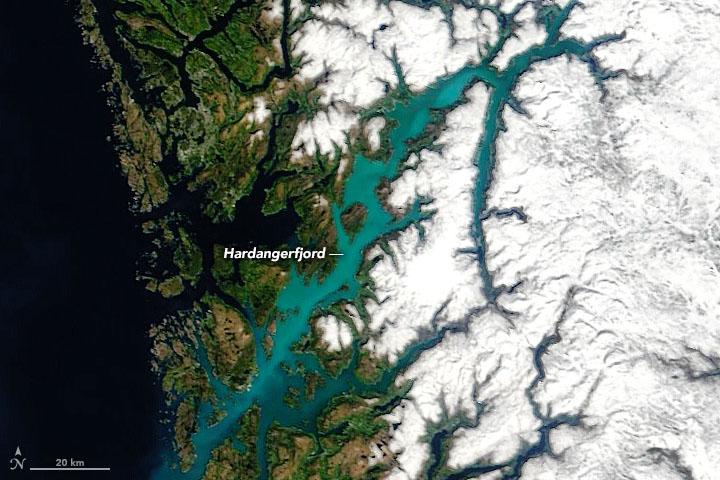
Bloom of G. huxleyi in Hardangerfjord, Norway, May 2020

Gephyrocapsa huxleyi, also called Emiliania huxleyi, is the most abundant species of coccolithophore in modern oceans found in almost all ecosystems from the equator to sub-polar regions, and from nutrient rich upwelling zones to nutrient poor oligotrophic waters. It is one of thousands of different photosynthetic plankton that freely drift in the photic zone of the ocean, forming the basis of virtually all marine food webs. It is studied for the extensive blooms it forms in nutrient-depleted waters after the reformation of the summer thermocline. Like other coccolithophores, G. huxleyi is a single-celled phytoplankton covered with uniquely ornamented calcite disks called coccoliths. Individual coccoliths are abundant in marine sediments, although complete coccospheres are more unusual. In the case of G. huxleyi, not only the shell, but also the soft part of the organism may be recorded in sediments. It produces a group of chemical compounds that are very resistant to decomposition. These chemical compounds, known as alkenones, can be found in marine sediments long after other soft parts of the organisms have decomposed. Alkenones are most commonly used by earth scientists as a means to estimate past sea surface temperatures.

== Nomenclature ==
The names Emiliania huxleyi and Gephyrocapsa huxleyi are both valid under the International Code of Nomenclature. Use of G. huxleyi has increased but is not followed by all workers (see e.g. Nannotax website).

== Basic facts ==
Emiliania huxleyi was named after Thomas Huxley and Cesare Emiliani, who were the first to examine sea-bottom sediment and discover the coccoliths within it. It is believed to have evolved approximately 270,000 years ago from the older genus Gephyrocapsa Kampter and became dominant in planktonic assemblages, and thus in the fossil record, approximately 70,000 years ago. The species is divided into seven morphological forms called morphotypes based on differences in coccolith structure (See Nannotax for more detail on these forms). Its coccoliths are transparent and commonly colourless, but are formed of calcite which refracts light very efficiently in the water column. This, and the high concentrations caused by continual shedding of their coccoliths makes G. huxleyi blooms easily visible from space. Satellite images show that blooms can cover areas of more than 10,000 km$^2$, with complementary shipboard measurements indicating that G. huxleyi is by far the dominant phytoplankton species under these conditions. This species has been an inspiration for James Lovelock's Gaia hypothesis which claims that living organisms collectively self-regulate biogeochemistry and climate at nonrandom metastable states.

== Abundance and distribution ==
Emiliania huxleyi is considered a ubiquitous species. It exhibits one of the largest temperature ranges (1–30 °C) of any coccolithophores species. It has been observed under a range of nutrient levels from oligotrophic (subtropical gyres) to eutrophic waters (upwelling zones/ Norwegian fjords). Its presence in plankton communities from the surface to 200m depth indicates a high tolerance for both fluctuating and low light conditions. This extremely wide tolerance of environmental conditions is believed to be explained by the existence of a range of environmentally adapted ecotypes within the species. As a result of these tolerances its distribution ranges from the sub-Arctic to the sub-Antarctic and from coastal to oceanic habitats. Within this range it is present in nearly all euphotic zone water samples and accounts for 20–50% or more of the total coccolithophore community.

During massive blooms (which can cover over 100,000 square kilometers), G. huxleyi cell concentrations can outnumber those of all other species in the region combined, accounting for 75% or more of the total number of photosynthetic plankton in the area. G. huxleyi blooms regionally act as an important source of calcium carbonate and dimethyl sulfide, the massive production of which can have a significant impact not only on the properties of the surface mixed layer, but also on global climate. The blooms can be identified through satellite imagery because of the large amount of light back-scattered from the water column, which provides a method to assess their biogeochemical importance on both basin and global scales. These blooms are prevalent in the Norwegian fjords, causing satellites to pick up "white waters", which describes the reflectance of the blooms picked up by satellites. This is due to the mass of coccoliths reflecting the incoming sunlight back out of the water, allowing the extent of G. huxleyi blooms to be distinguished in fine detail.

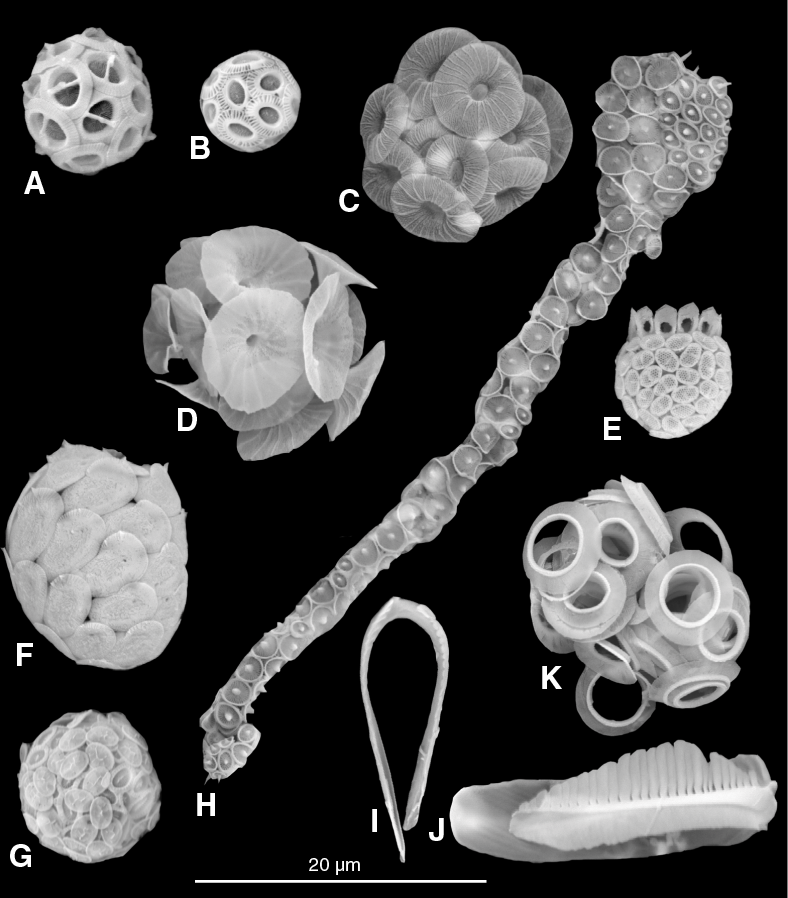
Common coccolithophores from samples in the Maldives including G. huxleyi (B)

Extensive G. huxleyi blooms can have a visible impact on sea albedo. While multiple scattering can increase light path per unit depth, increasing absorption and solar heating of the water column, G. huxleyi has inspired proposals for geomimesis, because micron-sized air bubbles are specular reflectors, and so in contrast to G. huxleyi, tend to lower the temperature of the upper water column. As with self-shading within water-whitening coccolithophore plankton blooms, this may reduce photosynthetic productivity by altering the geometry of the euphotic zone. Both experiments and modeling are needed to quantify the potential biological impact of such effects, and the corollary potential of reflective blooms of other organisms to increase or reduce evaporation and methane evolution by altering fresh water temperatures.

== Climate change ==
Coccolithophores such as G. huxleyi are important to the process of ocean calcification globally; these organisms additionally play a role in long-term carbon fluxes. They fix carbon through photosynthesis, a process known as the biological carbon pump, and release carbon dioxide when coccoliths are formed. These processes therefore influence the biogeochemistry of the surface ocean.

Consequently, the now increasing phenomenon of ocean acidification can affect these organisms and their biological activity. As ocean acidification increases with increasing concentrations of carbon dioxide in the atmosphere, calcification by coccolithophores such as G. huxleyi can be impacted. Various studies found that increased atmospheric carbon dioxide concentrations may lead to decreased calcification by G. huxleyi. However, there is still uncertainty present regarding the degree to which calcification may be impacted, as some strains appear to be less sensitive to ocean acidification.

Often considered as a phytoplankton, contributing to primary production, this organism is actually a mixoplankton, capable of consuming bacteria. G. huxleyi through photosynthesis is a sink of carbon dioxide. However, the production of coccoliths through calcification is a source of CO_{2}. This means that coccolithophores, including G. huxleyi, have the potential to act as a net source of CO_{2} out of the ocean. Whether they are a net source or sink and how they will react to ocean acidification is not yet well understood.

Beyond the direct impacts to the organisms themselves, increased atmospheric carbon dioxide concentrations and therefore lower ocean pH may affect carbon cycling in the ocean. A study analyzing effects of high carbon dioxide and low pH on G. huxleyi found that PIC (particulate inorganic carbon) to POC (particulate organic carbon) ratios decreases for G. huxleyi. Under more acidic oceanic conditions, this decrease has the potential to affect export of carbon. The reasons for this decrease include a reduced calcite saturation state and disruptions to homeostasis in lower pH conditions.

== Biogeochemical impacts ==
=== Ocean heat retention ===
Scattering stimulated by G. huxleyi blooms not only causes more heat and light to be pushed back up into the atmosphere than usual, but also cause more of the remaining heat to be trapped closer to the ocean surface. This is problematic because it is the surface water that exchanges heat with the atmosphere, and G. huxleyi blooms may tend to make the overall temperature of the water column dramatically cooler over longer time periods. However, the importance of this effect, whether positive or negative, is currently being researched and has not yet been established.

== Gallery ==
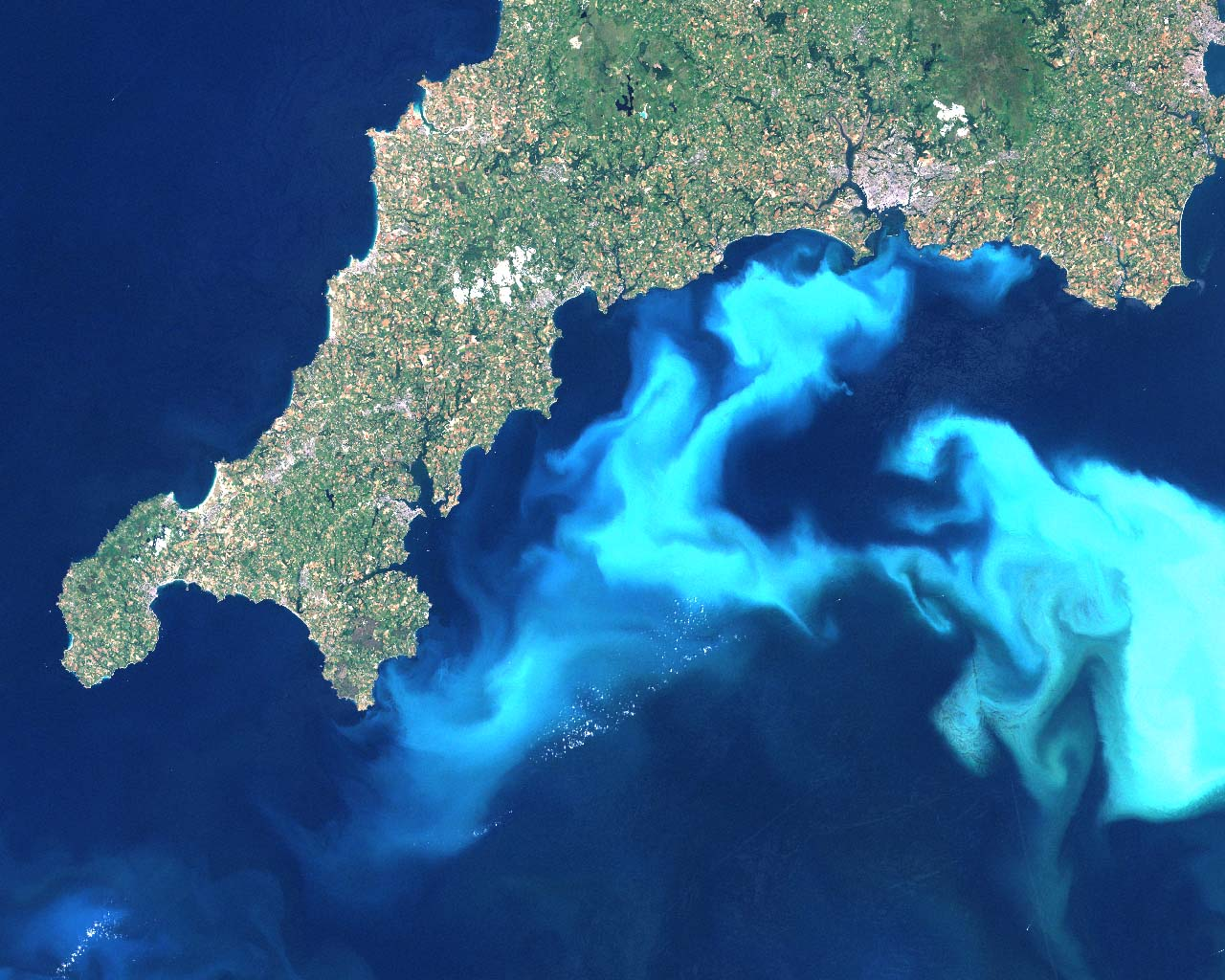
Landsat image of a 1999 G. huxleyi bloom in the English Channel off Cornwall.

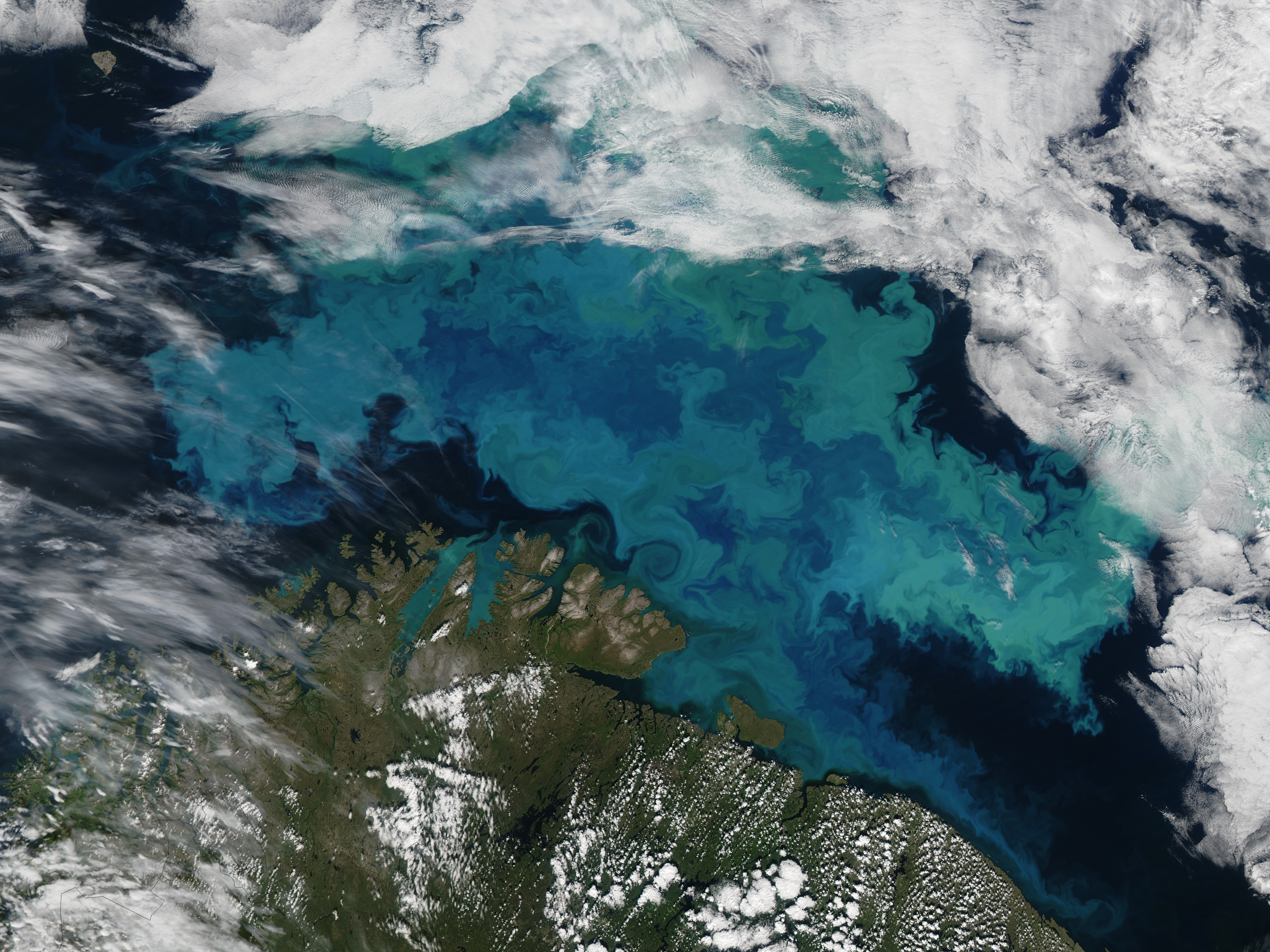
G. huxleyi bloom in the Barents Sea.

== See also ==
- CLAW hypothesis
- Dimethylsulfoniopropionate
- Emiliania huxleyi virus 86, a marine virus that infects G. huxleyi
