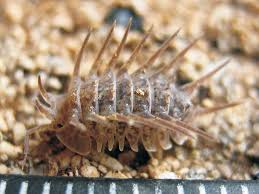

Scientific classification
- Kingdom: Animalia
- Phylum: Arthropoda
- Class: Malacostraca
- Order: Isopoda
- Suborder: Oniscidea
- Family: Delatorreiidae
- Genus: Cuzcodinella
- Species: C. alejandroi

Binomial name
- Cuzcodinella alejandroi (Luis F. de Armas, 2016)

= Cuzcodinella alejandroi =

Species of terrestrial isopod native to Cuba

Cuzcodinella alejandroi is a rare species of woodlouse found in the Holguín Province of Cuba. It is one of only two species in the genus Cuzcodinella, along with Cuzcodinella oryx.

== Description ==
The species is approximately 7 to 10 mm in length, with a spotted pattern and large, curved, rearward facing spines protruding from its head, thorax, and abdomen.

== Distribution and habitat ==
The species was found inhabiting the cavities within limestone rocks and beneath leaf litter at the base of mountains in Holguín Province. The species' close proximity and similarity to Cuzcodinella oryx suggests ecological barriers like metamorphic soil led to speciation.
