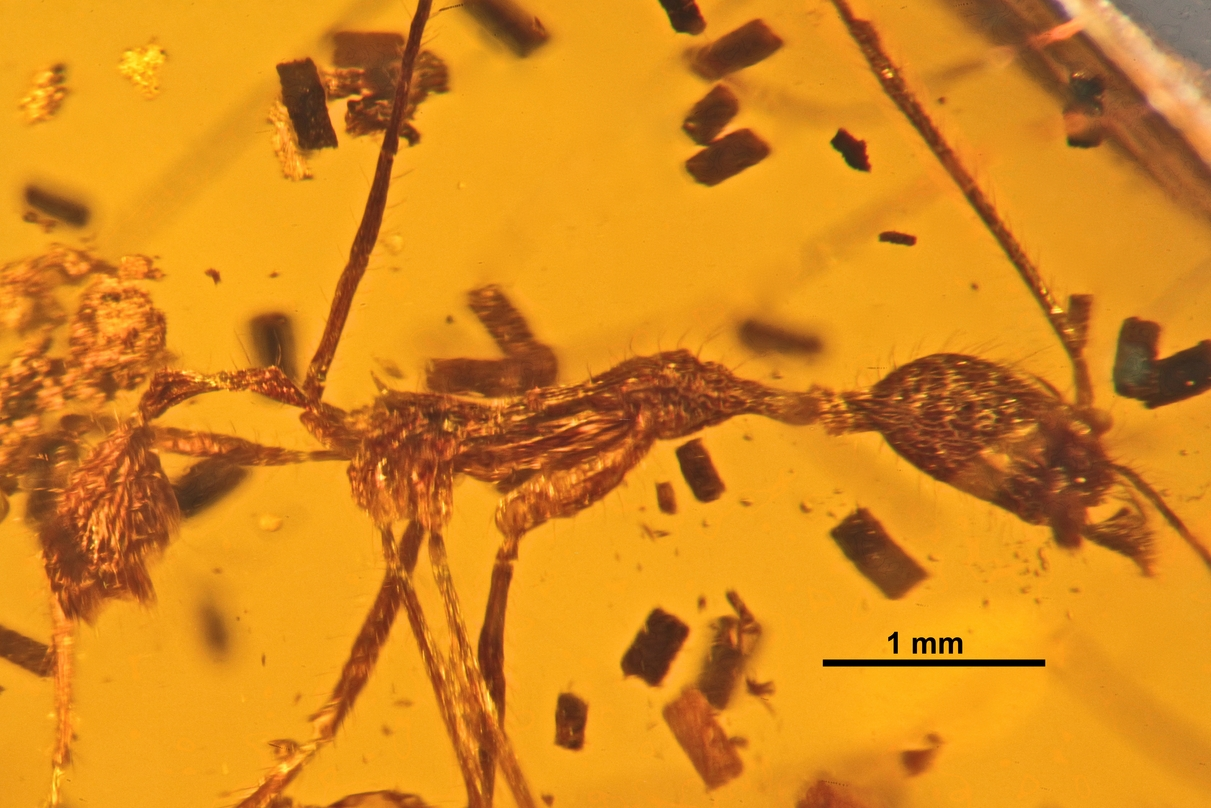
- Aphaenogaster amphioceanica holotype

Scientific classification
- Domain: Eukaryota
- Kingdom: Animalia
- Phylum: Arthropoda
- Class: Insecta
- Order: Hymenoptera
- Family: Formicidae
- Subfamily: Myrmicinae
- Genus: Aphaenogaster
- Species: †A. amphioceanica

Binomial name
- †Aphaenogaster amphioceanica De Andrade, 1995

= Aphaenogaster amphioceanica =

Aphaenogaster amphioceanica Temporal range: Burdigalian?

Extinct species of ant

Aphaenogaster amphioceanica is an extinct species of ant in the subfamily Myrmicinae known from a single possibly Miocene fossil found in amber on Hispaniola. At the time of description A. amphioceanica was one of two Aphaenogaster species known from the Caribbean islands.

== History and classification ==
Aphaenogaster amphioceanica is known from a solitary fossil insect which is an inclusion in a transparent chunk of Dominican amber along with a spider, a mite, and six woodlice. The amber was produced by the extinct Hymenaea protera, which formerly grew on Hispaniola, across northern South America and up to southern Mexico. The amber specimen, number Do-4629-B; which entombs the holotype, is currently preserved in the Division of Invertebrate Zoology collections at the Staatliches Museum für Naturkunde Stuttgart in Stuttgart, Germany. The holotype was collected from an undetermined amber mine, in fossil bearing rocks of the Cordillera Septentrional mountains, northern Dominican Republic. The amber dates from at least the Burdigalian stage of the Miocene (16-20 Ma), based on studying the associated fossil foraminifera and may be as old as the Middle Eocene (about 40 Ma), based on the associated fossil coccoliths. This age range is due to the host rock being secondary deposits for the amber, and the Miocene age range is only the youngest that it might be.

The fossil ant was first studied by paleoentomologist Maria De Andrade of the University of Basel. De Andrade's 1995 type description of the new species was published in the Swiss journal Stuttgarter Beiträge zur Naturkunde. Serie B (Geologie und Paläontologie). The specific epithet amphioceanica is a combination of the Greek "amphi" meaning around and "oceanicus" meaning of the ocean in reference to the Caribbean and the Indo-Pacific, aince the nearest related species are found in the Indomalayan realm. The six woodlice were described as paratypes of the extinct species Pseudarmadillo cristatus in 1984.

== Description ==
The Aphaenogaster amphioceanica specimen is well preserved, though the ant shows distortion from the amber moving after entombment. The specimen has an estimated body length of approximately 5.36 millimetres (0.211 in). The overall coloration of A. amphioceanica is a moderately shining light brown, with the legs slightly lighter in tone. The head is oval in shape with a "neck" that is slightly shorter than the neck. The antennae have a long scape that extends for 3/5 of its length past the back of the head capsule and the four end segments form the antennal club. Large distinct ribs are found on the lateral sides of the antenna sockets on the head capsule. The propodium is notable in having two spines 0.16 millimetres (0.0063 in) long that point upwards and backwards. The combination of "neck", antenna socket ridges and short sharp spines on the propodeum are unique. The antenna socket morphology is closest to that of several living species found in the Indomalaysian region.
