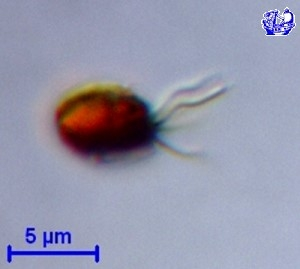
- Isochrysis galbana

Scientific classification
- Domain: Eukaryota
- Clade: Haptista
- Division: Haptophyta
- Class: Prymnesiophyceae
- Order: Isochrysidales
- Family: Isochrysidaceae
- Genus: Isochrysis; Parke, 1949

= Isochrysis =

Genus of single-celled organisms

Isochrysis is a genus of haptophytes. Until recently this genus was also thought to contain the 'T-iso' algae frequently used in aquaculture; that species has been reclassified as Tisochrysis lutea.

== Species ==
There are six species:

- Isochrysis galbana
- Isochrysis litoralis
- Isochrysis maritima
- Isochrysis nuda
- Isochrysis santou – uncertain taxonomic status
- Isochrysis zhanjiangensis
