= Emiliani =

Emiliani is a surname. Notable people with the surname include:

- Gerolamo Emiliani (1481–1537), Italian humanitarian
- Cesare Emiliani (1922–1995), Italian-American scientist, micropaleontologist, and geologist
