= Emiliania (coccolithophore) =

Scientific classification
- Domain: Eukaryota
- Division: Haptophyta
- Class: Prymnesiophyceae
- Order: Isochrysidales
- Family: Noelaerhabdaceae
- Genus: Emiliania; Hay & Mohler

Genus of single-celled organisms

Emiliania is a global coccolithophorid genus.

The genus name of Emiliania is in honour of Cesare Emiliani (1922–1995), who was an Italian-American scientist, geologist, micropaleontologist, and founder of paleoceanography, developing the timescale of marine isotope stages.

The genus was circumscribed by Hanspeter Mohler and William Winn Hay in Trans. Gulf Coast Ass. Geol. Soc. Vol.17 on page 447 in 1967.

It formerly included the species Emiliania huxleyi, now called Gephyrocapsa huxleyi.
