= Chrysotila =

Scientific classification
- Domain: Eukaryota
- Supergroup: Haptista
- Division: Haptophyta
- Class: Prymnesiophyceae
- Order: Isochrysidales
- Family: Isochrysidaceae
- Genus: Chrysotila; Anand, 1937

Synonyms
- Pleurochrysis Pringsheim, 1955; Ruttnera Geitler, 1942

Genus of single-celled organisms

Chrysotila is a genus of haptophytes.

Species:

- Chrysotila carterae (Braarud & Fagerland) Andersen, Kim, Tittley & Yoon, 2014
- Chrysotila dentata (J.R.Johansen & G.J.Doucette) R.A.Andersen, J.I.Kim, Tittley & H.S.Yoon, 2015
- Chrysotila elongata (Droop) Andersen, J.T.Kim, Tittley & H.S.Yoon, 2014
- Chrysotila haptonemofera (Inouye & Chihara) R.A.Andersen, J.I.Kim, Tittley & H.S.Yoon, 2014
- Chrysotila placolithoides (J.Fresnel & C.Billard) R.A.Andersen, J.I.Kim, Tittley & H.S.Yoon, 2014
- Chrysotila pseudoroscoffensis (Gayral & Fresnel) R.A.Andersen, J.I.Kim, Tittley & H.S.Yoon, 2015
- Chrysotila roscoffensis (P.A.Dangeard) R.A.Andersen, J.I.Kim, Tittley & H.S.Yoon, 2015
- Chrysotila scherffelii (Pringsheim) R.A.Andersen, J.I.Kim, Tittley & H.S.Yoon, 2014
- Chrysotila stipitata Anand, 1936
