= Dicrateria =

Scientific classification
- Domain: Eukaryota
- Clade: Diaphoretickes
- Phylum: Haptista
- Subphylum: Haptophytina
- Class: Coccolithophyceae
- Order: Isochrysidales
- Family: Isochrysidaceae
- Genus: Dicrateria; Parke, 1949

Genus of algae

Dicrateria is a genus of haptophytes, comprising the three species Dicrateria gilva, Dicrateria inornata, and Dicrateria vlkianum.
