= Pseudarmadillo =

Pseudarmadillo Temporal range: Burdigalian? - Recent

Scientific classification
- Kingdom: Animalia
- Phylum: Arthropoda
- Clade: Pancrustacea
- Class: Malacostraca
- Order: Isopoda
- Suborder: Oniscidea
- Family: Delatorreiidae
- Genus: Pseudarmadillo; Saussure, 1857

Type species
- Pseudarmadillo carinulatus Saussure, 1857

Genus of woodlice

Pseudarmadillo is a genus of woodlice from the Greater Antilles.

== Species ==
All extant species live in Cuba, with one species also extending to the Bahamas:

- Pseudarmadillo agramontino Armas & Juarrero de Varona, 1999 – Camagüey Province
- Pseudarmadillo assoi Armas & Juarrero de Varona, 1999 – Cienfuegos Province
- Pseudarmadillo auritus Armas & Juarrero de Varona, 1999 – Sancti Spíritus Province
- Pseudarmadillo bidentatus Armas & Juarrero de Varona, 1999 – Guantánamo Province
- Pseudarmadillo buscki Boone, 1934 – La Habana Province
- Pseudarmadillo carinulatus Saussure, 1857 – Cuba and the Bahamas
- Pseudarmadillo elegans Armas & Juarrero de Varona, 1999 – Isla de la Juventud
- Pseudarmadillo gillianus Richardson, 1902 – La Habana Province, Isla de la Juventud
- Pseudarmadillo holguinensis Armas & Juarrero de Varona, 1999 – Holguín Province
- Pseudarmadillo hoplites (Boone, 1934) – Camagüey Province
- Pseudarmadillo jaumei Armas & Juarrero de Varona, 1999 – Guantánamo Province
- Pseudarmadillo maiteae Juarrero de Varona & Armas, 2002 – Santiago de Cuba Province
- Pseudarmadillo mitratus Armas & Juarrero de Varona, 1999 – Las Tunas Province
- Pseudarmadillo nanus Armas & Juarrero de Varona, 1999 – Cienfuegos Province
- Pseudarmadillo spinosus Armas & Juarrero de Varona, 1999 – Sancti Spíritus Province
- Pseudarmadillo vansicklei Juarrero de Varona & Armas, 2003 – Santiago de Cuba Province

Two extinct species are also known from possibly Burdigalian age Dominican amber found on Hispaniola:

- †P. cristatus Schmalfuss, 1984
- †P. tuberculatus Schmalfuss, 1984

== Taxonomy ==
This genus is placed in Delatorreiidae alongside the genus Cuzcodinella. The type species of the family, Delatorreia, is a synonym of Pseudarmadillo. Although Pseudarmadillo was described before Delatorreia and therefore has naming priority, the family name Delatorreiidae was coined before the family name Pseudarmadillidae was derived from Pseudarmadillo, so the former family name had priority.
