= Pseudarmadillo cristatus =

Pseudarmadillo cristatus Temporal range: Burdigalian?

Scientific classification
- Kingdom: Animalia
- Phylum: Arthropoda
- Clade: Pancrustacea
- Class: Malacostraca
- Order: Isopoda
- Suborder: Oniscidea
- Family: Delatorreiidae
- Genus: Pseudarmadillo
- Species: †P. cristatus

Binomial name
- †Pseudarmadillo cristatus Schmalfuss, 1984

Extinct species of woodlouse

Pseudarmadillo cristatus is an extinct species of isopod (woodlouse) in the family Delatorreiidae known from a series of possibly Miocene fossils found on Hispaniola. At the time of description P. cristatus was one of two Pseudarmadillo species known from the fossil record and one of only two from Hispaniola.

== History and classification ==
Pseudarmadillo cristatus is known from ten isopods of various developmental stages and both female and male all of which are inclusions in five different transparent chunks of Dominican amber. Six of the paratypes are in the same amber specimen as a spider, a mite, and a myrmicine ant, while the two juvenile paratypes are in a single amber also. The amber specimens which entomb the holotype and paratypes, are currently preserved in the Division of Invertebrate Zoology collections at the Staatliches Museum für Naturkunde Stuttgart in Stuttgart, Germany. The type specimens were collected from an undetermined amber mine, in fossil bearing rocks of the Cordillera Septentrional mountains, northern Dominican Republic. The amber was produced by the extinct Hymenaea protera, which formerly grew on Hispaniola, across northern South America and up to southern Mexico. The amber dates from at least the Burdigalian stage of the Miocene, based on studying the associated fossil foraminifera and may be as old as the Middle Eocene, based on the associated fossil coccoliths. This age range is due to the host rock being secondary deposits for the amber, and the Miocene the age range is only the youngest that it might be.

The fossil isopods were first studied by paleontologist Helmut Schmalfuss of the Staatliches Museum für Naturkunde Stuttgart. Schmalfuss's 1984 type description of the new species was published in the journal Stuttgarter Beiträge zur Naturkunde. Serie B (Geologie und Paläontologie) and no explanation of the specific epithet cristatus was given. The 6 paratypes entombed in the same amber are accompanied by the Aphaenogaster amphioceanica holotype ant.

== Description ==
The Pseudarmadillo cristatus specimens are moderately well preserved, though since isopods lack the wax coatings found in insects, they show deterioration and distortion from the resin after entombment. The specimens has an estimated adult body length of approximately 2.5 millimetres (0.098 in) and a width of 1.1 millimetres (0.043 in). The body shows two ribs running the length of the body on each side. Two rows of bumps run the width of the body between the ribs on each body segment, a front row of five bumps and a hind row of four bumps. The cephalon has notably enlarged antennal lobes that served to shelter the antenna when an individual curled into a defensive ball. The compound eyes of the species are composed five ommatidia.
