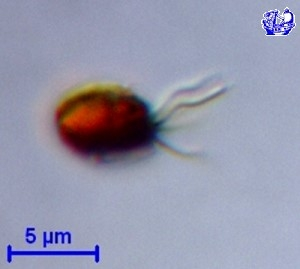

Scientific classification
- Domain: Eukaryota
- Clade: Haptista
- Division: Haptophyta
- Class: Prymnesiophyceae
- Order: Isochrysidales
- Family: Isochrysidaceae
- Genus: Isochrysis
- Species: I. galbana

Binomial name
- Isochrysis galbana Parke

= Isochrysis galbana =

Species of single-celled organism

Isochrysis galbana is a species of Haptophyta. It is the type species of the genus Isochrysis. It is an outstanding food for various bivalve larvae and is now widely cultured for use in the bivalve aquaculture industry. This unicellular is investigated for its high amount of fucoxanthin (18.23 mg/g dried sample). The Isochrysis galbana extract is said to have certain cosmetic and hair-growth properties when using hexane, ethyl acetate, ethanol, water, methanol, or isopropanol as extractants. I. galbana has a chloroplast, whose genome sequence has been published in 2020.
