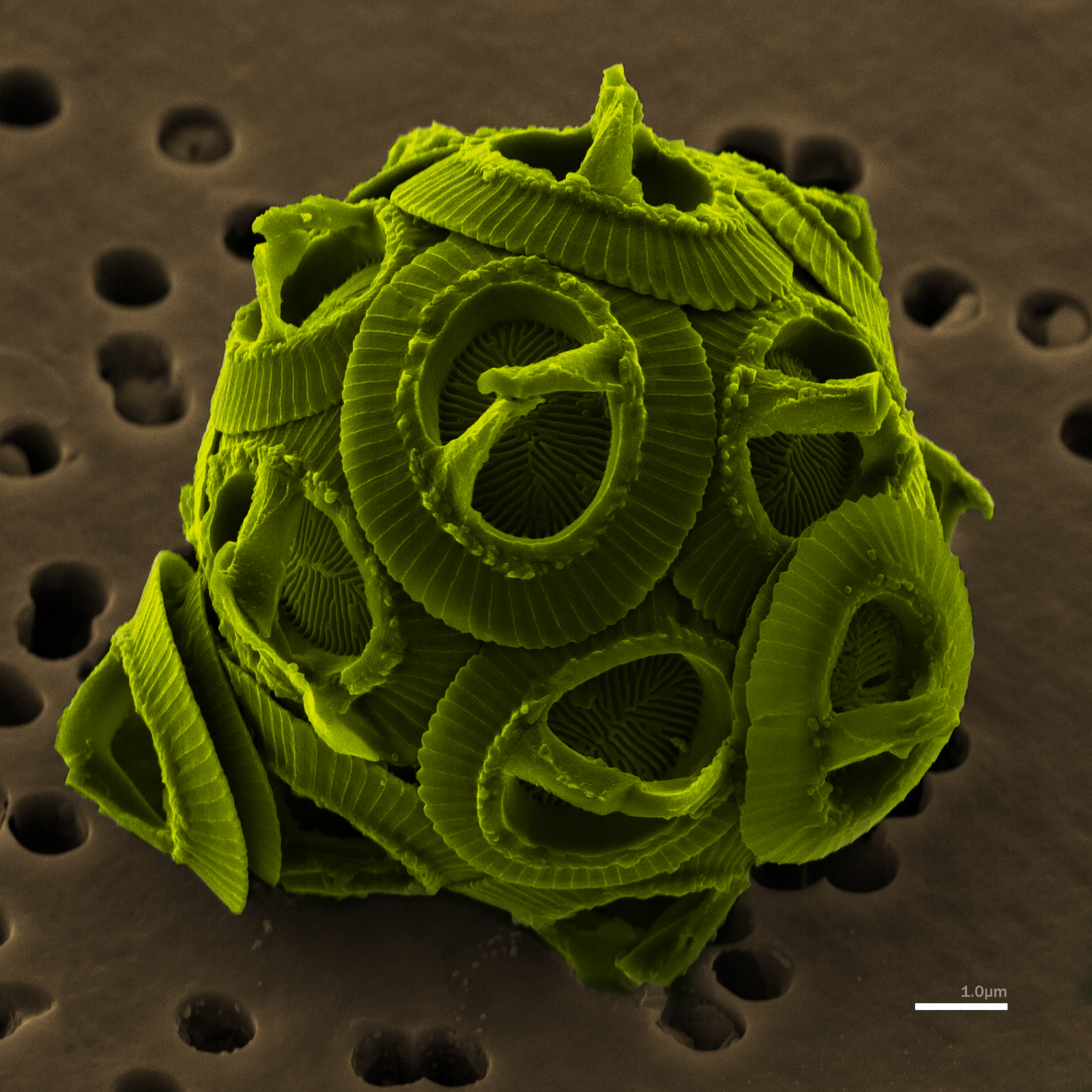
- Gephyrocapsa oceanica

Scientific classification
- Domain: Eukaryota
- Supergroup: Haptista
- Division: Haptophyta
- Class: Prymnesiophyceae
- Order: Isochrysidales
- Family: Noelaerhabdaceae
- Genus: Gephyrocapsa; Kamptner, 1943

= Gephyrocapsa =

Genus of single-celled organisms

Gephyrocapsa is a genus of haptophytes.

== Species ==
Some species include:

- Gephyrocapsa caribbeanica
- Gephyrocapsa crassipons
- Gephyrocapsa ericsonii
- Gephyrocapsa huxleyi
- Gephyrocapsa kamptneri
- Gephyrocapsa muellerae
- Gephyrocapsa oceanica
- Gephyrocapsa ornata
- Gephyrocapsa protohuxleyi
- Gephyrocapsa pseudohuxleyi
