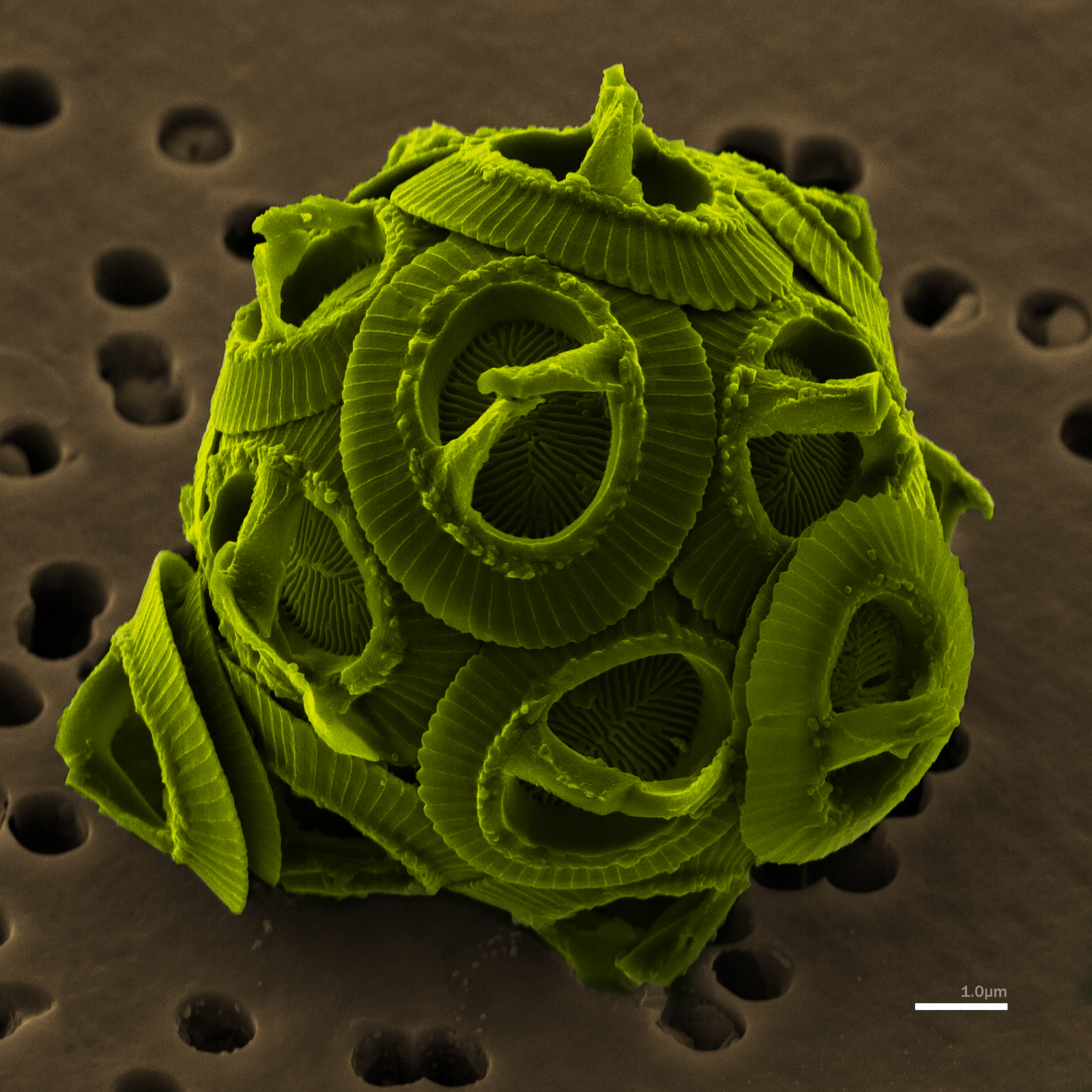

Scientific classification
- Domain: Eukaryota
- Supergroup: Haptista
- Division: Haptophyta
- Class: Prymnesiophyceae
- Order: Isochrysidales
- Family: Noelaerhabdaceae
- Genus: Gephyrocapsa
- Species: G. oceanica

Binomial name
- Gephyrocapsa oceanica Kamptner, 1943

Synonyms
- Coccolithus oceanicus (Kamptner) Kamptner, 1955; Coccolithus doronicoides M.Black & B.Barnes, 1961; Crenalithus doronicoides (M.Black & B.Barnes) P.H.Roth, 1973

= Gephyrocapsa oceanica =

Species of single-celled organism

Gephyrocapsa oceanica is a species of coccolithophorid. It is the type species of the genus Gephyrocapsa. Gephyrocapsa oceanica was first describe by Kamptner in 1943. Since its first description, G. oceanica has emerged as a crucial species in coccolithophore research, regularly used for morphometric variation and biostratigraphy analysis due to the distinct, stable and distinctive structural characteristics of its coccolith. A defining characteristic of Gephyrocapsa is the presence of a bridge spanning the central area of the coccolith. G. oceanica is a unicellular photosynthetic protist with a spherical coccosphere made up of many calcite platelets known as coccoliths. It is one of the largest members of the genus, with an average diameter of 6–10 µm and individual coccoliths ranging in length from 3.5 to 6 µm. In contrast to species like G. caribbeanica and G. muellerae that have thinner or more axial bridges, G. oceanica has a broad, well-developed bridge that is oriented at a significant angle with respect to the long axis of the coccolith. Bridge angle and coccolith size remain two of the primary morphological traits used to delineate species within the genus. The species is an important Pleistocene biostratigraphic marker. G. oceanica's evolutionary importance comes from its status as one of the first known bridge-bearing species in the fossil record. The genus Reticulofenestra, whose coccoliths lacked a central bridge, dominated marine deposits from the late Miocene to the early Pleistocene. The emergence of Gephyrocapsa marked a significant morphological change, signifying the evolutionary shift from forms without bridges to coccoliths with bridges. G. oceanica belongs to an early stage of this transition, according to genetic and fossil evidence. G. oceanica thrived between 200 and 400 ka during the mid-Pleistocene, especially in the Indian and South Atlantic oceans. Strong ecological stability and effective adaptation to warm, nutrient-rich conditions are suggested by its persistence over several hundred thousand years without significant morphological change. But after around 300 ka, Gephyrocapsa huxleyi appeared and quickly spread, overtaking it as the most prevalent coccolithophore in contemporary oceans. Although G. oceanica has persisted in thriving in warm, coastal, and nutrient-enriched seas to this day, this turnover is thought to be a reaction to global cooling and ocean reconfiguration near the end of the Pleistocene.

The biogeographic distribution of modern G. oceanica is both cosmopolitan and tropical–subtropical. In line with field studies from equatorial and subtropical regions, culture-based physiological investigations demonstrate that G. oceanica thrive best at temperatures over 20°C .

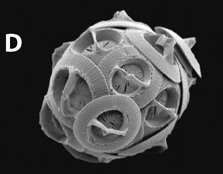
Scanning electron microscopy (SEM) of Gephyrocapsa oceanica
