= Reticulofenestra =

Scientific classification
- Domain: Eukaryota
- Clade: Haptista
- Division: Haptophyta
- Class: Prymnesiophyceae
- Order: Isochrysidales
- Family: Noelaerhabdaceae
- Genus: Reticulofenestra; W.W.Hay, Mohler & M.Wade, 1966

Genus of haptophytes

Reticulofenestra is a genus of calcareous nannoplankton belonging to the haptophyte group. It first emerged during the early Eocene and underwent rapid expansion following the Early Eocene Climatic Optimum—a period characterized by elevated CO_{2}, global warmth and ocean stratification.

== Species ==
Some of the species as listed in nannotax include:

- R. calicis
- R. pseudoumbilicus
- R. haqii
- R. minuta
- R. minutula
- R. asanoi
- R. kahniae
- R. rotaria
- R. pospichalii
- R. sessilis
- R. abisectus
- R. bukryi
- R. floridanus
- R. luminis
- R. parvus
- R. bisecta
- R. filewiczii
- R. stavensis
- R. magniscutum
- R. dictyoda
