= Coccolith =

Calcium carbonate scales covering some phytoplankton species

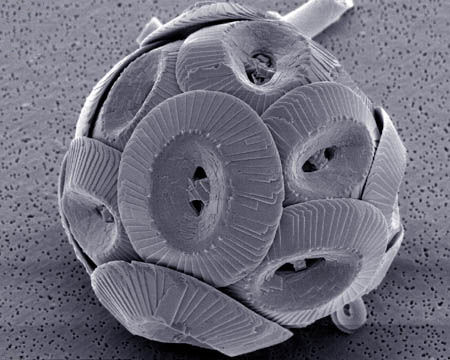
Scanning electron micrograph of Coccolithus pelagicus, plated with coccoliths

Coccoliths are individual plates or scales of calcium carbonate formed by coccolithophores (single-celled phytoplankton such as Emiliania huxleyi) and cover the cell surface arranged in the form of a spherical shell, called a coccosphere.

== Overview ==
Coccoliths, which are about 2 to 25 micrometres across, enclose coccolithophores, which are spherical cells about 5-100 micrometres across. Coccolithophores are an important group of about 200 marine phytoplankton species which cover themselves with a calcium carbonate shell called a "coccosphere". They are ecologically and biogeochemically important but the reason why they calcify remains elusive. One key function may be that the coccosphere offers protection against microzooplankton predation, which is one of the main causes of phytoplankton death in the ocean.

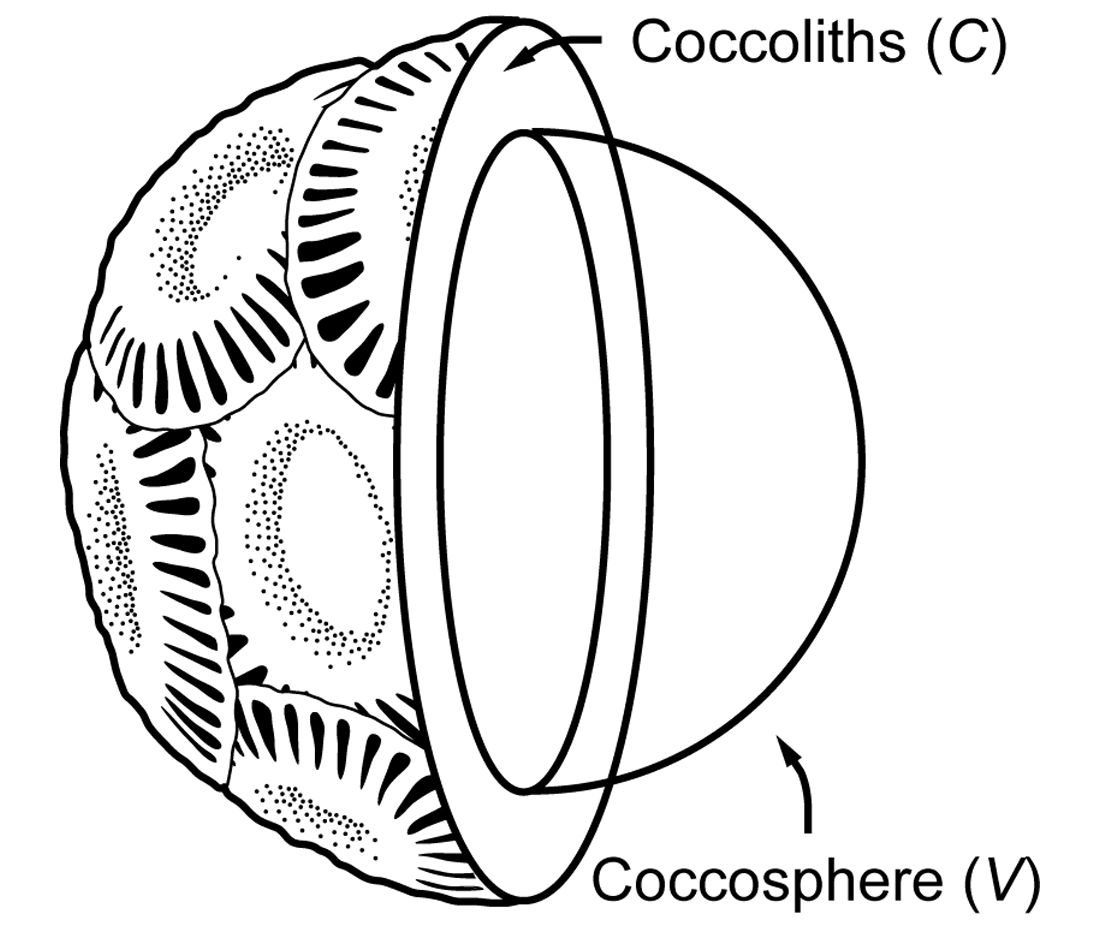
Partial cross section of a coccolithophore with coccolith layer

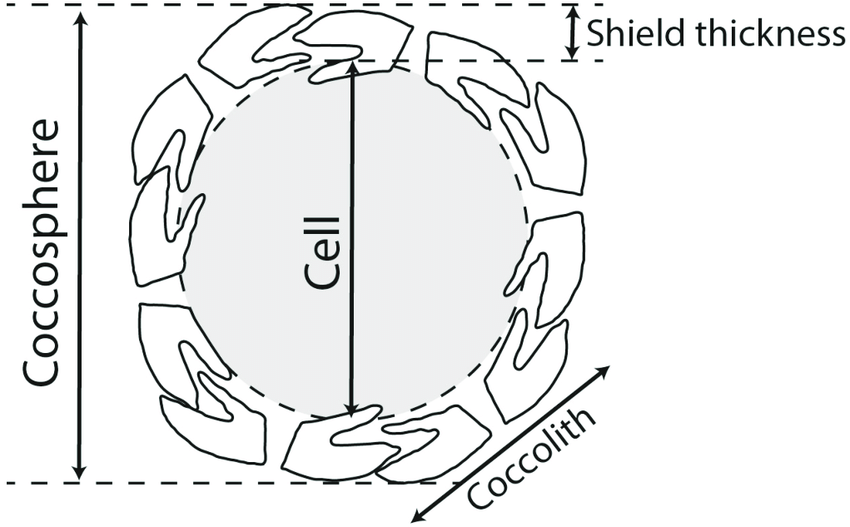
Coccolithophore cell surrounded by its shield of coccoliths. The coccolith-bearing cell is called the coccosphere.

Coccolithophores have been an integral part of marine plankton communities since the Jurassic. Today, coccolithophores contribute ~1–10% to primary production in the surface ocean and ~50% to pelagic CaCO_{3} sediments. Their calcareous shell increases the sinking velocity of photosynthetically fixed CO_{2} into the deep ocean by ballasting organic matter. At the same time, the biogenic precipitation of calcium carbonate during coccolith formation reduces the total alkalinity of seawater and releases CO_{2}. Thus, coccolithophores play an important role in the marine carbon cycle by influencing the efficiency of the biological carbon pump and the oceanic uptake of atmospheric CO_{2}.

As of 2021, it is not known why coccolithophores calcify and how their ability to produce coccoliths is associated with their ecological success. The most plausible benefit of having a coccosphere seems to be a protection against predators or viruses. Viral infection is an important cause of phytoplankton death in the oceans, and it has recently been shown that calcification can influence the interaction between a coccolithophore and its virus. The major predators of marine phytoplankton are microzooplankton like ciliates and dinoflagellates. These are estimated to consume about two-thirds of the primary production in the ocean and microzooplankton can exert a strong grazing pressure on coccolithophore populations. Although calcification does not prevent predation, it has been argued that the coccosphere reduces the grazing efficiency by making it more difficult for the predator to utilise the organic content of coccolithophores. Heterotrophic protists are able to selectively choose prey on the basis of its size or shape and through chemical signals and may thus favor other prey that is available and not protected by coccoliths.

== Formation and composition ==
Coccoliths are formed within the cell in vesicles derived from the golgi body. When the coccolith is complete these vesicles fuse with the cell wall and the coccolith is exocytosed and incorporated in the coccosphere. The coccoliths are either dispersed following death and breakup of the coccosphere, or are shed continually by some species. They sink through the water column to form an important part of the deep-sea sediments (depending on the water depth). Thomas Huxley was the first person to observe these forms in modern marine sediments and he gave them the name 'coccoliths' in a report published in 1858. Coccoliths are composed of calcium carbonate as the mineral calcite and are the main constituent of chalk deposits such as the white cliffs of Dover (deposited in Cretaceous times), in which they were first described by Henry Clifton Sorby in 1861.

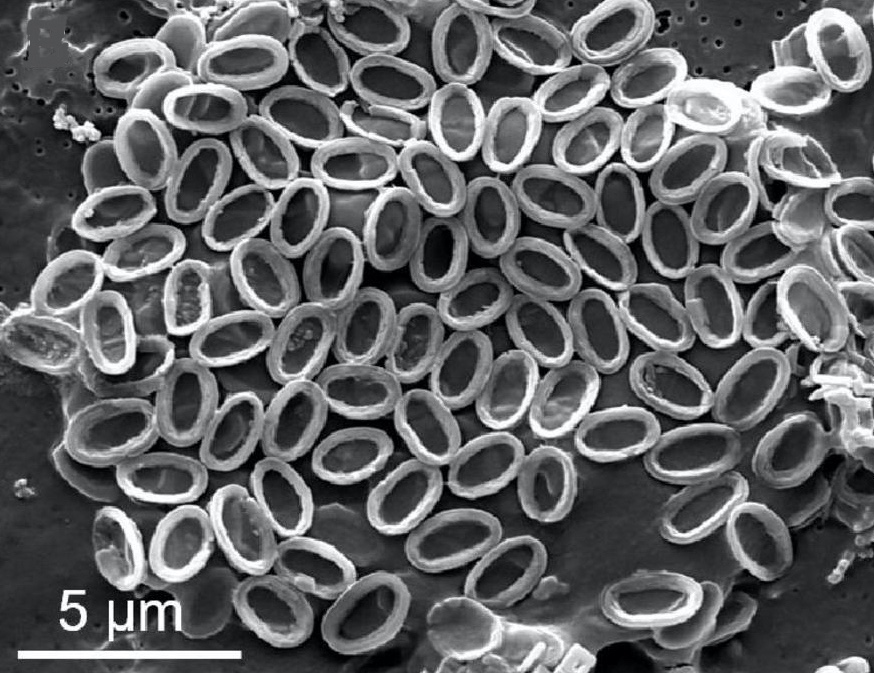
Collapsed coccosphere of Pleurochrysis carterae

== Types ==
There are two main types of coccoliths, heterococcoliths and holococcoliths. Heterococcoliths are formed of a radial array of elaborately shaped crystal units. Holococcoliths are formed of minute (~0.1 micrometre) calcite rhombohedra, arranged in continuous arrays. The two coccolith types were originally thought to be produced by different families of coccolithophores. Now, however, it is known through a mix of observations on field samples and laboratory cultures, that the two coccolith types are produced by the same species but at different life cycle phases. Heterococcoliths are produced in the diploid life-cycle phase and holococcoliths in the haploid phase. Both in field samples and laboratory cultures, there is the possibility of observing a cell covered by a combination of heterococcoliths and holococcoliths. This indicates the transition from the diploid to the haploid phase of the species. Such combination of coccoliths has been observed in field samples, with many of them coming from the Mediterranean.

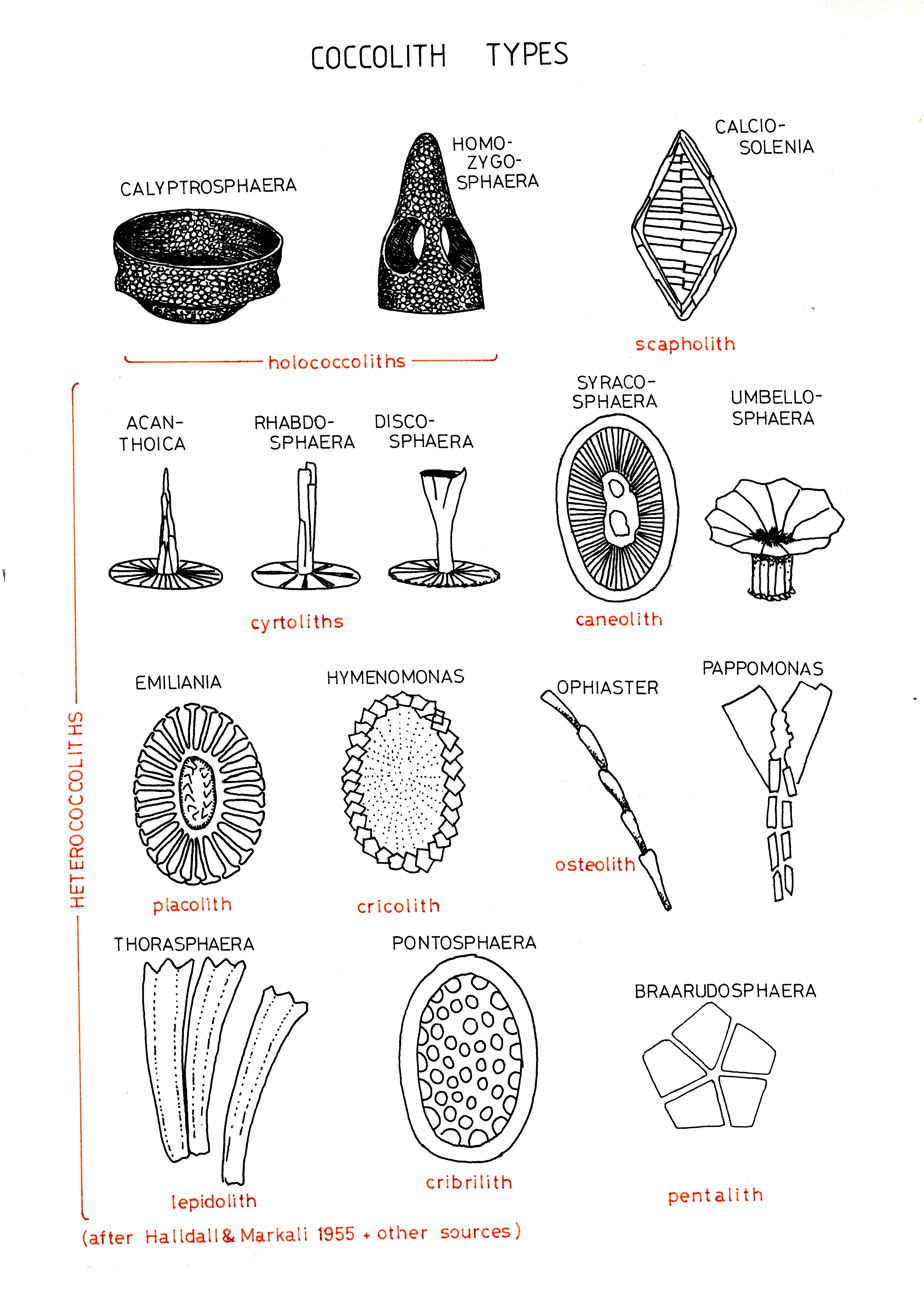
Types of coccoliths

=== Shape ===
Coccoliths are also classified depending on shape. Common shapes include:

- Calyptrolith – basket-shaped with openings near the base
- Caneolith – disc- or bowl-shaped
- Ceratolith – horseshoe or wishbone shaped
- Cribrilith – disc-shaped, with numerous perforations in the central area
- Cyrtolith – convex disc shaped, may with a projecting central process
- Discolith – ellipsoidal with a raised rim, in some cases the high rim forms a vase or cup-like structure
- Helicolith – a placolith with a spiral margin
- Lopadolith – basket or cup-shaped with a high rim, opening distally
- Pentalith – pentagonal shape composed of five four-sided crystals
- Placolith – rim composed of two plates stacked on top of one another
- Prismatolith – polygonal, may have perforations
- Rhabdolith – a single plate with a club-shaped central process
- Scapholith – rhombohedral, with parallel lines in center

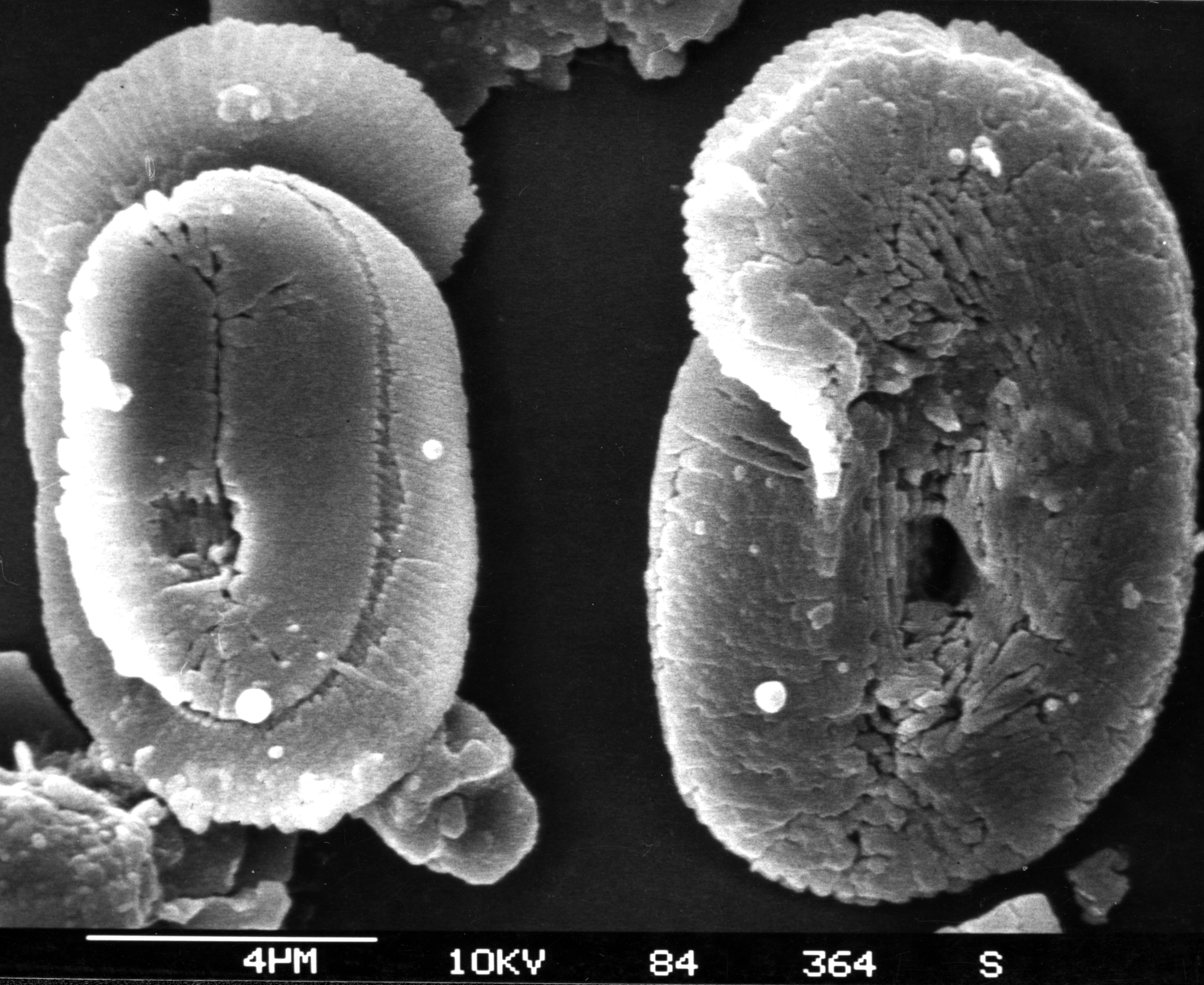
Helicoliths of Helicosphaera carteri

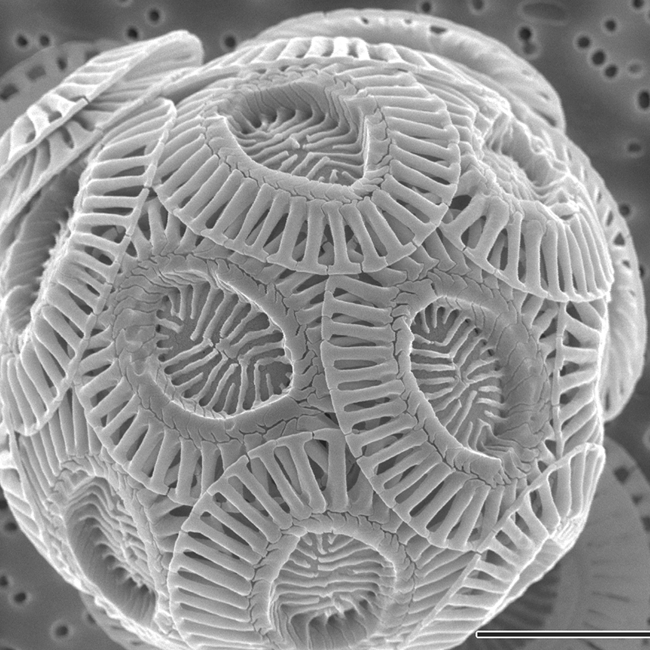
Coccosphere of Emiliania huxleyi consisting of overlapping placoliths

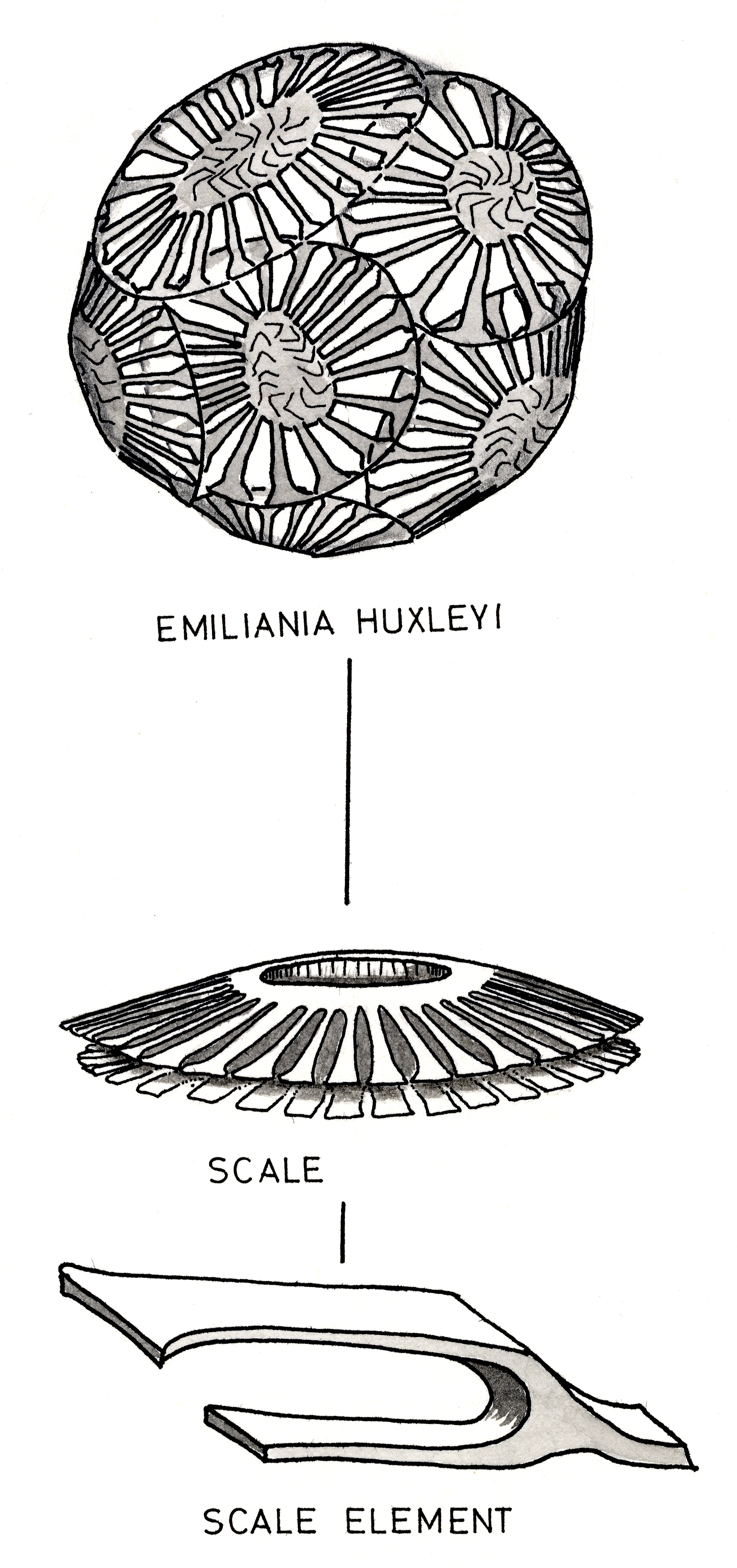
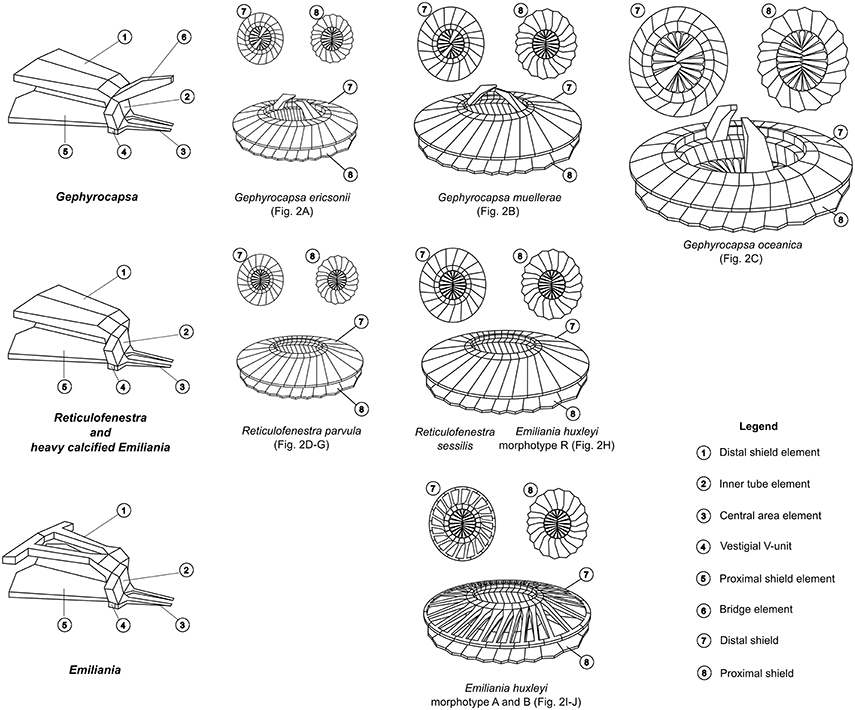
Coccolith structures of representative Noelaerhabdaceae.
Each morphospecies is associated with a SEM image in the next diagram
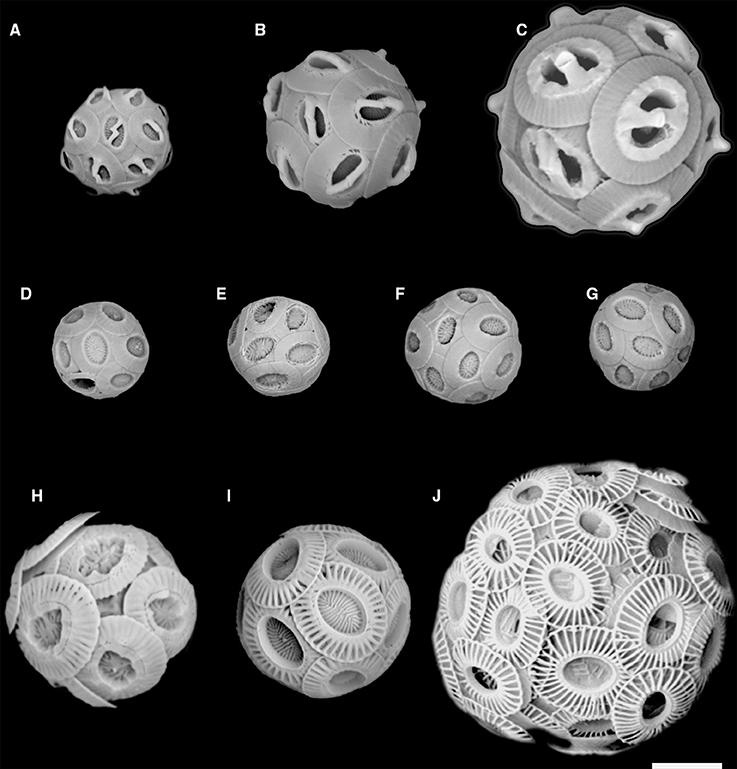
SEM images correspond to coccolith drawings in the previous diagram
(A) Gephyrocapsa ericsonii RCC4032 (B) Gephyrocapsa muellerae (C) Gephyrocapsa oceanica (D) Reticulofenestra parvular RCC4033; (E) Reticulofenestra parvular RCC4034; (F) Reticulofenestra parvular RCC4035; (G) Reticulofenestra parvular RCC4036; (H) Emiliania huxleyi morphotype R; (I) Emiliania huxleyi morphotype A; (J) Emiliania huxleyi morphotype B.

== Function ==
Although coccoliths are remarkably elaborate structures whose formation is a complex product of cellular processes, their function is unclear. Hypotheses include defence against grazing by zooplankton or infection by bacteria or viruses; maintenance of buoyancy; release of carbon dioxide for photosynthesis; to filter out harmful UV light; or in deep-dwelling species, to concentrate light for photosynthesis.

== Fossil record ==
Because coccoliths are formed of low-Mg calcite, the most stable form of calcium carbonate, they are readily fossilised. They are found in sediments together with similar microfossils of uncertain affinities (nanoliths) from the Upper Triassic to recent. They are widely used as biostratigraphic markers and as paleoclimatic proxies. Stable oxygen and carbon isotope data from coccoliths is used to reconstruct estimates of oceanic CO_{2} concentrations in the geologic past. Coccoliths and related fossils are referred to as calcareous nanofossils or calcareous nannoplankton (nanoplankton).
