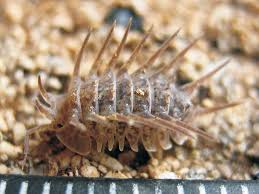
- Cuzcodinella alejandroi

Scientific classification
- Kingdom: Animalia
- Phylum: Arthropoda
- Class: Malacostraca
- Order: Isopoda
- Suborder: Oniscidea
- Family: Delatorreiidae
- Subfamily: Cuzcodinellinae
- Genus: Cuzcodinella de Armas & Juarrero de Varona, 1999

Species
- Cuzcodinella alejandroi de Armas & Rodriguez-Cabrera, 2016; Cuzcodinella oryx De Armas & Juarrero de Varona, 1999

= Cuzcodinella =

Genus of terrestrial isopod

Cuzcodinella is a genus of woodlouse found in Cuba. The small genus contains only two species. It is the sole member of the monotypic subfamily Cuzcodinellinae.
