= Cesare Emiliani =

Italian-born American scientist (1922–1995)

- Emiliani in the early 1950s
- Born: 8 December 1922; Bologna, Italy
- Died: 20 July 1995 (aged 72); Palm Beach Gardens, Florida, U.S.
- Citizenship: Italy and the United States
- Education: University of Bologna; University of Chicago
- Known for: Developing the timescale of marine isotope stages
- Spouse: Rosita (m. 1951)
- Children: 2
- Awards: Vega Medal (1983); Alexander Agassiz Medal (1989)
- Scientific career
- Fields: Geology; micropaleontology; paleoceanography
- Workplaces: Enrico Fermi Institute for Nuclear Studies, University of Chicago; University of Miami

Cesare Emiliani (8 December 1922 – 20 July 1995) was an Italian-American scientist, geologist, micropaleontologist, and founder of paleoceanography, developing the timescale of marine isotope stages, which, despite modifications, remains in use today.

He established that the ice ages of the last half million years or so are a cyclic phenomenon, which gave strong support to the hypothesis of Milankovitch and revolutionized ideas about the history of the oceans and of the glaciations. He was also the proponent of Project "LOCO" (for Long Cores) to the U.S. National Science Foundation. The project was a success, providing evidence of the history of the oceans and also serving to test the hypotheses of seafloor spreading and plate tectonics.

Cesare Emiliani was honored by having the genus Emiliania erected as home for the taxon huxleyi, which had previously been assigned to Coccolithus. He was further honored by receiving the Vega Medal of the Swedish Society for Anthropology and Geography (SSAG) (Swedish: Svenska Sällskapet för Antropologi och Geografi) in 1983, and the Alexander Agassiz Medal of the U.S. National Academy of Sciences in 1989 for his isotopic studies on Pleistocene and Holocene planktic foraminifera.

In his later years, he promoted a calendar reform based on the Holocene calendar (HE) concept to eliminate the BC–AD chronology gap caused by the lack of a year 0.

== Biography ==
Cesare Emiliani was born in Bologna, Italy. His parents were Luigi and Maria (Manfredini) Emiliani.

Emiliani studied geology at the University of Bologna in post-war Italy and earned his degree in Geology (micropaleontology) also at Bologna in 1945. After graduation, he worked as a micropaleontologist with the Società Idrocarburi Nazionali in Florence from 1946–48. In 1948, he was offered and accepted the Rollin D. Salisbury Fellowship in the Department of Geology at the University of Chicago, where he subsequently obtained his PhD in Geology (isotopic paleoclimatology) in 1950. From 1950 to 1956, he was a Research Associate in Harold Urey's Geochemistry Laboratory in the Enrico Fermi Institute for Nuclear Studies at the University of Chicago.

In 1957, Cesare Emiliani was working on Foraminifera (microscopic protists whose remains are greatly abundant in the fossil record) and was particularly interested in great climate changes known to have occurred during the Pleistocene Age. He was sure these tiny shells deposited in the ubiquitous ooze that coats the sea bottom held important clues. For that reason, he was looking at the time for a place to work where there were ships and trained personnel to help him obtain core samples of the deep-sea sediments for his studies. An interview with Dr. Walton Smith convinced Cesare that the University of Miami's Institute of Marine Science, which was renamed the Rosenstiel School of Marine, Atmospheric, and Earth Science, was the right place to conduct his research, and thus he moved there that same year. In 1967, he was named Chairman of the Division of Geology and Geophysics at the Institute. At that time, he organized the department of Geological Sciences on the main campus of the University of Miami and remained its Chairman until his retirement in 1993.

He died in Palm Beach Gardens, Florida in 1995. He was survived by his wife Rosita (d. 2010), son Mario, and daughter Sandra. Memorial tributes were written by colleagues.

== Works ==
=== Popular ===
- Emiliani, Cesare. (1992). Planet Earth : Cosmology, Geology, & the Evolution of Life & the Environment. Cambridge University Press. (Paperback Edition ISBN 0-521-40949-7)
- Emiliani, Cesare. (1995). The Scientific Companion : Exploring the Physical World with Facts, Figures, and Formulas (Wiley Popular Science) (2nd Edition). Wiley. (Paperback Edition ISBN 0-471-13324-8)
- Emiliani, Cesare. (1993). Dictionary of Physical Sciences. Oxford University Press. (Paperback Edition ISBN 0-19-503652-2)

=== Scientific ===
- Emiliani C (1954) Depth habitats of some species of pelagic foraminifera as indicated by oxygen isotope ratios. American Journal of Science 252:149–158
- Emiliani C (1954) Temperature of Pacific bottom waters and polar superficial waters during the Tertiary. Science 119:853–855
- Emiliani C (1956) Oligocene and Miocene temperature of the equatorial and subtropical Atlantic Ocean. Journal of Geology 64:281–288
- Emiliani C (1956) On paleotemperatures of Pacific bottom waters. Science 123:460–461
- Emiliani C (1957) Temperature and age analysis of deepsea cores. Science 125:383–385
- Emiliani C (1961) The temperature decrease of surface water in high latitudes and of abyssal-hadal water in open oceanic basins during the past 75 million years. Deep-Sea Research 8:144–147
- Emiliani C (1965) Precipitous continental clopes and considerations on the transitional crust. Science 147:145–148
- Emiliani C (1966) Isotopic paleotemperatures. Science 154: 851–857
- Emiliani C (1966). Paleotemperature analysis of Caribbean cores P6304-8 and P6304-9 and a generalized temperature curve for the past 425,000 years. Journal of Geology 74:109–124
- Emiliani C (1968) The Pleistocene epoch and the evolution of man. Current Anthropology 9:27–47
- Emiliani C (1969) Interglacials, high sea levels and the control of Greenland ice by the precession of the equinoxes. Science 166:1503–1504
- Emiliani C (1969) A new paleontology. Micropaleontology 15:265–300
- Emiliani C (1970) Pleistocene paleotemperatures. Science 168:822–825
- Emiliani C (1971) The amplitude of Pleistocene climatic cycles at low latitudes and the isotopic composition of glacial ice. In: Turekian KK (ed) Late Cenozoic Glacial Ages. New Haven, CT: Yale University Press, pp 183–197
- Emiliani C (1971) Depth habitats and growth stages of pelagic formanifera. Science 173:1122–1124
- Emiliani C (1971) Paleotemperature variations across the Plio-Pleistocene boundary at the type section. Science 171:600–602
- Emiliani C (1978) The cause of the ice ages. Earth and Planetary Science Letters 37:347–354
- Emiliani C (1981) A new global geology. In: Emiliani C (ed) The Oceanic Lithosphere. The Sea (8th edn). Vol. 7. New York: Wiley Interscience, pp 1687–738
- Emiliani C (1982) Extinctive evolution. Journal of Theoretical Biology 97:13–33
- Emiliani C (1987) Dictionary of Physical Sciences. Oxford: Oxford University Press
- Emiliani C (1988) The Scientific Companion. New York: Wiley
- Emiliani C (1989) The new geology or the old role of the geological sciences in science education. Journal of Geological Education 37:327–331
- Emiliani C (1991) Avogadro number and mole: a royal confusion. Journal of Geological Education 39:31–33
- Emiliani C (1991) Planktic et al. Marine Micropaleontology 18:3
- Emiliani C (1991) Planktic/planktonic, nektic/nektonic, benthic/benthonic. Journal of Paleontology 65:329
- Emiliani C, Ericson DB (1991) The glacial/interglacial temperature range of the surface water of the ocean at low latitudes. In: Taylor HP, O’Neil JR, Kaplan IR (eds) Special Publication: Stable Isotope Geochemistry: A Tribute to Samuel Epstein. Pennsylvania: Geochemical Society, University Park, pp 223–228
- Emiliani C (1992) The Moon as a piece of Mercury. Geologische Rundschau 81:791–794
- Emiliani C (1992) Planet Earth: Cosmology, Geology, and the Evolution of Life and Environment. New York: Cambridge University Press
- Emiliani C (1992) Pleistocene paleotemperatures. Science 257:1188–1189
- Emiliani C (1993) Milankovitch theory verified; discussion. Nature 364:583
- Emiliani C (1993) Calendar reform. Nature 366:716
- Emiliani C (1993) Extinction and viruses. BioSystems 31:155–159
- Emiliani C (1993) Paleoecological implications of Alaskan terrestrial vertebrate fauna in latest Cretaceous time at high paleolatitudes: Comment. Geology 21:1151–1152
- Emiliani C (1993) Viral extinctions in deep-sea species. Nature 366:217–218
- Emiliani C (1995) Redefinition of atomic mass unit, Avogadro constant, and mole. Geochimica et Cosmochimica Acta 59:1205–1206
- Emiliani C (1995) Tropical paleotemperatures: discussion. Science 268:1264
- Emiliani C, Edwards G (1953) Tertiary ocean bottom temperatures. Nature 171:887–888
- Emiliani C, Elliott I (1995) Vatican confusion. Nature 375:530
- Emiliani C, Epstein S (1953) Temperature variations in the lower Pleistocene of Southern California. Journal of Geology 61:171–181
- Emiliani C, Gartner S, Lidz B (1972) Neogene sedimentation on the Blake Plateau and the emergence of the Central American Isthmus. Palaeogeography, Palaeoclimatology, Palaeoecology 11:1–10
- Emiliani C, Gartner S, Lidz B, Eldridge K, Elvey DK, Huang PC, Stipp JJ, Swanson M (1975) Paleoclimatological analysis of late Quaternary cores from the northwestern Gulf of Mexico. Science 189:1083–1088
- Emiliani C, Geiss J (1959) On glaciations and their causes. Geologische Rundschau 46:576–601
- Emiliani C, Harrison CG, Swanson M (1969) Underground nuclear explosions and the control of earthquakes. Science 165:1255–1256
- Emiliani C, Kraus EB, Shoemaker EM (1981) Sudden death at the end of the Mesozoic. Earth and Planetary Science Letters 55:327–334
- Emiliani C, Mayeda T, Selli R (1961) Paleotemperature analysis of the Plio-Pleistocene section at Le Castella, Calabria, southern Italy. Geological Society of America Bulletin 72:679–688
- Emiliani C, Milliman JD (1966) Deep-sea sediments and their geological record. Earth-Science Reviews 1:105–132
- Emiliani C, Price DA, Seipp J (1991) Is the Postglacial artificial? In: Taylor HP, O’Neil JR, Kaplan IR (eds) Special Publication: Stable Isotope Geochemistry: A Tribute to Samuel Epstein. Pennsylvania: Geochemical Society, University Park, pp 229–231
- Emiliani C, Shackleton NJ (1974) The Brunhes Epoch: paleotemperature and geochronology. Science 183:511–514
