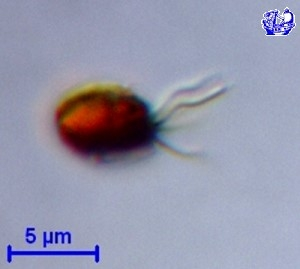
- Isochrysis galbana

Scientific classification
- Domain: Eukaryota
- Clade: Haptista
- Division: Haptophyta
- Class: Prymnesiophyceae
- Order: Isochrysidales
- Family: Isochrysidaceae; Bourrelly & Bourrelly

= Isochrysidaceae =

Family of single-celled organisms

Isochrysidaceae is a family of algae in the clade Haptophyta. It contains feedstock microalgae such as Isochrysis galbana.

== Genera ==
- Chrysidalis
- Chrysonema
- Chrysotila
- Dicrateria
- Isochrysis
- Pseudoisochrysis
- Ruttnera
- Scintilla
- Tisochrysis
