= Delatorreiidae =

Scientific classification
- Kingdom: Animalia
- Phylum: Arthropoda
- Clade: Pancrustacea
- Class: Malacostraca
- Order: Isopoda
- Suborder: Oniscidea
- Family: Delatorreiidae; Verhoeff, 1938

Genera
- Cuzcodinella Juarrero & de Armas, 1999; Pseudarmadillo Saussure, 1857

Family of woodlice

Delatorreiidae is a family of woodlice. It includes the genera Cuzcodinella and Pseudarmadillo.
