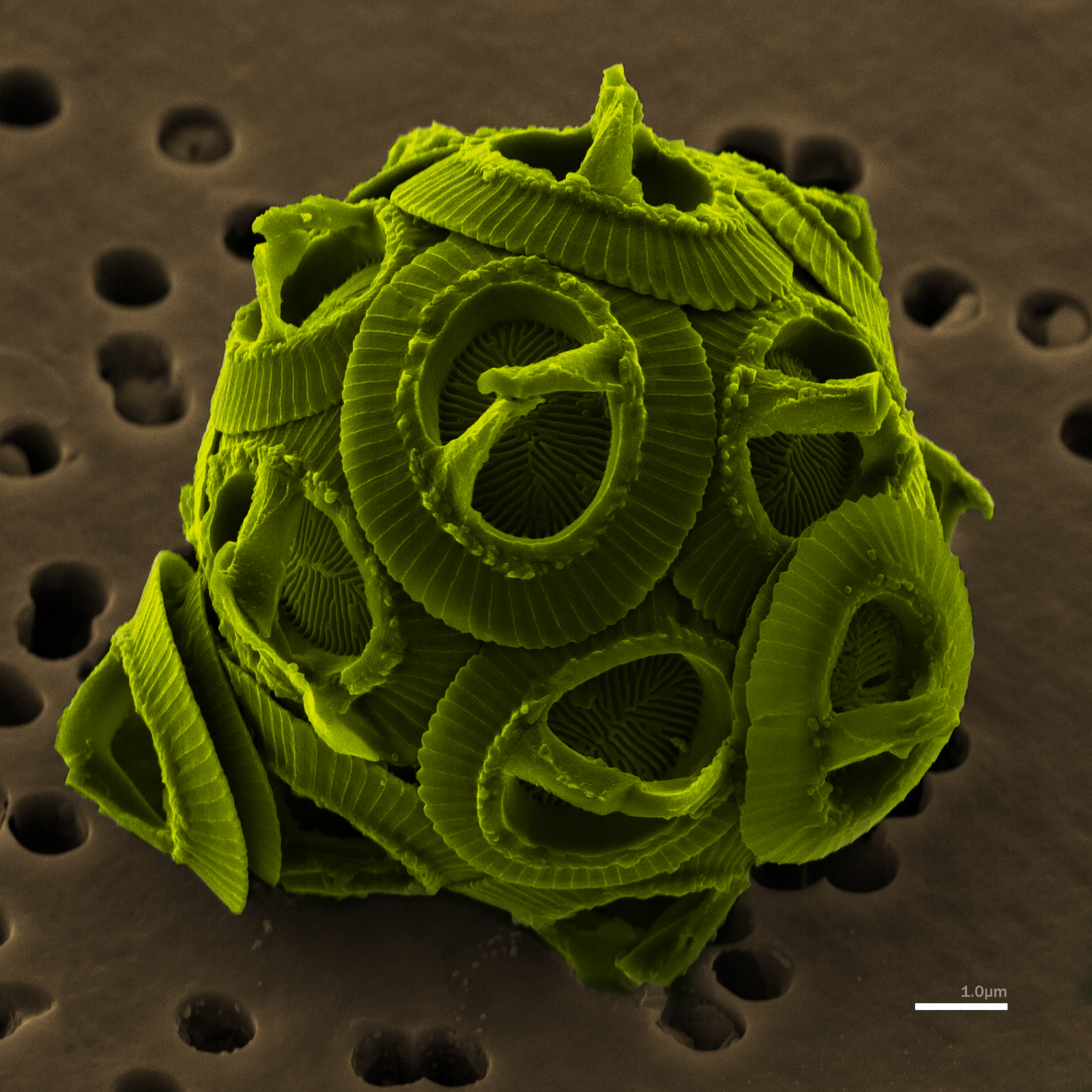
- Gephyrocapsa oceanica

Scientific classification
- Domain: Eukaryota
- Division: Haptophyta
- Class: Prymnesiophyceae
- Order: Isochrysidales
- Family: Noelaerhabdaceae; Jerković

= Noelaerhabdaceae =

Family of single-celled organisms

Noelaerhabdaceae is a family of coccolithophorids. Some genera include: Emiliania W.W.Hay & H.P.Mohler, Gephyrocapsa Kamptner, and Reticulofenestra W.W.Hay, Mohler & M.Wade.

Genera:

- Bekelithella
- Crenalithus
- Dictyococcites
- Emiliania
- Gephyrocapsa
- Noelaerhabdus
- Pseudoemiliania
- Pyrocyclus
- Reticulofenestra
