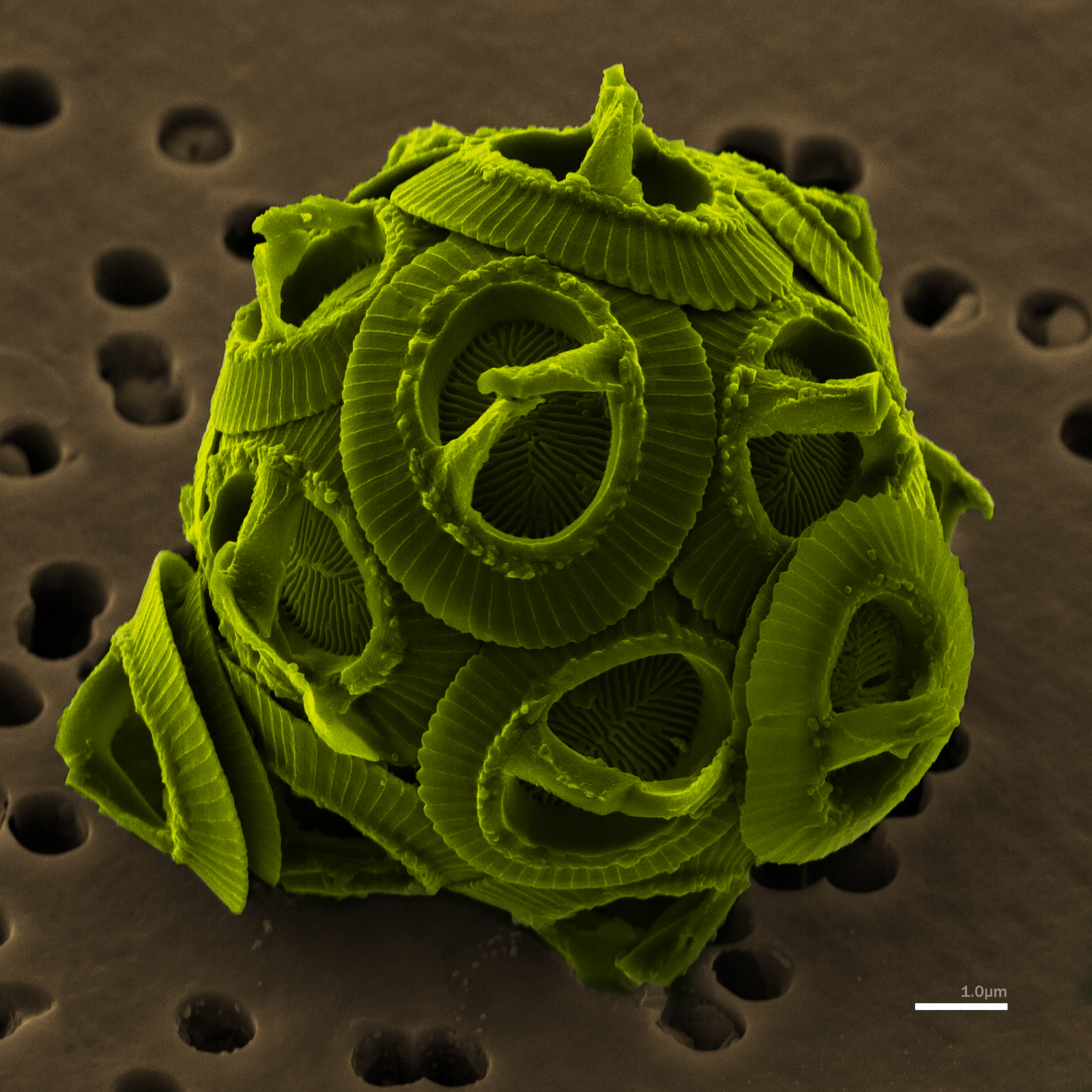
- Gephyrocapsa oceanica

Scientific classification
- Domain: Eukaryota
- Clade: Haptista
- Division: Haptophyta
- Class: Prymnesiophyceae
- Order: Isochrysidales; Pascher, 1910

Families
- Isochrysidaceae; Noelaerhabdaceae; Prinsiaceae

= Isochrysidales =

Order of single-celled organisms

Isochrysidales is an order of Haptophyceae.
