= Fenchel =

Fenchel is a surname. Notable people with the surname include:

- Heinz Fenchel (1906–1988), German art director
- Käte Fenchel (1905–1983), German mathematician
- Tom Fenchel (born 1940), Danish marine biologist
- Werner Fenchel (1905–1988), German mathematician

== See also ==
- Fenchel's Law, a regularity in population ecology
- Fennel
