= Biological pump =

Carbon capture process in oceans

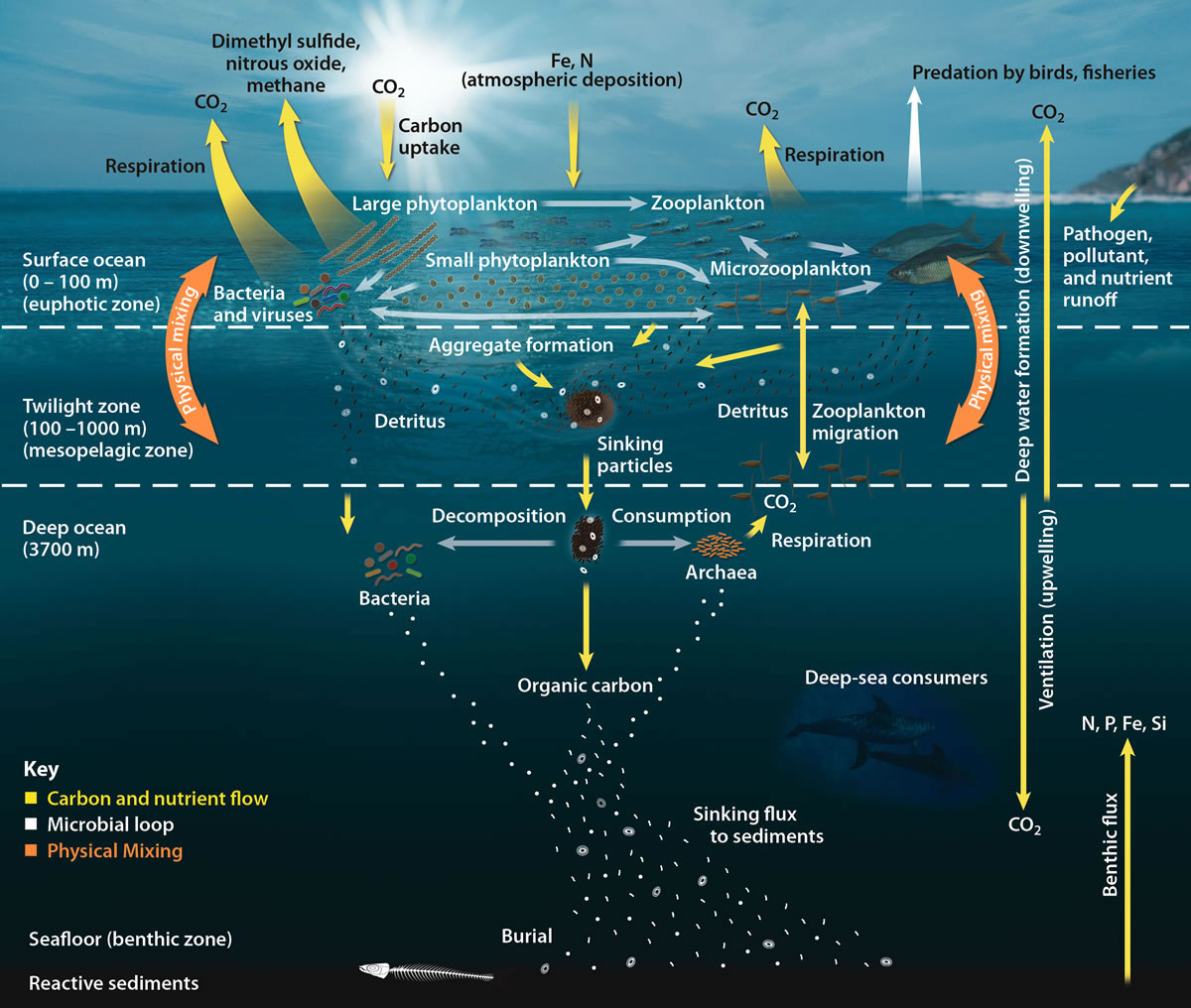
The pelagic food web, showing the central involvement of marine microorganisms in how the ocean imports carbon and then exports it back to the atmosphere and ocean floor

The biological pump (or marine biological carbon pump) is the ocean's biologically driven sequestration of carbon from the atmosphere and land runoff to the ocean interior and seafloor sediments. In other words, it is a biologically mediated process which results in the sequestering of carbon in the deep ocean away from the atmosphere and the land. The biological pump is the biological component of the "marine carbon pump" which contains both a physical and biological component. It is the part of the broader oceanic carbon cycle responsible for the cycling of organic matter formed mainly by phytoplankton during photosynthesis (soft-tissue pump), as well as the cycling of calcium carbonate (CaCO_{3}) formed into shells by certain organisms such as plankton and mollusks (carbonate pump).

Budget calculations of the biological carbon pump are based on the ratio between sedimentation (carbon export to the ocean floor) and remineralization (release of carbon to the atmosphere).

The biological pump is not so much the result of a single process, but rather the sum of a number of processes each of which can influence biological pumping. Overall, the pump transfers about 10.2 gigatonnes of carbon every year into the ocean's interior and a total of 1300 gigatonnes carbon over an average 127 years. This takes carbon out of contact with the atmosphere for several thousand years or longer. An ocean without a biological pump would result in atmospheric carbon dioxide levels about 400 ppm higher than the present day.

== Overview ==
The element carbon plays a central role in climate and life on Earth. It is capable of moving among and between the geosphere, cryosphere, atmosphere, biosphere and hydrosphere. This flow of carbon is referred to as the Earth's carbon cycle. It is also intimately linked to the cycling of other elements and compounds. The ocean plays a fundamental role in Earth's carbon cycle, helping to regulate atmospheric CO_{2} concentration. The biological pump is a set of processes that transfer organic carbon from the surface to the deep ocean, and is at the heart of the ocean carbon cycle.

The biological pump depends on the fraction of primary produced organic matter that survives degradation in the euphotic zone and that is exported from surface water to the ocean interior, where it is mineralized to inorganic carbon, with the result that carbon is transported against the gradient of dissolved inorganic carbon (DIC) from the surface to the deep ocean. This transfer occurs through physical mixing and transport of dissolved and particulate organic carbon (POC), vertical migrations of organisms (zooplankton, fish) and through gravitational settling of particulate organic carbon.

The biological pump can be divided into three distinct phases, the first of which is the production of fixed carbon by planktonic phototrophs in the euphotic (sunlit) surface region of the ocean. In these surface waters, phytoplankton use carbon dioxide (CO_{2}), nitrogen (N), phosphorus (P), and other trace elements (barium, iron, zinc, etc.) during photosynthesis to make carbohydrates, lipids, and proteins. Some plankton, (e.g. coccolithophores and foraminifera) combine calcium (Ca) and dissolved carbonates (carbonic acid and bicarbonate) to form a calcium carbonate (CaCO_{3}) protective coating.

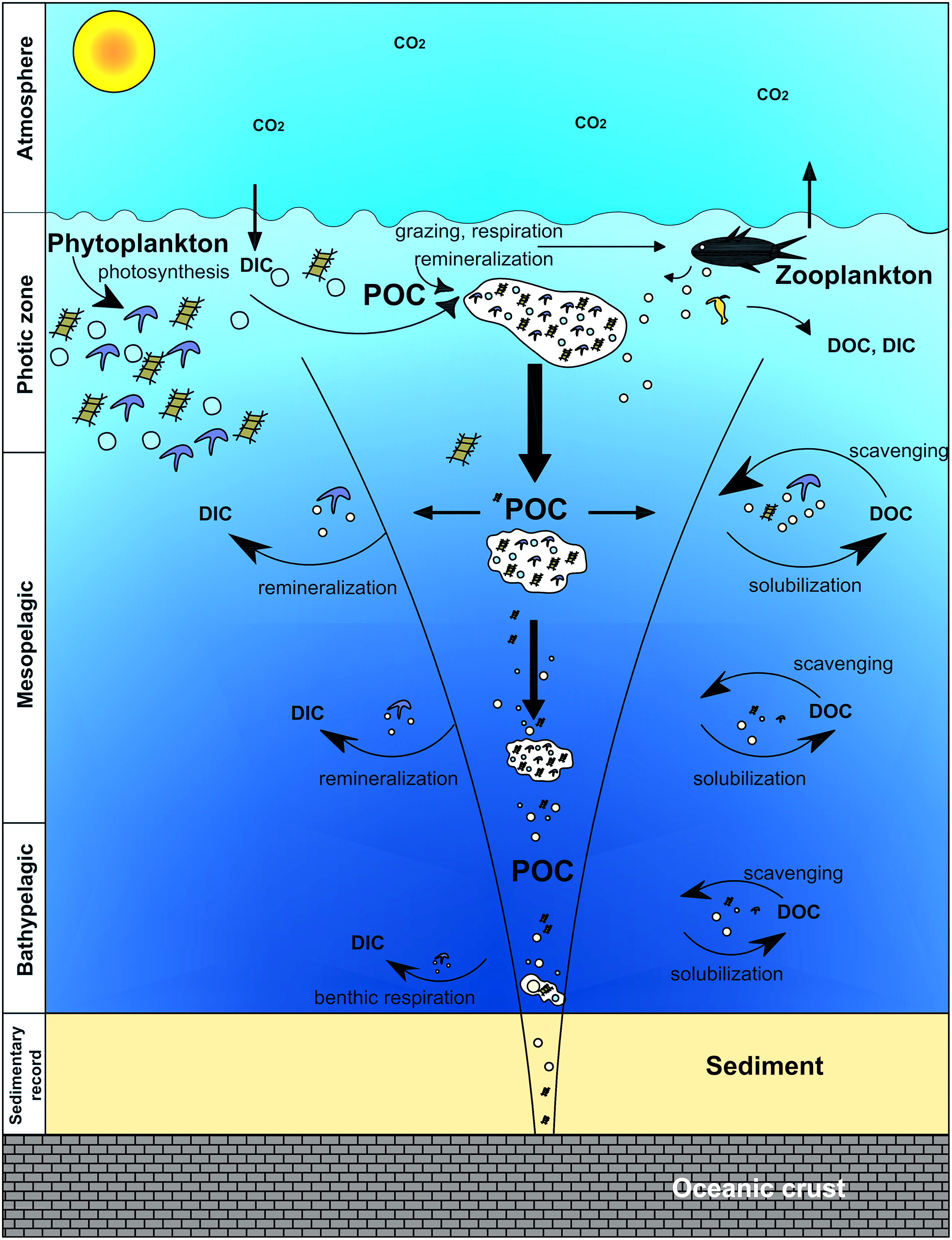
Pump processes vary with depth Photic zone: 0–100 m; Mesopelagic: 100–1000 m; Bathypelagic: 1000 to abyssal depths. Below 1000 m depth carbon is considered removed from the atmosphere for at least 100 years. Scavenging: DOC incorporation within sinking particles.

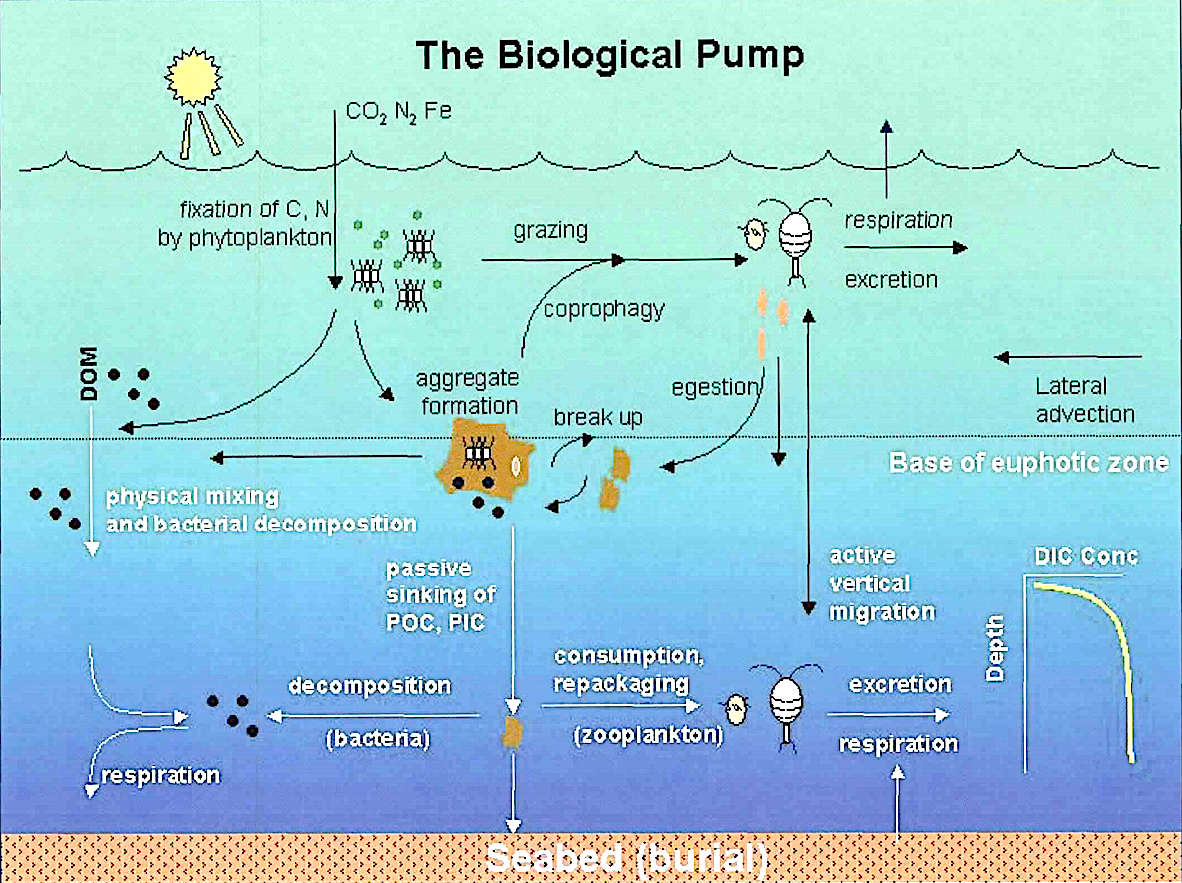
Components of the biological pump

Once this carbon is fixed into soft or hard tissue, the organisms either stay in the euphotic zone to be recycled as part of the regenerative nutrient cycle or once they die, continue to the second phase of the biological pump and begin to sink to the ocean floor. The sinking particles will often form aggregates as they sink, which greatly increases the sinking rate. It is this aggregation that gives particles a better chance of escaping predation and decomposition in the water column and eventually making it to the sea floor.

The fixed carbon that is decomposed by bacteria either on the way down or once on the sea floor then enters the final phase of the pump and is remineralized to be used again in primary production. The particles that escape these processes entirely are sequestered in the sediment and may remain there for millions of years. It is this sequestered carbon that is responsible for ultimately lowering atmospheric CO_{2}.

Biology, physics and gravity interact to pump organic carbon into the deep sea. The processes of fixation of inorganic carbon in organic matter during photosynthesis, its transformation by food web processes (trophodynamics), physical mixing, transport and gravitational settling are referred to collectively as the biological pump.

The biological pump is responsible for transforming dissolved inorganic carbon (DIC) into organic biomass and pumping it in particulate or dissolved form into the deep ocean. Inorganic nutrients and carbon dioxide are fixed during photosynthesis by phytoplankton, which both release dissolved organic matter (DOM) and are consumed by herbivorous zooplankton. Larger zooplankton - such as copepods - egest fecal pellets which can be reingested and sink or collect with other organic detritus into larger, more-rapidly-sinking aggregates. DOM is partially consumed by bacteria (black dots) and respired; the remaining refractory DOM is advected and mixed into the deep sea. DOM and aggregates exported into the deep water are consumed and respired, thus returning organic carbon into the enormous deep ocean reservoir of DIC. About 1% of the particles leaving the surface ocean reach the seabed and are consumed, respired, or buried in the sediments. There, carbon is stored for millions of years. The net effect of these processes is to remove carbon in organic form from the surface and return it to DIC at greater depths, maintaining the surface-to-deep ocean gradient of DIC. Thermohaline circulation returns deep-ocean DIC to the atmosphere on millennial timescales.

== Primary production ==
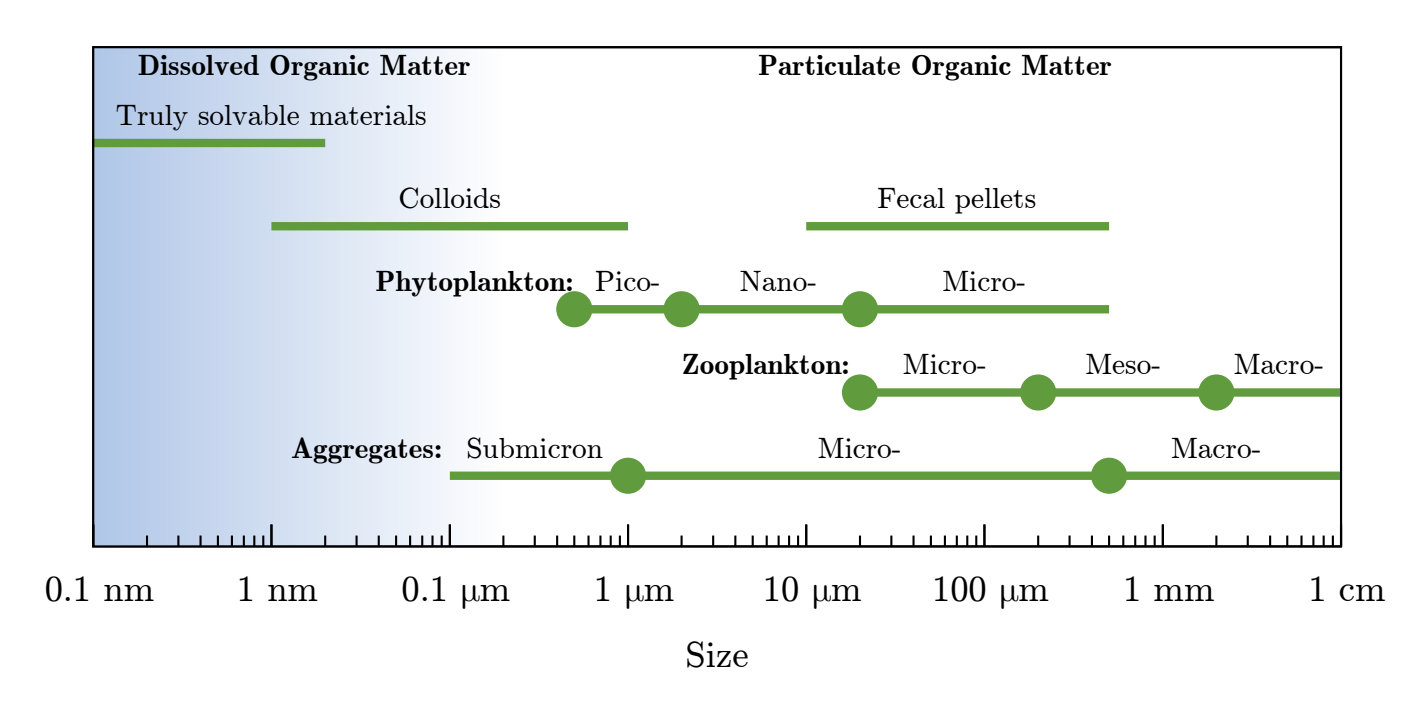
Size and classification of marine particles Adapted from Simon et al., 2002.

The first step in the biological pump is the synthesis of both organic and inorganic carbon compounds by phytoplankton in the uppermost, sunlit layers of the ocean. Organic compounds in the form of sugars, carbohydrates, lipids, and proteins are synthesized during the process of photosynthesis:

CO_{2} + H_{2}O + light → CH_{2}O + O_{2}

In addition to carbon, organic matter found in phytoplankton is composed of nitrogen, phosphorus and various trace metals. The ratio of carbon to nitrogen and phosphorus varies from place to place, but has an average ratio near 106C:16N:1P, known as the Redfield ratio. Trace metals such as magnesium, cadmium, iron, calcium, barium and copper are orders of magnitude less prevalent in phytoplankton organic material, but necessary for certain metabolic processes and therefore can be limiting nutrients in photosynthesis due to their lower abundance in the water column.

Oceanic primary production accounts for about half of the carbon fixation carried out on Earth. Approximately 50–60 Pg of carbon are fixed by marine phytoplankton each year despite the fact that they account for less than 1% of the total photosynthetic biomass on Earth. The majority of this carbon fixation (~80%) is carried out in the open ocean while the remaining amount occurs in the very productive upwelling regions of the ocean. Despite these productive regions producing 2 to 3 times as much fixed carbon per area, the open ocean accounts for greater than 90% of the ocean area and therefore is the larger contributor.

== Forms of carbon ==
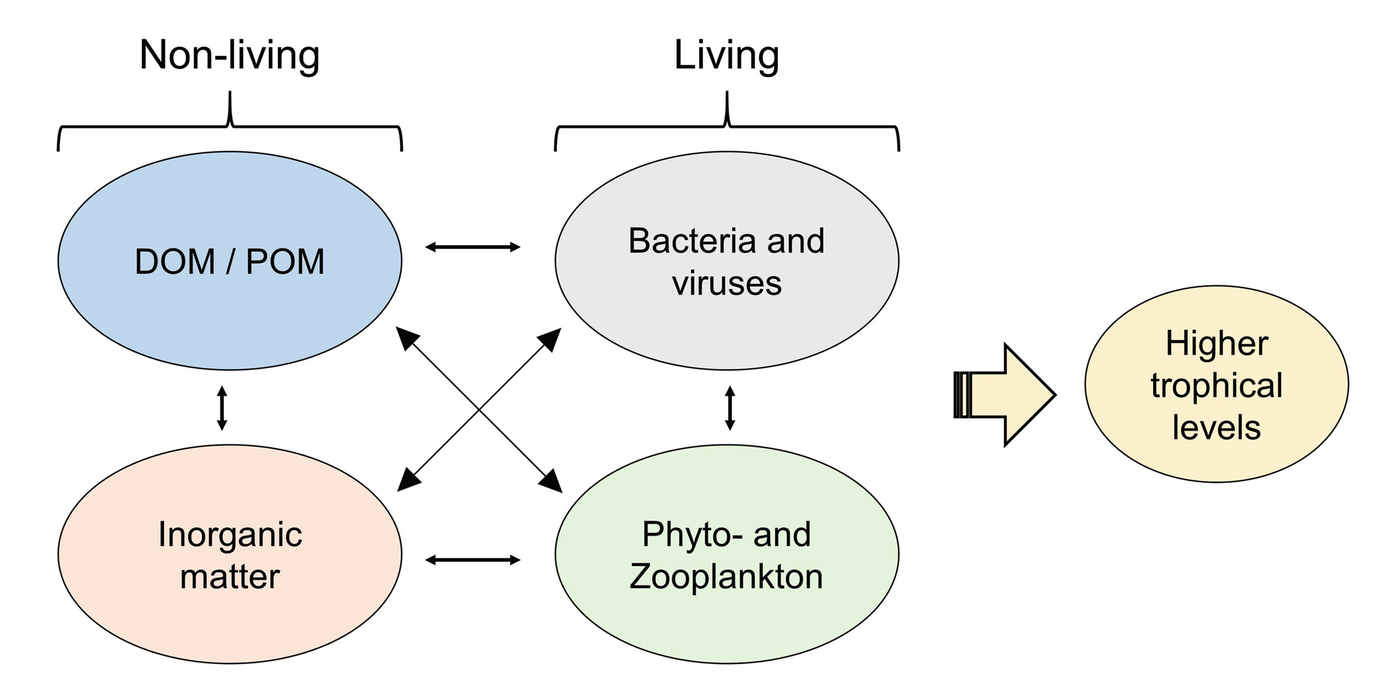
DOM and POM Connections between the different compartments of the living (bacteria/viruses and phyto−/zooplankton) and the nonliving (DOM/POM and inorganic matter) environment

=== Dissolved and particulate carbon ===
Phytoplankton supports all life in the ocean as it converts inorganic compounds into organic constituents. This autotrophically produced biomass presents the foundation of the marine food web. In the diagram immediately below, the arrows indicate the various production (arrowhead pointing toward DOM pool) and removal processes of DOM (arrowhead pointing away), while the dashed arrows represent dominant biological processes involved in the transfer of DOM. Due to these processes, the fraction of labile DOM decreases rapidly with depth, whereas the refractory character of the DOM pool considerably increases during its export to the deep ocean. DOM, dissolved organic matter.

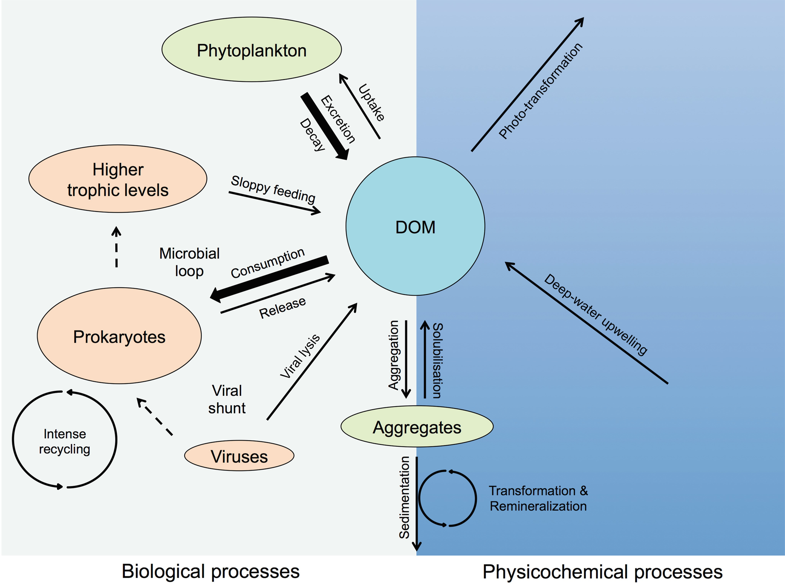
The fate of DOM in the ocean

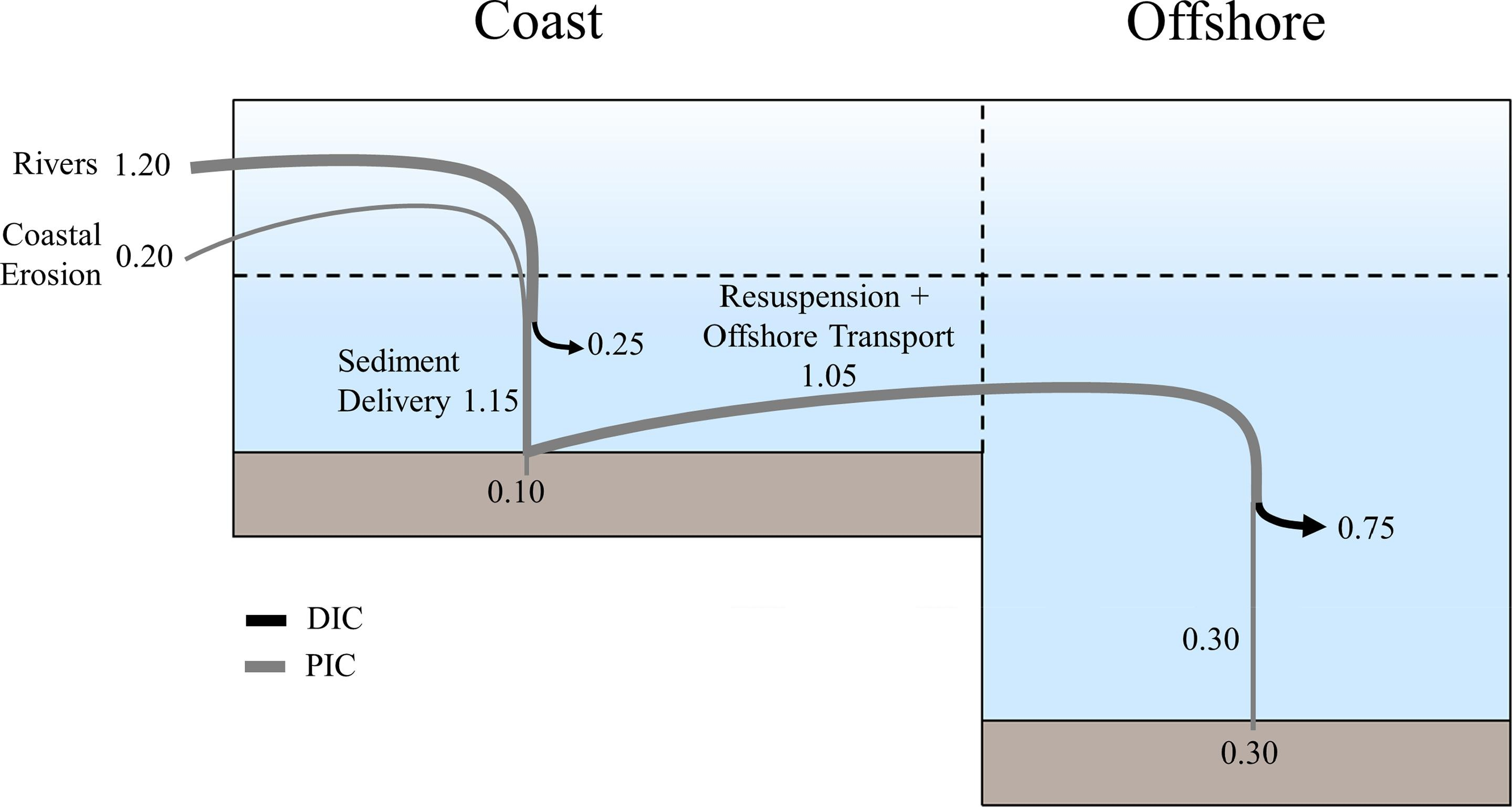
Particulate inorganic carbon budget for Hudson Bay Black arrows represent DIC produced by PIC dissolution. Grey lines represent terrestrial PIC. Units are Tg C y^{−1}

=== Ocean carbon pools ===
The marine biological pump depends on a number of key pools, components and processes that influence its functioning. There are four main pools of carbon in the ocean.

- Dissolved inorganic carbon (DIC) is the largest pool. It constitutes around 38,000 Pg C and includes dissolved carbon dioxide (CO_{2}), bicarbonate (HCO^{−}_{3}), carbonate (CO^{2−}_{3}), and carbonic acid (H_{2}CO_{3}). The equilibrium between carbonic acid and carbonate determines the pH of the seawater. Carbon dioxide dissolves easily in water and its solubility is inversely related to temperature. Dissolved CO_{2} is taken up in the process of photosynthesis, and can reduce the partial pressure of CO_{2} in the seawater, favouring drawdown from the atmosphere. The reverse process respiration, releases CO_{2} back into the water, can increase partial pressure of CO_{2} in the seawater, favouring release back to the atmosphere. The formation of calcium carbonate by organisms such as coccolithophores has the effect of releasing CO_{2} into the water.
- Dissolved organic carbon (DOC) is the next largest pool at around 662 Pg C. DOC can be classified according to its reactivity as refractory, semi-labile or labile. The labile pool constitutes around 0.2 Pg C, is bioavailable, and has a high production rate (~ 15−25 Pg C y^{−1}). The refractory component is the biggest pool (~642 Pg C ± 32; but has a very low turnover rate (0.043 Pg C y^{−1}). The turnover time for refractory DOC is thought to be greater than 1000 years.
- Particulate organic carbon (POC) constitutes around 2.3 Pg C, and is relatively small compared with DIC and DOC. Though small in size, this pool is highly dynamic, having the highest turnover rate of any organic carbon pool on the planet. Driven by primary production, it produces around 50 Pg C y^{−1} globally. It can be separated into living (e.g. phytoplankton, zooplankton, bacteria) and non-living (e.g. detritus) material. Of these, the phytoplankton carbon is particularly important, because of its role in marine primary production, and also because it serves as the food resource for all the larger organisms in the pelagic ecosystem.
- Particulate inorganic carbon (PIC) is the smallest of the pools at around 0.03 Pg C. It is present in the form of calcium carbonate (CaCO_{3}) in particulate form, and impacts the carbonate system and pH of the seawater. Estimates for PIC production are in the region of 0.8–1.4 Pg C y^{−1}, with at least 65% of it being dissolved in the upper water column, the rest contributing to deep sediments. Coccolithophores and foraminifera are estimated to be the dominant sources of PIC in the open ocean. The PIC pool is of particular importance due to its role in the ocean carbonate system, and in facilitating the export of carbon to the deep ocean through the carbonate pump, whereby PIC is exported out of the photic zone and deposited in the bottom sediments.

=== Calcium carbonate ===
Coccolithophores

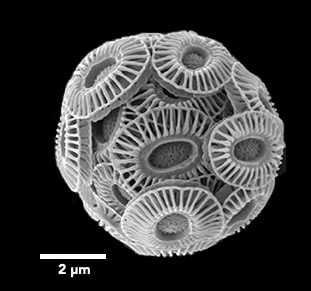
The coccolithophore Emiliania huxleyi (µm = thousandth of one mm)

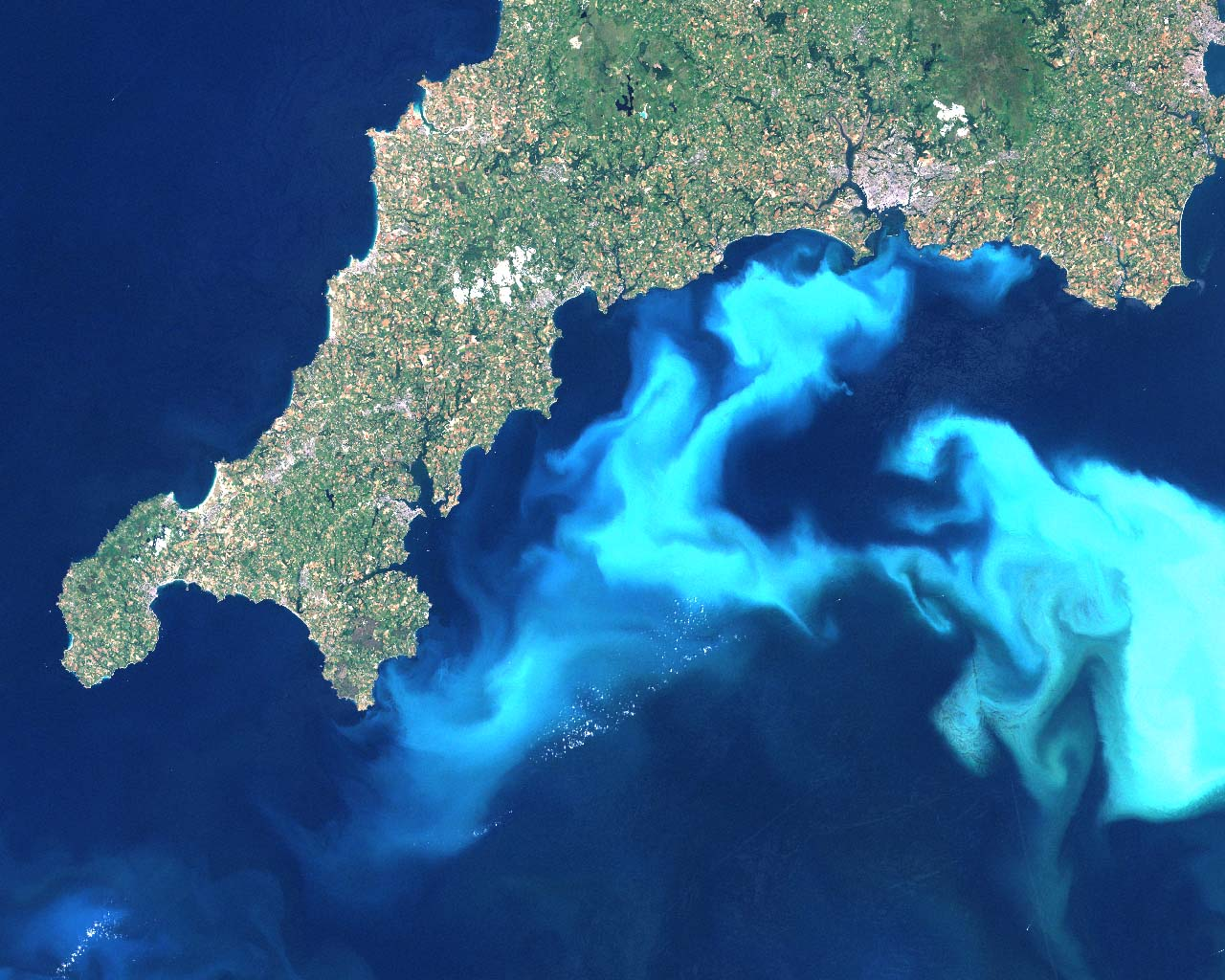
Algae bloom of Emiliania huxleyi off the southern coast of England

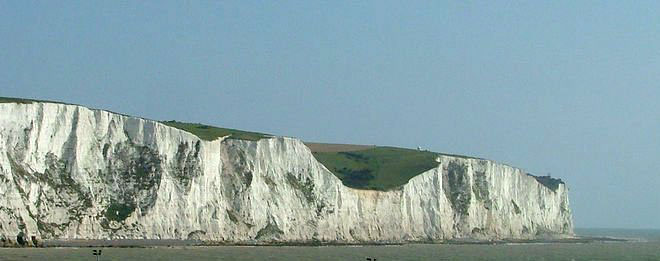
The White Cliffs of Dover are made almost entirely of the plates of buried coccolithophores ( see below ↓ )

Particulate inorganic carbon (PIC) usually takes the form of calcium carbonate (CaCO_{3}), and plays a key part in the ocean carbon cycle. This biologically fixed carbon is used as a protective coating for many planktonic species (coccolithophores, foraminifera) as well as larger marine organisms (mollusk shells). Calcium carbonate is also excreted at high rates during osmoregulation by fish, and can form in whiting events. While this form of carbon is not directly taken from the atmospheric budget, it is formed from dissolved forms of carbonate which are in equilibrium with CO_{2} and then responsible for removing this carbon via sequestration.

CO_{2} + H_{2}O → H_{2}CO_{3} → H^{+} + HCO_{3}^{−}

Ca^{2+} + 2HCO_{3}^{−} → CaCO_{3} + CO_{2} + H_{2}O

While this process does manage to fix a large amount of carbon, two units of alkalinity are sequestered for every unit of sequestered carbon. The formation and sinking of CaCO_{3} therefore drives a surface to deep alkalinity gradient which serves to raise the pH of surface waters, shifting the speciation of dissolved carbon to raise the partial pressure of dissolved CO_{2} in surface waters, which actually raises atmospheric levels. In addition, the burial of CaCO_{3} in sediments serves to lower overall oceanic alkalinity, tending to raise pH and thereby atmospheric CO_{2} levels if not counterbalanced by the new input of alkalinity from weathering. The portion of carbon that is permanently buried at the sea floor becomes part of the geologic record. Calcium carbonate often forms remarkable deposits that can then be raised onto land through tectonic motion as in the case with the White Cliffs of Dover in Southern England. These cliffs are made almost entirely of the plates of buried coccolithophores.

== Oceanic carbon cycle ==
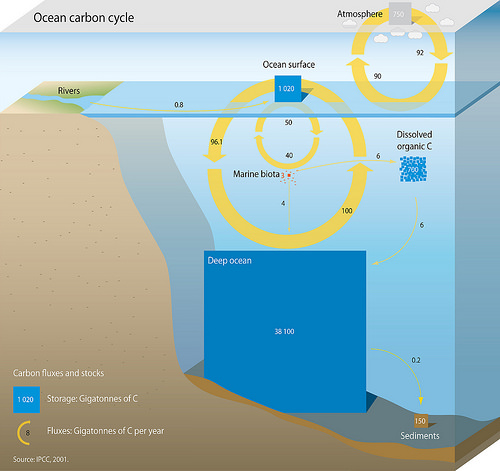
Oceanic Carbon Cycle — IPCC

Three main processes (or pumps) that make up the marine carbon cycle bring atmospheric carbon dioxide (CO_{2}) into the ocean interior and distribute it through the oceans. These three pumps are: (1) the solubility pump, (2) the carbonate pump, and (3) the biological pump. The total active pool of carbon at the Earth's surface for durations of less than 10,000 years is roughly 40,000 gigatons C (Gt C, a gigaton is one billion tons, or the weight of approximately 6 million blue whales), and about 95% (~38,000 Gt C) is stored in the ocean, mostly as dissolved inorganic carbon. The speciation of dissolved inorganic carbon in the marine carbon cycle is a primary controller of acid-base chemistry in the oceans.

=== Solubility pump ===
Solubility pump: Air-sea exchange of CO_{2}

The biological pump is accompanied by a physico-chemical counterpart known as the solubility pump. This pump transports significant amounts of carbon in the form of dissolved inorganic carbon (DIC) from the ocean's surface to its interior. It involves physical and chemical processes only, and does not involve biological processes.

The solubility pump is driven by the coincidence of two processes in the ocean:

- The solubility of carbon dioxide is a strong inverse function of seawater temperature (i.e. solubility is greater in cooler water)
- The thermohaline circulation is driven by the formation of deep water at high latitudes where seawater is usually cooler and denser

Since deep water (that is, seawater in the ocean's interior) is formed under the same surface conditions that promote carbon dioxide solubility, it contains a higher concentration of dissolved inorganic carbon than might be expected from average surface concentrations. Consequently, these two processes act together to pump carbon from the atmosphere into the ocean's interior. One consequence of this is that when deep water upwells in warmer, equatorial latitudes, it strongly outgasses carbon dioxide to the atmosphere because of the reduced solubility of the gas.

=== Carbonate pump ===
The carbonate pump is sometimes referred to as the "hard tissue" component of the biological pump. Some surface marine organisms, like coccolithophores, produce hard structures out of calcium carbonate, a form of particulate inorganic carbon, by fixing bicarbonate. This fixation of DIC is an important part of the oceanic carbon cycle.

Ca^{2+} + 2 HCO_{3}^{−} → CaCO_{3} + CO_{2} + H_{2}O

While the biological carbon pump fixes inorganic carbon (CO_{2}) into particulate organic carbon in the form of sugar (C_{6}H_{12}O_{6}), the carbonate pump fixes inorganic bicarbonate and causes a net release of CO_{2}. In this way, the carbonate pump could be termed the carbonate counter pump. It works counter to the biological pump by counteracting the CO_{2} flux into the biological pump.

=== Continental shelf pump ===
The continental shelf pump is proposed as operating in the shallow waters of the continental shelves as a mechanism transporting carbon (dissolved or particulate) from the continental waters to the interior of the adjacent deep ocean. As originally formulated, the pump is thought to occur where the solubility pump interacts with cooler, and therefore denser water from the shelf floor which feeds down the continental slope into the neighbouring deep ocean. The shallowness of the continental shelf restricts the convection of cooling water, so the cooling can be greater for continental shelf waters than for neighbouring open ocean waters. These cooler waters promote the solubility pump and lead to an increased storage of dissolved inorganic carbon. This extra carbon storage is further augmented by the increased biological production characteristic of shelves. The dense, carbon-rich shelf waters then sink to the shelf floor and enter the sub-surface layer of the open ocean via isopycnal mixing. As the sea level rises in response to global warming, the surface area of the shelf seas will grow and in consequence the strength of the shelf sea pump should increase.

== Processes in the biological pump ==
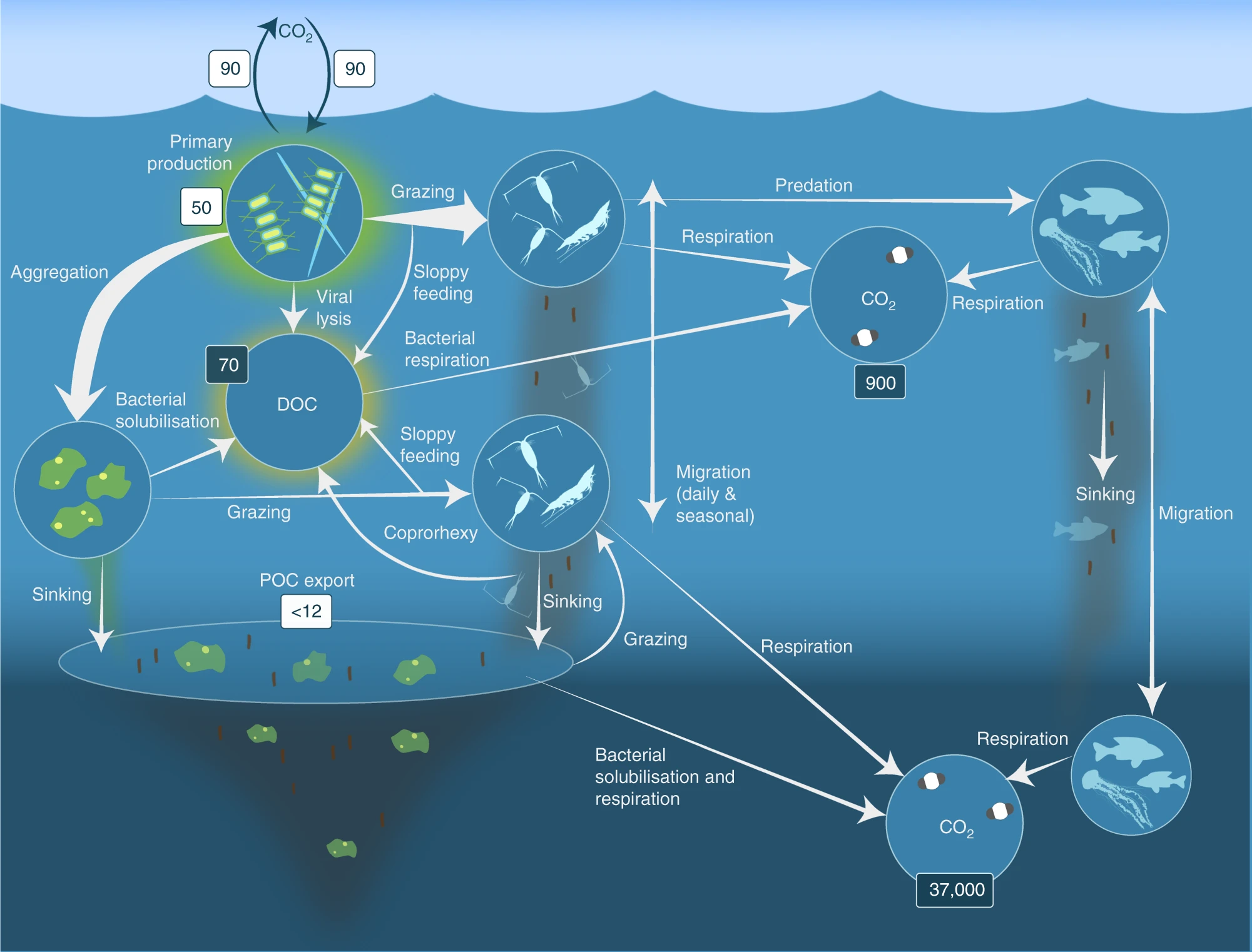
Processes in the biological pump Carbon fluxes in white boxes are in Gt C yr^{−1} and carbon masses in dark boxes are in Gt C

In the diagram on the right, phytoplankton convert CO_{2}, which has dissolved from the atmosphere into the surface oceans (90 Gt yr^{−1}), into particulate organic carbon (POC) during primary production (~ 50 Gt C yr^{−1}). Phytoplankton are then consumed by copepods, krill and other small zooplankton grazers, which in turn are preyed upon by higher trophic levels. Any unconsumed phytoplankton form aggregates, and along with zooplankton faecal pellets, sink rapidly and are exported out of the mixed layer (< 12 Gt C yr^{−1} 14). Krill, copepods, zooplankton and microbes intercept phytoplankton in the surface ocean and sinking detrital particles at depth, consuming and respiring this POC to CO_{2} (dissolved inorganic carbon, DIC), such that only a small proportion of surface-produced carbon sinks to the deep ocean (i.e., depths > 1000 m). As krill and smaller zooplankton feed, they also physically fragment particles into small, slower- or non-sinking pieces (via sloppy feeding, coprorhexy if fragmenting faeces), retarding POC export. This releases dissolved organic carbon (DOC) either directly from cells or indirectly via bacterial solubilisation (yellow circle around DOC). Bacteria can then remineralise the DOC to DIC (CO_{2}, microbial gardening).

The biological carbon pump is one of the chief determinants of the vertical distribution of carbon in the oceans and therefore of the surface partial pressure of CO_{2} governing air-sea CO_{2} exchange. It comprises phytoplankton cells, their consumers and the bacteria that assimilate their waste and plays a central role in the global carbon cycle by delivering carbon from the atmosphere to the deep sea, where it is concentrated and sequestered for centuries. Photosynthesis by phytoplankton lowers the partial pressure of CO_{2} in the upper ocean, thereby facilitating the absorption of CO_{2} from the atmosphere by generating a steeper CO_{2} gradient. It also results in the formation of particulate organic carbon (POC) in the euphotic layer of the epipelagic zone (0–200 m depth). The POC is processed by microbes, zooplankton and their consumers into fecal pellets, organic aggregates ("marine snow") and other forms, which are thereafter exported to the mesopelagic (200–1000 m depth) and bathypelagic zones by sinking and vertical migration by zooplankton and fish. Although primary production includes both dissolved and particulate organic carbon (DOC and POC respectively), only POC leads to efficient carbon export to the ocean interior, whereas the DOC fraction in surface waters is mostly recycled by bacteria. However, a more biologically resistant DOC fraction produced in the euphotic zone (accounting for 15–20% of net community productivity), is not immediately mineralized by microbes and accumulates in the ocean surface as biologically semi-labile DOC. This semi-labile DOC undergoes net export to the deep ocean, thus constituting a dynamic part of the biological carbon pump. The efficiency of DOC production and export varies across oceanographic regions, being more prominent in the oligotrophic subtropical oceans. The overall efficiency of the biological carbon pump is mostly controlled by the export of POC.

=== Marine snow ===
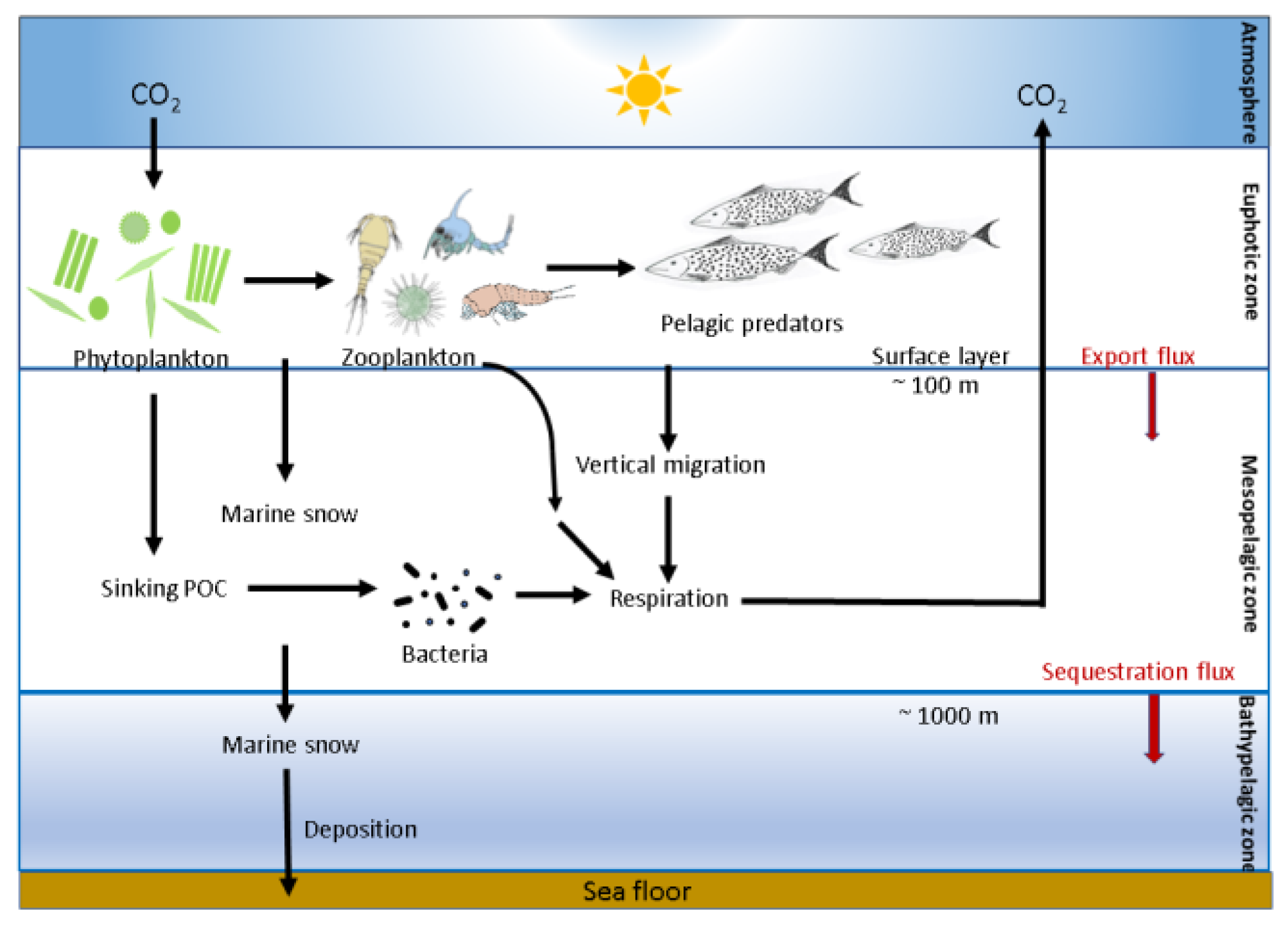
Marine snow, phytoplankton and the biological pump Budget calculations of the biological carbon pump are based on the ratio between sedimentation (carbon export) and remineralization (release to the atmosphere).

Most carbon incorporated in organic and inorganic biological matter is formed at the sea surface where it can then start sinking to the ocean floor. The deep ocean gets most of its nutrients from the higher water column when they sink down in the form of marine snow. This is made up of dead or dying animals and microbes, fecal matter, sand and other inorganic material. A single phytoplankton cell has a sinking rate around one metre per day. Given that the average depth of the ocean is about four kilometres, it can take over ten years for these cells to reach the ocean floor. However, through processes such as coagulation and expulsion in predator fecal pellets, these cells form aggregates. These aggregates, known as marine snow, have sinking rates orders of magnitude greater than individual cells and complete their journey to the deep in a matter of days.

In the diagram on the right, phytoplankton fix CO_{2} in the euphotic zone using solar energy and produce particulate organic carbon (POC). POC formed in the euphotic zone is processed by microbes, zooplankton and their consumers into organic aggregates (marine snow), which is thereafter exported to the mesopelagic (200–1000 m depth) and bathypelagic zones by sinking and vertical migration by zooplankton and fish. Export flux is defined as the sedimentation out of the surface layer (at approximately 100 m depth) and sequestration flux is the sedimentation out of the mesopelagic zone (at approximately 1000 m depth). A portion of the POC is respired back to CO_{2} in the oceanic water column at depth, mostly by heterotrophic microbes and zooplankton, thus maintaining a vertical gradient in concentration of dissolved inorganic carbon (DIC). This deep-ocean DIC returns to the atmosphere on millennial timescales through thermohaline circulation. Between 1% and 40% of the primary production is exported out of the euphotic zone, which attenuates exponentially towards the base of the mesopelagic zone and only about 1% of the surface production reaches the sea floor.

Of the 50–60 Pg of carbon fixed annually, roughly 10% leaves the surface mixed layer of the oceans, while less than 0.5% of eventually reaches the sea floor. Most is retained in regenerated production in the euphotic zone and a significant portion is remineralized in midwater processes during particle sinking. The portion of carbon that leaves the surface mixed layer of the ocean is sometimes considered "sequestered", and essentially removed from contact with the atmosphere for many centuries. However, work also finds that, in regions such as the Southern Ocean, much of this carbon can quickly (within decades) come back into contact with the atmosphere.

Budget calculations of the biological carbon pump are based on the ratio between sedimentation (carbon export) and remineralization (release to the atmosphere). It has been estimated that sinking particles export up to 25% of the carbon captured by phytoplankton in the surface ocean to deeper water layers. About 20% of this export (5% of surface values) is buried in the ocean sediments mainly due to their mineral ballast. During the sinking process, these organic particles are hotspots of microbial activity and represent important loci for organic matter mineralization and nutrient redistribution in the water column.

=== Biomineralization ===
==== Ballast minerals ====
Observations have shown that fluxes of ballast minerals (calcium carbonate, opal, and lithogenic material) and organic carbon fluxes are closely correlated in the bathypelagic zones of the ocean. A large fraction of particulate organic matter occurs in the form of marine snow aggregates (>0.5 mm) composed of phytoplankton, detritus, inorganic mineral grains, and fecal pellets in the ocean. Formation and sinking of these aggregates drive the biological carbon pump via export and sedimentation of organic matter from the surface mixed layer to the deep ocean and sediments. The fraction of organic matter that leaves the upper mixed layer of the ocean is, among other factors, determined by the sinking velocity and microbial remineralisation rate of these aggregates. Recent observations have shown that the fluxes of ballast minerals (calcium carbonate, opal, and lithogenic material) and the organic carbon fluxes are closely correlated in the bathypelagic zones of the ocean. This has led to the hypothesis that organic carbon export is determined by the presence of ballast minerals within settling aggregates.

Mineral ballasting is associated with about 60% of the flux of particulate organic carbon (POC) in the high-latitude North Atlantic, and with about 40% of the flux in the Southern Ocean. Strong correlations exist also in the deep ocean between the presence of ballast minerals and the flux of POC. This suggests ballast minerals enhance POC flux by increasing the sink rate of ballasted aggregates. Ballast minerals could additionally provide aggregated organic matter some protection from degradation.

It has been proposed that organic carbon is better preserved in sinking particles due to increased aggregate density and sinking velocity when ballast minerals are present and/or via protection of the organic matter due to quantitative association to ballast minerals. In 2002, Klaas and Archer observed that about 83% of the global particulate organic carbon (POC) fluxes were associated with carbonate, and suggested carbonate was a more efficient ballast mineral as compared to opal and terrigenous material. They hypothesized that the higher density of calcium carbonate compared to that of opal and the higher abundance of calcium carbonate relative to terrigenous material might be the reason for the efficient ballasting by calcium carbonate. However, the direct effects of ballast minerals on sinking velocity and degradation rates in sinking aggregates are still unclear.

A 2008 study demonstrated copepod fecal pellets produced on a diet of diatoms or coccolithophorids show higher sinking velocities as compared to pellets produced on a nanoflagellate diet. Carbon-specific respiration rates in pellets, however, were similar and independent of mineral content. These results suggest differences in mineral composition do not lead to differential protection of POC against microbial degradation, but the enhanced sinking velocities may result in up to 10-fold higher carbon preservation in pellets containing biogenic minerals as compared to that of pellets without biogenic minerals

Minerals seem to enhance the flocculation of phytoplankton aggregates and may even act as a catalyst in aggregate formation. However, it has also been shown that incorporation of minerals can cause aggregates to fragment into smaller and denser aggregates. This can potentially lower the sinking velocity of the aggregated organic material due to the reduced aggregate sizes, and, thus, lower the total export of organic matter. Conversely, if the incorporation of minerals increases the aggregate density, its size-specific sinking velocity may also increase, which could potentially increase the carbon export. Therefore, there is still a need for better quantitative investigations of how the interactions between minerals and organic aggregates affect the degradation and sinking velocity of the aggregates and, hence, carbon sequestration in the ocean.

==== Remineralisation ====
Remineralisation refers to the breakdown or transformation of organic matter (those molecules derived from a biological source) into its simplest inorganic forms. These transformations form a crucial link within ecosystems as they are responsible for liberating the energy stored in organic molecules and recycling matter within the system to be reused as nutrients by other organisms. What fraction does escape remineralisation varies depending on the location. For example, in the North Sea, values of carbon deposition are ~1% of primary production while that value is <0.5% in the open oceans on average. Therefore, most of nutrients remain in the water column, recycled by the biota. Heterotrophic organisms will utilize the materials produced by the autotrophic (and chemotrophic) organisms and via respiration will remineralise the compounds from the organic form back to inorganic, making them available for primary producers again.

For most areas of the ocean, the highest rates of carbon remineralisation occur at depths between 100–1,200 m (330–3,940 ft) in the water column, decreasing down to about 1,200 m (3,900 ft) where remineralisation rates remain pretty constant at 0.1 μmol kg^{−1} yr^{−1}. This provides the most nutrients available for primary producers within the photic zone, though it leaves the upper surface waters starved of inorganic nutrients. Most remineralisation is done with dissolved organic carbon (DOC). Studies have shown that it is larger sinking particles that transport matter down to the sea floor while suspended particles and dissolved organics are mostly consumed by remineralisation. This happens in part due to the fact that organisms must typically ingest nutrients smaller than they are, often by orders of magnitude. With the microbial community making up 90% of marine biomass, it is particles smaller than the microbes (on the order of 10^{−6}) that will be taken up for remineralisation.

=== Key role of phytoplankton ===
Phytoplankton

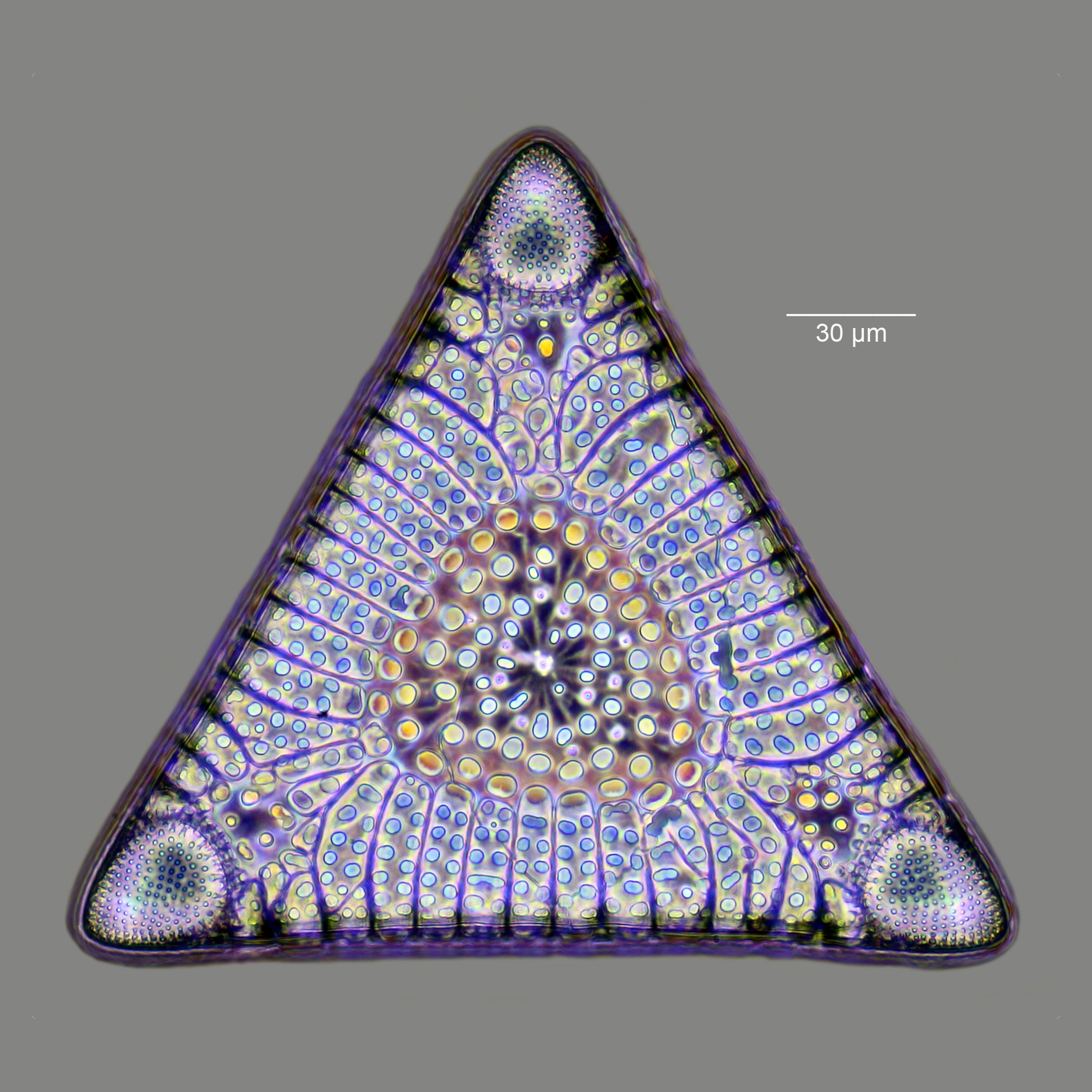
Glass shell (frustule) of a diatom

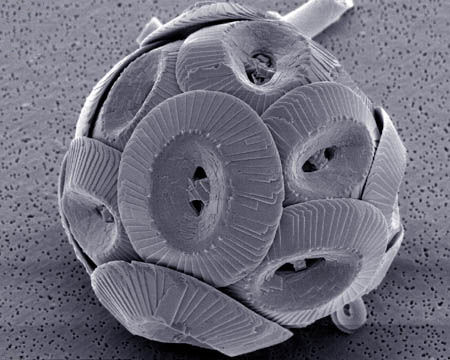
Coccolithophores help power the carbonate pump by producing hard structures out of calcium carbonate which eventually sink to the ocean floor

Marine phytoplankton perform half of all photosynthesis on Earth and directly influence global biogeochemical cycles and the climate, yet how they will respond to future global change is unknown. Carbon dioxide is one of the principal drivers of global change and has been identified as one of the major challenges in the 21st century. Carbon dioxide (CO_{2}) generated during anthropogenic activities such as deforestation and burning of fossil fuels for energy generation rapidly dissolves in the surface ocean and lowers seawater pH, while CO_{2} remaining in the atmosphere increases global temperatures and leads to increased ocean thermal stratification. While CO_{2} concentration in the atmosphere is estimated to be about 270 ppm before the industrial revolution, it has currently increased to about 400 ppm and is expected to reach 800–1000 ppm by the end of this century according to the "business as usual" CO_{2} emission scenario.

Marine ecosystems are a major sink for atmospheric CO_{2} and take up similar amount of CO_{2} as terrestrial ecosystems, currently accounting for the removal of nearly one third of anthropogenic CO_{2} emissions from the atmosphere. The net transfer of CO_{2} from the atmosphere to the oceans and then sediments, is mainly a direct consequence of the combined effect of the solubility and the biological pump. While the solubility pump serves to concentrate dissolved inorganic carbon (CO_{2} plus bicarbonate and carbonate ions) in the deep oceans, the biological carbon pump (a key natural process and a major component of the global carbon cycle that regulates atmospheric CO_{2} levels) transfers both organic and inorganic carbon fixed by primary producers (phytoplankton) in the euphotic zone to the ocean interior and subsequently to the underlying sediments. Thus, the biological pump takes carbon out of contact with the atmosphere for several thousand years or longer and maintains atmospheric CO_{2} at significantly lower levels than would be the case if it did not exist. An ocean without a biological pump, which transfers roughly 11 Gt C yr^{−1} into the ocean's interior, would result in atmospheric CO_{2} levels ~400 ppm higher than present day.

Passow and Carlson defined sedimentation out of the surface layer (at approximately 100 m depth) as the "export flux" and that out of the mesopelagic zone (at approximately 1000 m depth) as the "sequestration flux". Once carbon is transported below the mesopelagic zone, it remains in the deep sea for 100 years or longer, hence the term "sequestration" flux. According to the modelling results of Buesseler and Boyd between 1% and 40% of the primary production is exported out of the euphotic zone, which attenuates exponentially towards the base of the mesopelagic zone and only about 1% of the surface production reaches the sea floor. The export efficiency of particulate organic carbon (POC) shows regional variability. For instance, in the North Atlantic, over 40% of net primary production is exported out of the euphotic zone as compared to only 10% in the South Pacific, and this is driven in part by the composition of the phytoplankton community including cell size and composition (see below). Exported organic carbon is remineralized, that is, respired back to CO_{2} in the oceanic water column at depth, mainly by heterotrophic microbes and zooplankton. Thus, the biological carbon pump maintains a vertical gradient in the concentration of dissolved inorganic carbon (DIC), with higher values at increased ocean depth. This deep-ocean DIC returns to the atmosphere on millennial timescales through thermohaline circulation.

In 2001, Hugh et al. expressed the efficiency of the biological pump as the amount of carbon exported from the surface layer (export production) divided by the total amount produced by photosynthesis (overall production). Modelling studies by Buesseler and Boyd revealed that the overall transfer efficiency of the biological pump is determined by a combination of factors: seasonality; the composition of phytoplankton species; the fragmentation of particles by zooplankton; and the solubilization of particles by microbes. In addition, the efficiency of the biological pump is also dependent on the aggregation and disaggregation of organic-rich aggregates and interaction between POC aggregates and suspended "ballast" minerals. Ballast minerals (silicate and carbonate biominerals and dust) are the major constituents of particles that leave the ocean surface via sinking. They are typically denser than seawater and most organic matter, thus, providing a large part of the density differential needed for sinking of the particles. Aggregation of particles increases vertical flux by transforming small suspended particles into larger, rapidly-sinking ones. It plays an important role in the sedimentation of phytodetritus from surface layer phytoplankton blooms. As illustrated by Turner in 2015, the vertical flux of sinking particles is mainly due to a combination of fecal pellets, marine snow and direct sedimentation of phytoplankton blooms, which are typically composed of diatoms, coccolithophorids, dinoflagellates and other plankton. Marine snow comprises macroscopic organic aggregates >500 μm in size and originates from clumps of aggregated phytoplankton (phytodetritus), discarded appendicularian houses, fecal matter and other miscellaneous detrital particles, Appendicularians secrete mucous feeding structures or "houses" to collect food particles and discard and renew them up to 40 times a day . Discarded appendicularian houses are highly abundant (thousands per m3 in surface waters) and are microbial hotspots with high concentrations of bacteria, ciliates, flagellates and phytoplankton. These discarded houses are therefore among the most important sources of aggregates directly produced by zooplankton in terms of carbon cycling potential.

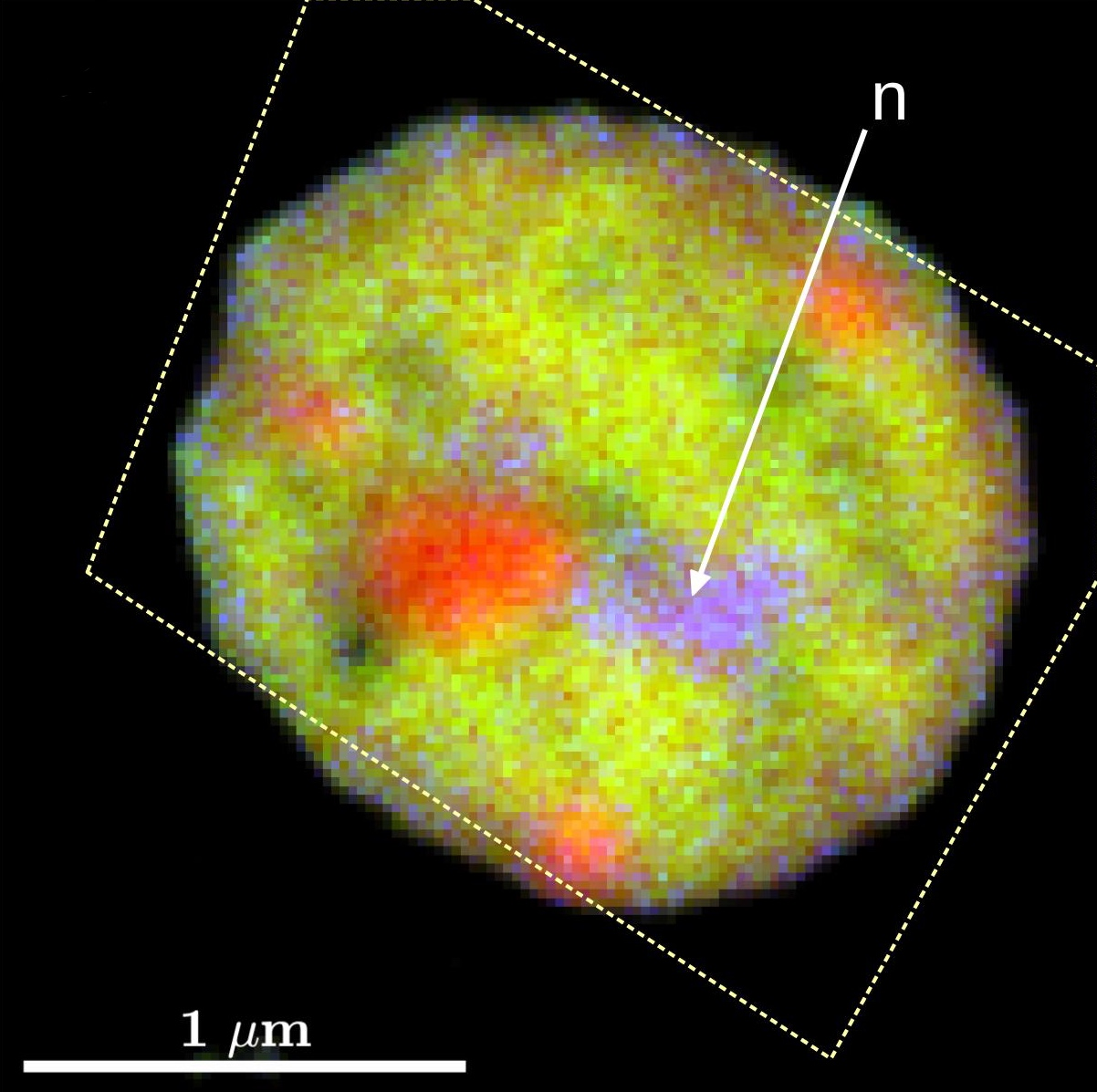
The nitrogen fixing cyanobacteria Cyanothece sp. ATCC 51142

The composition of the phytoplankton community in the euphotic zone largely determines the quantity and quality of organic matter that sinks to depth. The main functional groups of marine phytoplankton that contribute to export production include nitrogen fixers (diazotrophic cyanobacteria), silicifiers (diatoms) and calcifiers (coccolithophores). Each of these phytoplankton groups differ in the size and composition of their cell walls and coverings, which influence their sinking velocities. For example, autotrophic picoplankton (0.2–2 μm in diameter)—which include taxa such as cyanobacteria (e.g., Prochlorococcus spp. and Synechococcus spp.) and prasinophytes (various genera of eukaryotes <2 μm)—are believed to contribute much less to carbon export from surface layers due to their small size, slow sinking velocities (<0.5 m/day) and rapid turnover in the microbial loop. In contrast, larger phytoplankton cells such as diatoms (2–500 μm in diameter) are very efficient in transporting carbon to depth by forming rapidly sinking aggregates. They are unique among phytoplankton, because they require Si in the form of silicic acid (Si(OH)4) for growth and production of their frustules, which are made of biogenic silica (bSiO2) and act as ballast. According to the reports of Miklasz and Denny, the sinking velocities of diatoms can range from 0.4 to 35 m/day. Analogously, coccolithophores are covered with calcium carbonate plates called 'coccoliths', which are central to aggregation and ballasting, producing sinking velocities of nearly 5 m/day. Although it has been assumed that picophytoplankton, characterizing vast oligotrophic areas of the ocean, do not contribute substantially to the particulate organic carbon (POC) flux, in 2007 Richardson and Jackson suggested that all phytoplankton, including picoplankton cells, contribute equally to POC export. They proposed alternative pathways for picoplankton carbon cycling, which rely on aggregation as a mechanism for both direct sinking (the export of picoplankton as POC) and mesozooplankton- or large filter feeder-mediated sinking of picoplankton-based production.

=== Zooplankton grazing ===
==== Sloppy feeding ====
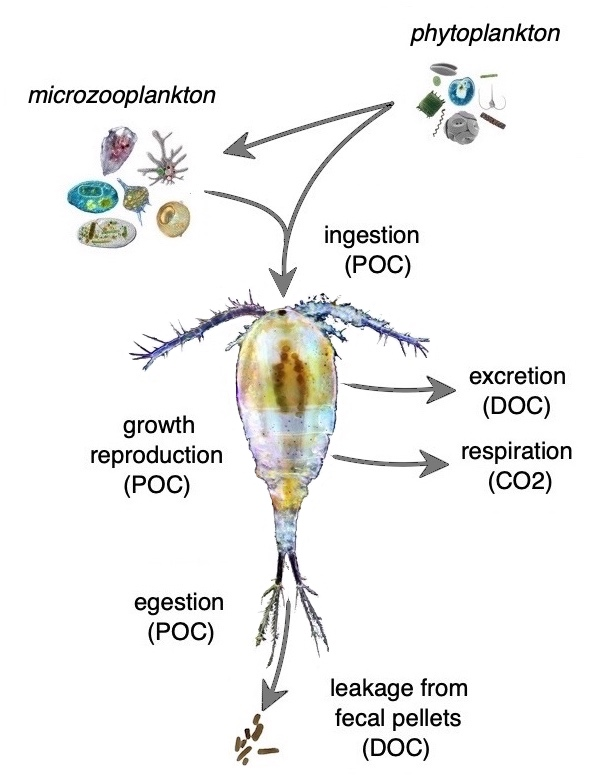
Sloppy feeding by zooplankton
DOC = dissolved organic carbon
POC = particulate organic carbon.
Adapted from Møller et al. (2005), Saba et al. (2009) and Steinberg et al. (2017).

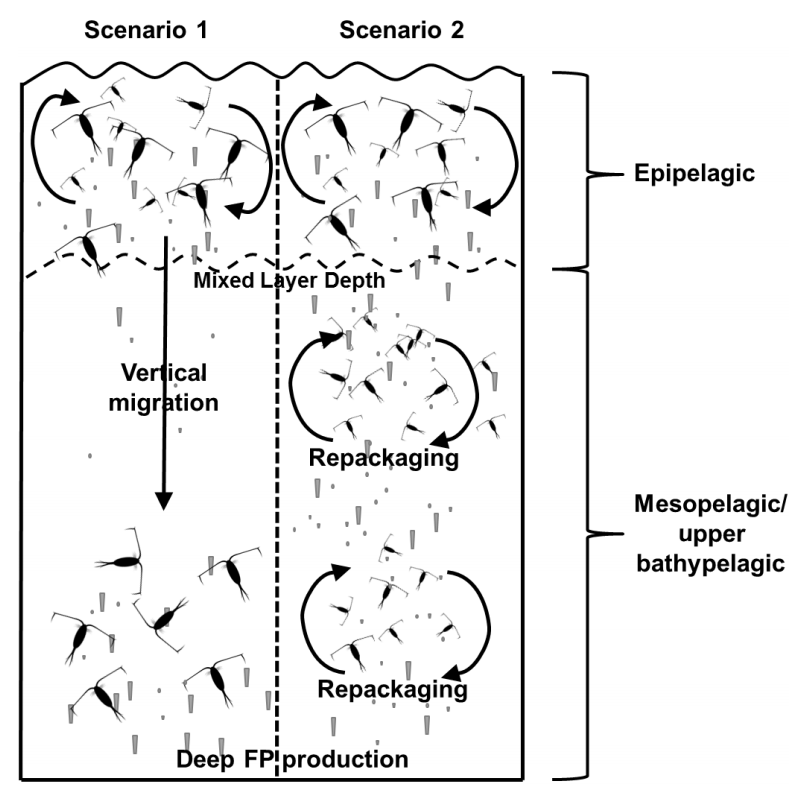
Mesopelagic fecal pellet production
On the left above, intact fecal pellets reach the deep ocean via vertical migration of zooplankton, whereas on the right fecal pellets at depth result from in situ repackaging of sinking detritus by deep-dwelling zooplankton. Actual mechanisms are likely to include both scenarios.

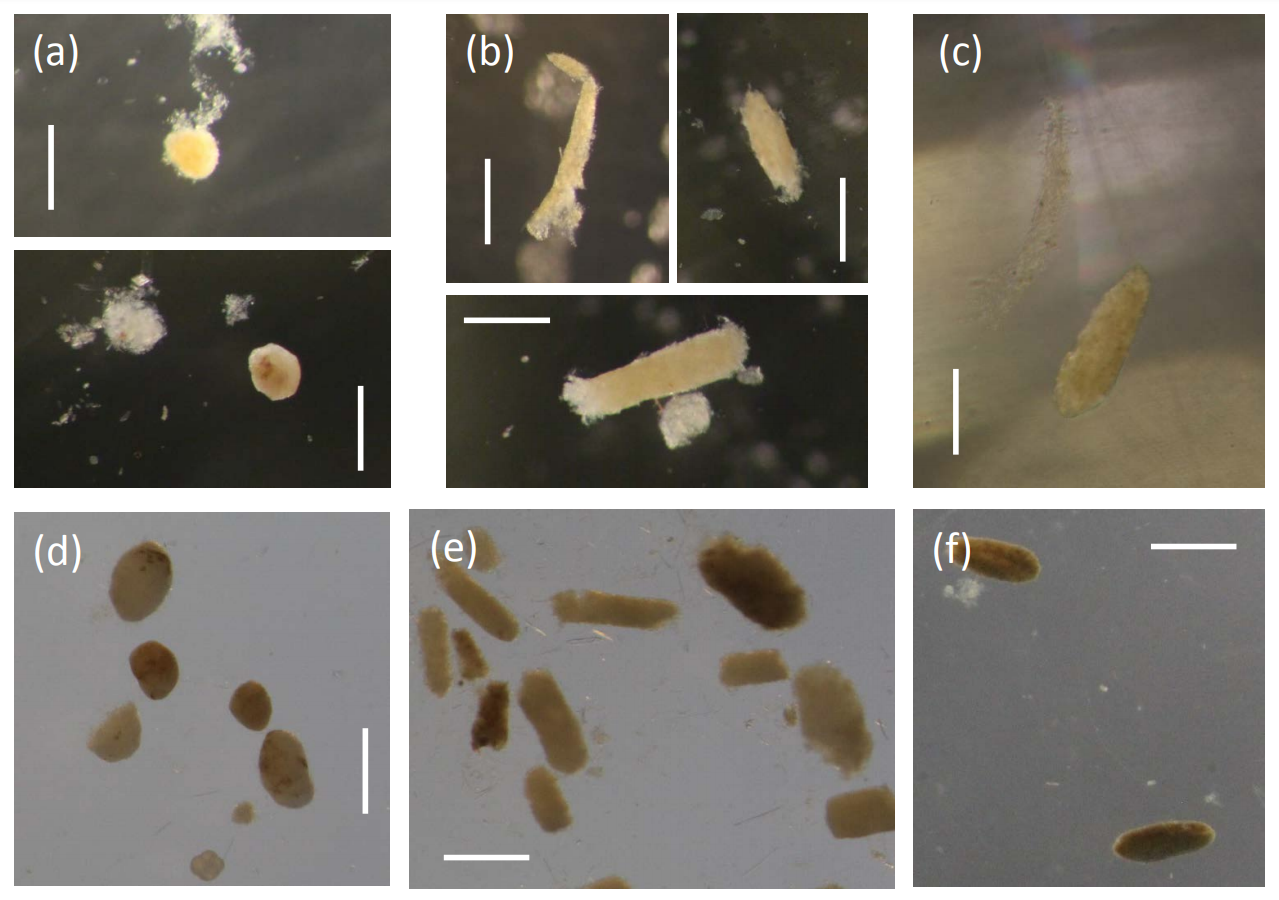
Morphology of zooplankton fecal pellets Collected from marine snow catchers (a–c) and sediment traps (d–f). Morphological classes: (a, d) round, (b, e) cylindrical, and (c, f) ovoid. Scale bar = 0.5 mm

In addition to linking primary producers to higher trophic levels in marine food webs, zooplankton also play an important role as "recyclers" of carbon and other nutrients that significantly impact marine biogeochemical cycles, including the biological pump. This is particularly the case with copepods and krill, and is especially important in oligotrophic waters of the open ocean. Through sloppy feeding, excretion, egestion, and leaching of fecal pellets, zooplankton release dissolved organic matter (DOM) which controls DOM cycling and supports the microbial loop. Absorption efficiency, respiration, and prey size all further complicate how zooplankton are able to transform and deliver carbon to the deep ocean.

Excretion and sloppy feeding (the physical breakdown of food source) make up 80% and 20% of crustacean zooplankton-mediated DOM release respectively. In the same study, fecal pellet leaching was found to be an insignificant contributor. For protozoan grazers, DOM is released primarily through excretion and egestion and gelatinous zooplankton can also release DOM through the production of mucus. Leaching of fecal pellets can extend from hours to days after initial egestion and its effects can vary depending on food concentration and quality. Various factors can affect how much DOM is released from zooplankton individuals or populations.

==== Fecal pellets ====
The fecal pellets of zooplankton can be important vehicles for the transfer of particulate organic carbon (POC) to the deep ocean, often making large contributions to the carbon sequestration. The size distribution of the copepod community indicates high numbers of small fecal pellets are produced in the epipelagic. However, small fecal pellets are rare in the deeper layers, suggesting they are not transferred efficiently to depth. This means small fecal pellets make only minor contributions to fecal pellet fluxes in the meso- and bathypelagic, particularly in terms of carbon. In a study is focussed on the Scotia Sea, which contains some of the most productive regions in the Southern Ocean, the dominant fecal pellets in the upper mesopelagic were cylindrical and elliptical, while ovoid fecal pellets were dominant in the bathypelagic. The change in fecal pellet morphology, as well as size distribution, points to the repacking of surface fecal pellets in the mesopelagic and in situ production in the lower meso- and bathypelagic, which may be augmented by inputs of fecal pellets via zooplankton vertical migrations. This suggests the flux of carbon to the deeper layers within the Southern Ocean is strongly modulated by meso- and bathypelagic zooplankton, meaning that the community structure in these zones has a major impact on the efficiency of the fecal pellet transfer to ocean depths.

Absorption efficiency (AE) is the proportion of food absorbed by plankton that determines how available the consumed organic materials are in meeting the required physiological demands. Depending on the feeding rate and prey composition, variations in AE may lead to variations in fecal pellet production, and thus regulates how much organic material is recycled back to the marine environment. Low feeding rates typically lead to high AE and small, dense pellets, while high feeding rates typically lead to low AE and larger pellets with more organic content. Another contributing factor to DOM release is respiration rate. Physical factors such as oxygen availability, pH, and light conditions may affect overall oxygen consumption and how much carbon is loss from zooplankton in the form of respired CO_{2}. The relative sizes of zooplankton and prey also mediate how much carbon is released via sloppy feeding. Smaller prey are ingested whole, whereas larger prey may be fed on more "sloppily", that is more biomatter is released through inefficient consumption. There is also evidence that diet composition can impact nutrient release, with carnivorous diets releasing more dissolved organic carbon (DOC) and ammonium than omnivorous diets.

=== Microbial loop ===
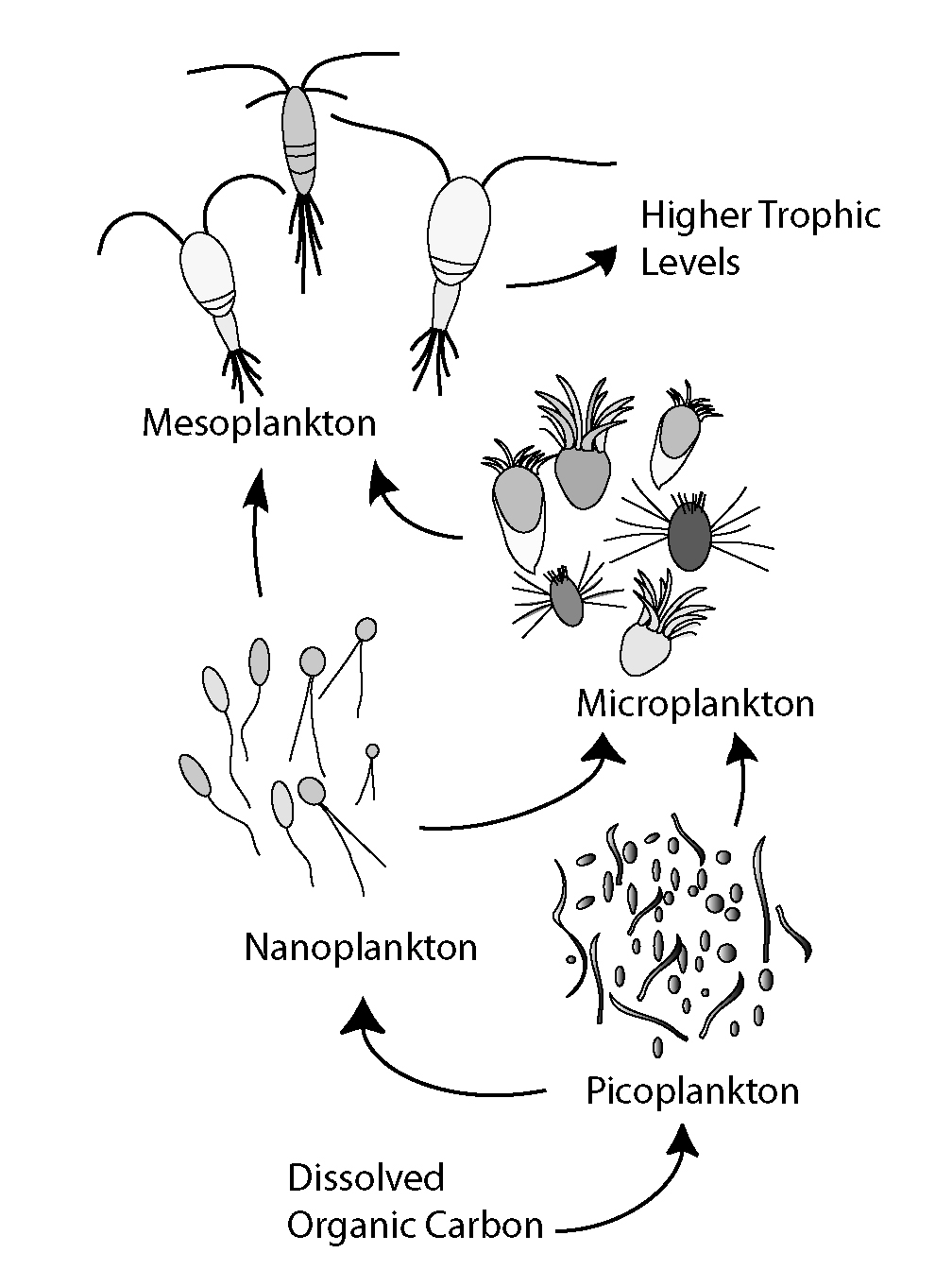
The microbial loop is a marine trophic pathway which incorporates dissolved organic carbon (DOC) into the food chain

==== Bacterial lysis ====
The microbial loop describes a trophic pathway in the marine microbial food web where dissolved organic carbon (DOC) is returned to higher trophic levels via its incorporation into bacterial biomass, and then coupled with the classic food chain formed by phytoplankton-zooplankton-nekton. The term microbial loop was coined by Farooq Azam, Tom Fenchel et al. in 1983 to include the role played by bacteria in the carbon and nutrient cycles of the marine environment. In general, dissolved organic carbon is introduced into the ocean environment from bacterial lysis, the leakage or exudation of fixed carbon from phytoplankton (e.g., mucilaginous exopolymer from diatoms), sudden cell senescence, sloppy feeding by zooplankton, the excretion of waste products by aquatic animals, or the breakdown or dissolution of organic particles from terrestrial plants and soils. Bacteria in the microbial loop decompose this particulate detritus to utilize this energy-rich matter for growth. Since more than 95% of organic matter in marine ecosystems consists of polymeric, high molecular weight (HMW) compounds (e.g., protein, polysaccharides, lipids), only a small portion of total dissolved organic matter (DOM) is readily utilizable to most marine organisms at higher trophic levels. This means that dissolved organic carbon is not available directly to most marine organisms; marine bacteria introduce this organic carbon into the food web, resulting in additional energy becoming available to higher trophic levels.

==== Viral shunt ====
Viral shunt

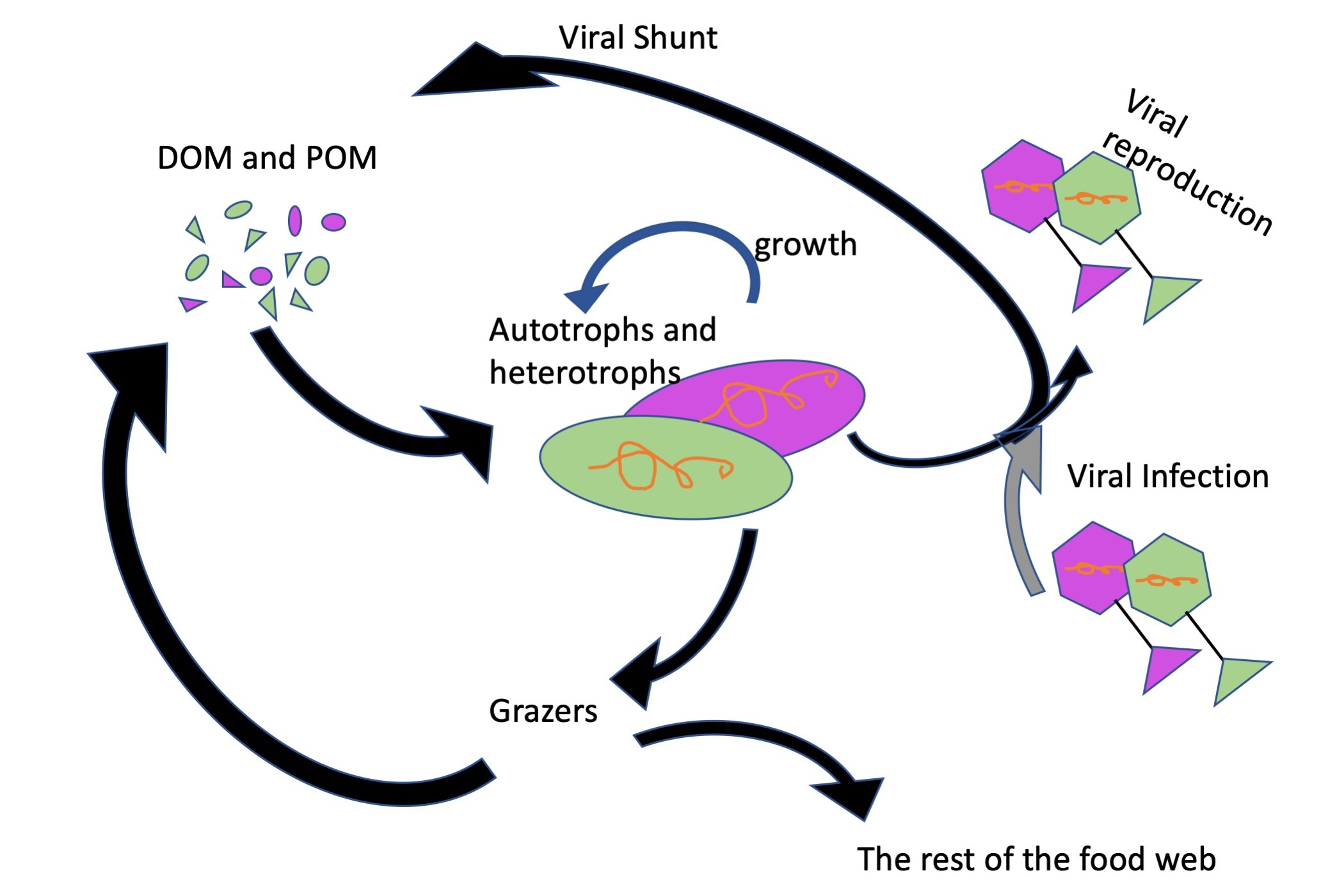
The viral shunt recycles DOM throughout the marine food web

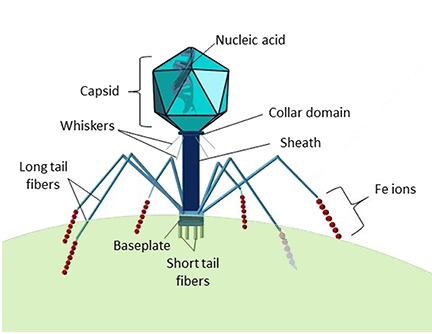
Typical marine virus

As much as 25% of the primary production from phytoplankton in the global oceans may be recycled within the microbial loop through viral shunting. The viral shunt is a mechanism whereby marine viruses prevent microbial particulate organic matter (POM) from migrating up trophic levels by recycling them into dissolved organic matter (DOM), which can be readily taken up by microorganisms. The DOM recycled by the viral shunt pathway is comparable to the amount generated by the other main sources of marine DOM. Viruses can easily infect microorganisms in the microbial loop due to their relative abundance compared to microbes. Prokaryotic and eukaryotic mortality contribute to carbon nutrient recycling through cell lysis. There is evidence as well of nitrogen (specifically ammonium) regeneration. This nutrient recycling helps stimulates microbial growth.

=== Role of mixoplankton ===
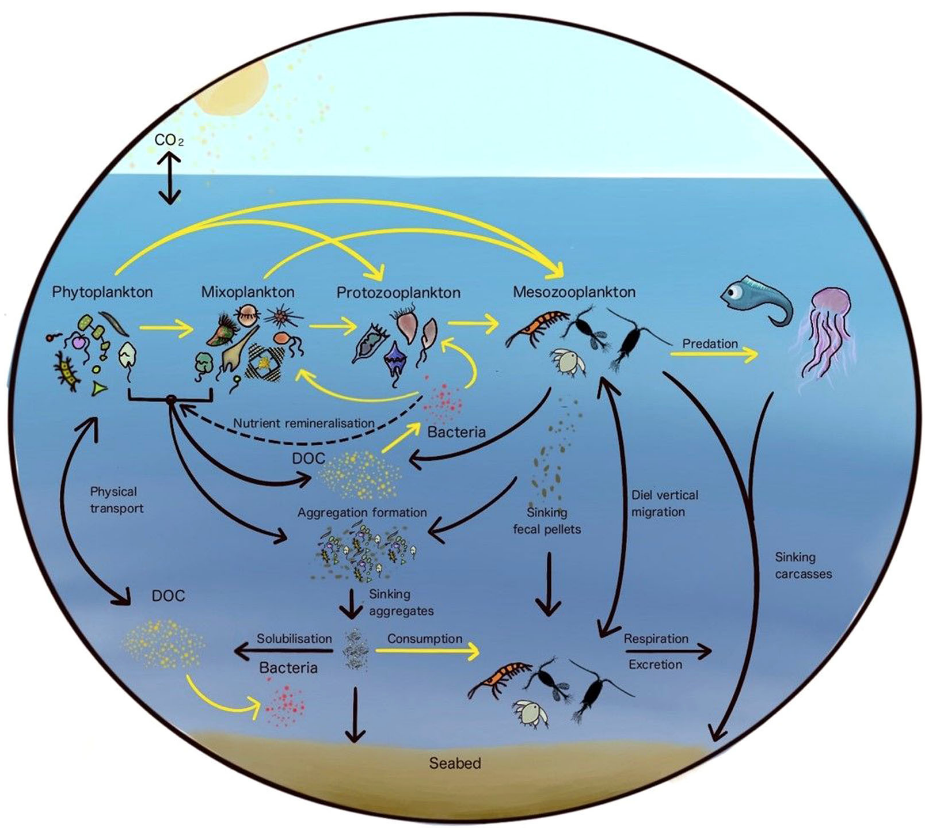
The biological carbon pump including mixoplankton. Also shown are phytoplankton and protozooplankton (protozoan plankton) as representatives of protists, and mesozooplankton as direct metazoan consumers. The yellow lines indicate trophic interactions, whereas the black lines indicate other physicochemical processes.

=== Macroorganisms ===
==== Jelly fall ====
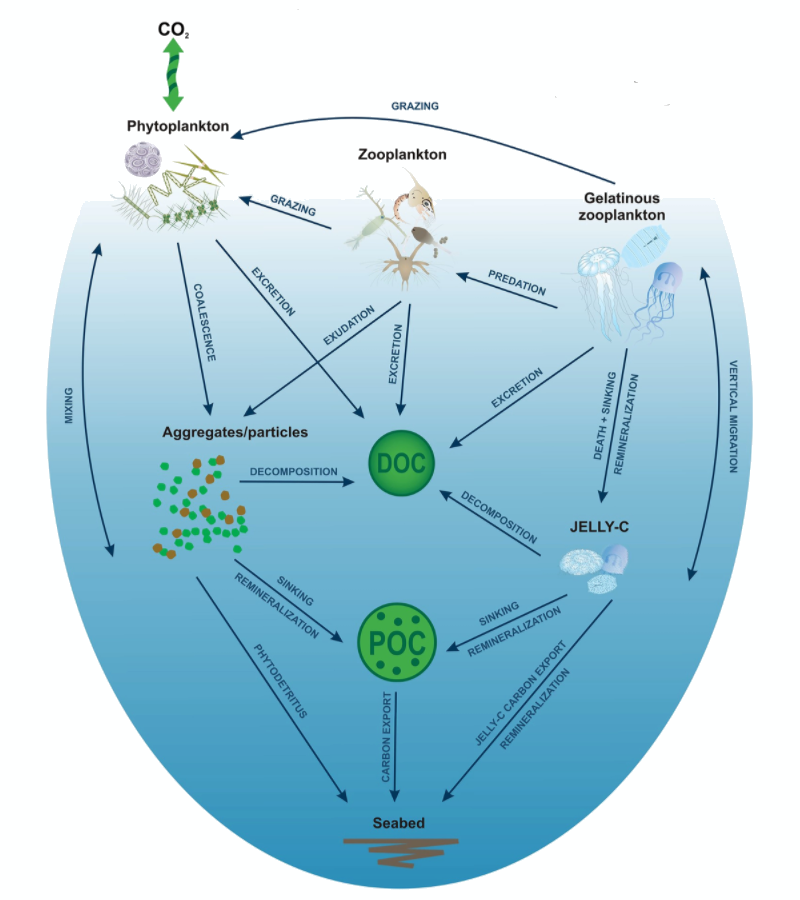
Gelatinous zooplankton biological pump How jelly carbon fits in the biological pump. A schematic representation of the biological pump and the biogeochemical processes that remove elements from the surface ocean by sinking biogenic particles including jelly carbon.

Jelly-falls are marine carbon cycling events whereby gelatinous zooplankton, primarily cnidarians, sink to the seafloor and enhance carbon and nitrogen fluxes via rapidly sinking particulate organic matter. These events provide nutrition to benthic megafauna and bacteria. Jelly-falls have been implicated as a major "gelatinous pathway" for the sequestration of labile biogenic carbon through the biological pump. These events are common in protected areas with high levels of primary production and water quality suitable to support cnidarian species. These areas include estuaries and several studies have been conducted in fjords of Norway.

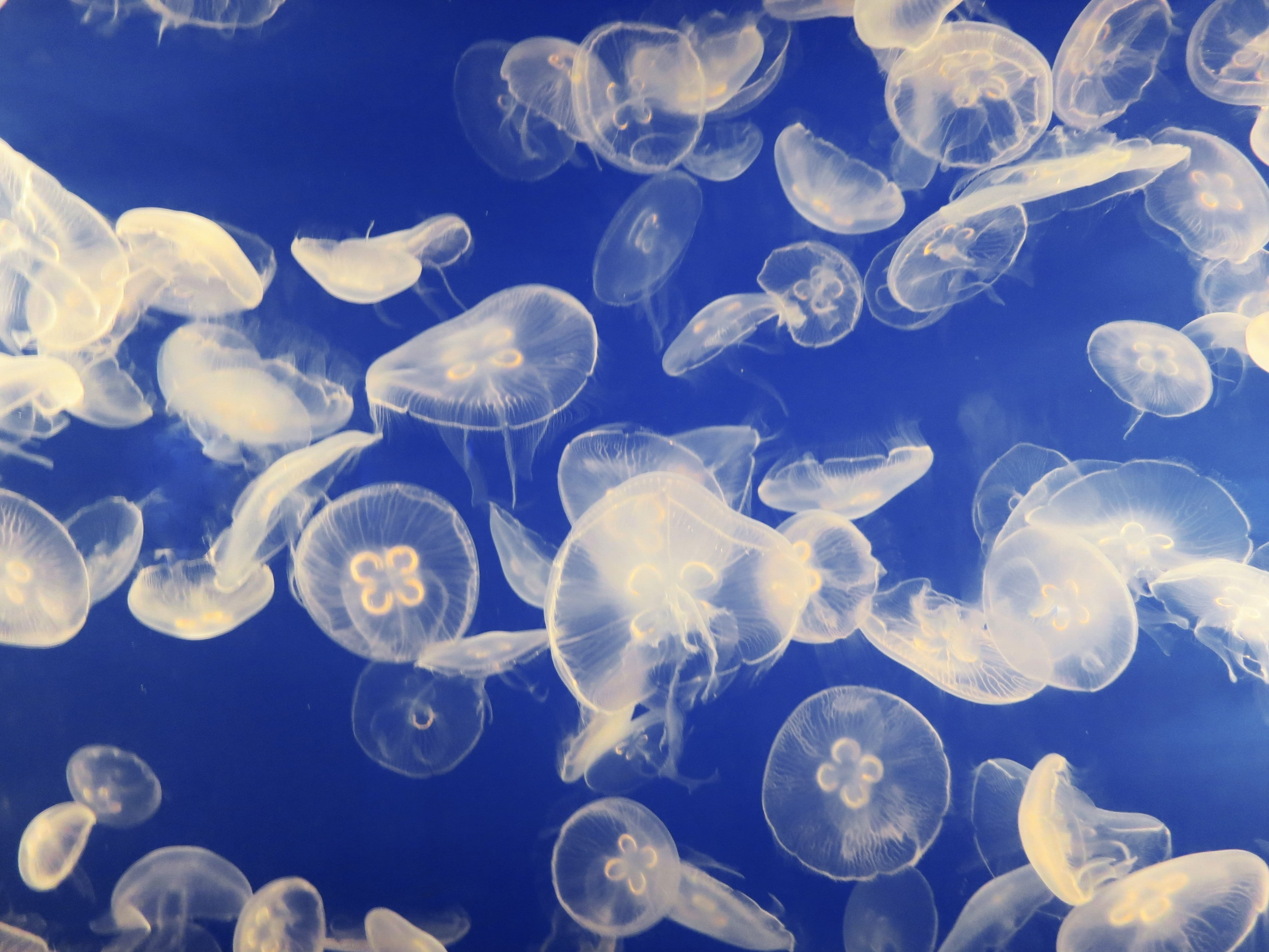
Jellyfish are easy to capture and digest and may be more important as carbon sinks than was previously thought.

==== Whale pump ====
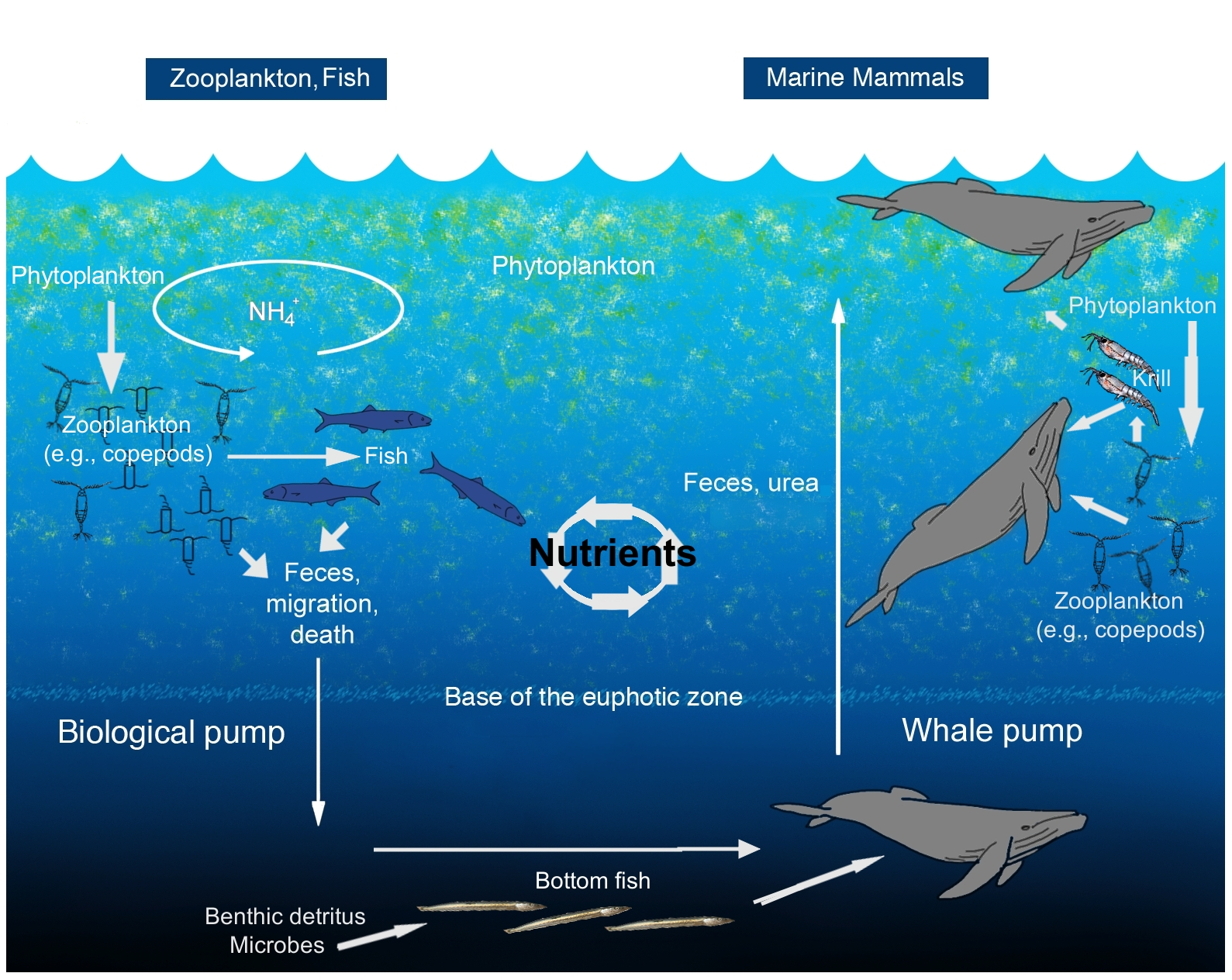
The whale pump is the role played by whales and other marine mammals recycling nutrients in the ocean

Whales and other marine mammals also enhance primary productivity in their feeding areas by concentrating nitrogen near the surface through the release of flocculent fecal plumes. For example, whales and seals may be responsible for replenishing more nitrogen in the Gulf of Maine's euphotic zone than the input of all rivers combined. This upward whale pump played a much larger role before industrial fishing devastated marine mammal stocks, when recycling of nitrogen was likely more than three times the atmospheric nitrogen input.

The biological pump mediates the removal of carbon and nitrogen from the euphotic zone through the downward flux of aggregates, feces, and vertical migration of invertebrates and fish. Copepods and other zooplankton produce sinking fecal pellets and contribute to downward transport of dissolved and particulate organic matter by respiring and excreting at depth during migration cycles, thus playing an important role in the export of nutrients (N, P, and Fe) from surface waters.

Zooplankton feed in the euphotic zone and export nutrients via sinking fecal pellets, and vertical migration. Fish typically release nutrients at the same depth at which they feed. Excretion for marine mammals, tethered to the surface for respiration, is expected to be shallower in the water column than where they feed.

Marine mammals provide important ecosystem services. On a global scale, they can influence climate, through fertilization events and the export of carbon from surface waters to the deep sea through sinking whale carcasses. In coastal areas, whales retain nutrients locally, increasing ecosystem productivity and perhaps raising the carrying capacity for other marine consumers, including commercial fish species. It has been estimated that, in terms of carbon sequestration, one whale is equivalent to thousands of trees.

=== Vertical migrations ===
Diel vertically migrating krill, salps, smaller zooplankton and fish can actively transport carbon to depth by consuming POC in the surface layer at night, and metabolising it at their daytime, mesopelagic residence depths. Depending on species life history, active transport may occur on a seasonal basis as well.

Without vertical migration the biological pump wouldn't be nearly as efficient. Organisms migrate up to feed at night so when they migrate back to depth during the day they defecate large sinking fecal pellets. Whilst some larger fecal pellets can sink quite fast, the speed that organisms move back to depth is still faster. At night organisms are in the top 100 metres of the water column, but during the day they move down to between 800 and 1000 metres. If organisms were to defecate at the surface it would take the fecal pellets days to reach the depth that they reach in a matter of hours. Therefore, by releasing fecal pellets at depth they have almost 1000 metres less to travel to get to the deep ocean. This is something known as active transport. The organisms are playing a more active role in moving organic matter down to depths. Because a large majority of the deep sea, especially marine microbes, depends on nutrients falling down, the quicker they can reach the ocean floor the better.

Zooplankton and salps play a large role in the active transport of fecal pellets. 15–50% of zooplankton biomass is estimated to migrate, accounting for the transport of 5–45% of particulate organic nitrogen to depth. Salps are large gelatinous plankton that can vertically migrate 800 metres and eat large amounts of food at the surface. They have a very long gut retention time, so fecal pellets usually are released at maximum depth. Salps are also known for having some of the largest fecal pellets. Because of this they have a very fast sinking rate, small detritus particles are known to aggregate on them. This makes them sink that much faster. So while currently there is still much research being done on why organisms vertically migrate, it is clear that vertical migration plays a large role in the active transport of dissolved organic matter to depth.

==== Lipid pump ====
The lipid pump sequesters carbon from the ocean's surface to deeper waters via lipids associated with overwintering vertically migratory zooplankton. Lipids are a class of hydrocarbon rich, nitrogen and phosphorus deficient compounds essential for cellular structures. The lipid associated carbon enters the deep ocean as carbon dioxide produced by respiration of lipid reserves and as organic matter from the mortality of zooplankton. Compared to the more general biological pump, the lipid pump also results in a lipid shunt, where other nutrients like nitrogen and phosphorus that are consumed in excess must be excreted back to the surface environment, and thus are not removed from the surface mixed layer of the ocean. This means that the carbon transported by the lipid pump does not limit the availability of essential nutrients in the ocean surface. Carbon sequestration via the lipid pump is therefore decoupled from nutrient removal, allowing carbon uptake by oceanic primary production to continue. In the Biological Pump, nutrient removal is always coupled to carbon sequestration; primary production is limited as carbon and nutrients are transported to depth together in the form of organic matter. The contribution of the lipid pump to the sequestering of carbon in the deeper waters of the ocean can be substantial: the carbon transported below 1,000 metres (3,300 ft) by copepods of the genus Calanus in the Arctic Ocean almost equals that transported below the same depth annually by particulate organic carbon (POC) in this region. A significant fraction of this transported carbon would not return to the surface due to respiration and mortality. Research is ongoing to more precisely estimate the amount that remains at depth. The export rate of the lipid pump may vary from 1–9.3 g C m^{−2} y^{−1} across temperate and subpolar regions containing seasonally-migrating zooplankton. The role of zooplankton, and particularly copepods, in the food web is crucial to the survival of higher trophic level organisms whose primary source of nutrition is copepods. With warming oceans and increasing melting of ice caps due to climate change, the organisms associated with the lipid pump may be affected, thus influencing the survival of many commercially important fish and endangered marine mammals. As a new and previously unquantified component of oceanic carbon sequestration, further research on the lipid pump can improve the accuracy and overall understanding of carbon fluxes in global oceanic systems.

=== Bioluminescent shunt ===
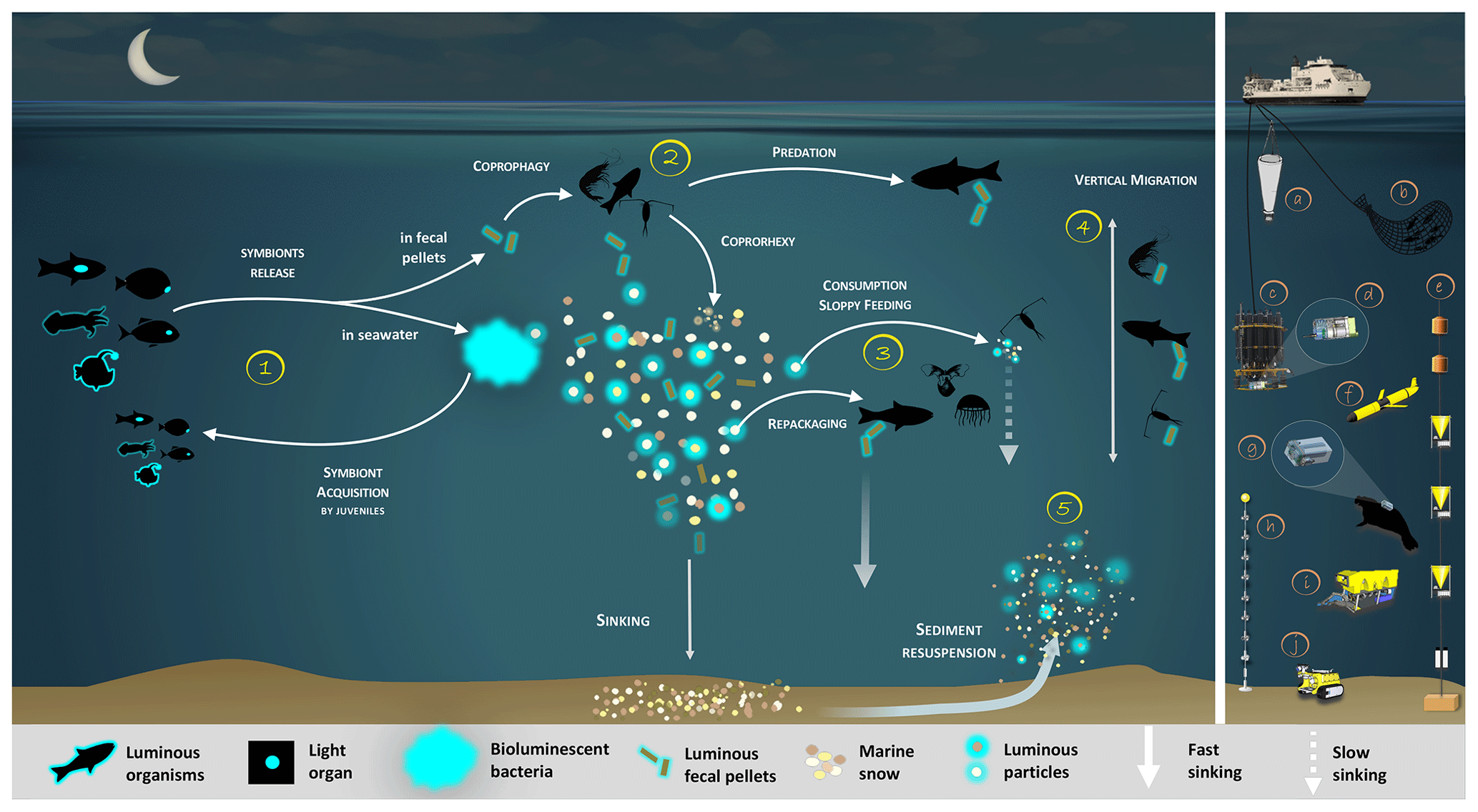
Bioluminescence shunt in the biological carbon pump in the ocean

Luminous bacteria in light organ symbioses are successively acquired by host (squid, fish) from the seawater while they are juveniles, then regularly released into the ocean.

In the diagram on the right, depending on the light organ position, luminous bacteria are released from their guts into fecal pellets or directly into the seawater (step 1). Motile luminous bacteria colonize organic matter sinking along the water column. Bioluminescent bacteria colonising fecal pellets and particles influence zooplankton consumption rates. Such visual markers increase detection ("bait hypothesis"), attraction and finally predation by upper trophic levels (step 2). In the mesopelagic, zooplankton and their predators feed on sinking luminous particles and fecal pellets, which form either aggregates (repackaging) of faster sinking rates or fragment organic matter (due to sloppy feeding) with slower sinking rates (step 3).

Filter feeders also aggregate sinking organic matter without particular visual detection and selection of luminous matter. Diel (and seasonal) vertical migrators feeding on luminous food metabolize and release glowing fecal pellets from the surface to the mesopelagic zone (step 4). This implies bioluminescent bacteria dispersion at large spatial scales, for zooplankton or even some fish actively swimming long distances. Luminous bacteria attached to particles sink down to the seafloor, and sediment can be resuspended by oceanographic physical conditions (step 5) and consumed by epi-benthic organisms. Instruments are (a) plankton net, (b) fish net, (c) Niskin water sampler, (d) bathyphotometer, (e) sediment traps, (f) autonomous underwater vehicles, (g) photomultiplier module, (h) astrophysics optical modules ANTARES and (i–j) remotely operated vehicles.

== Quantification ==
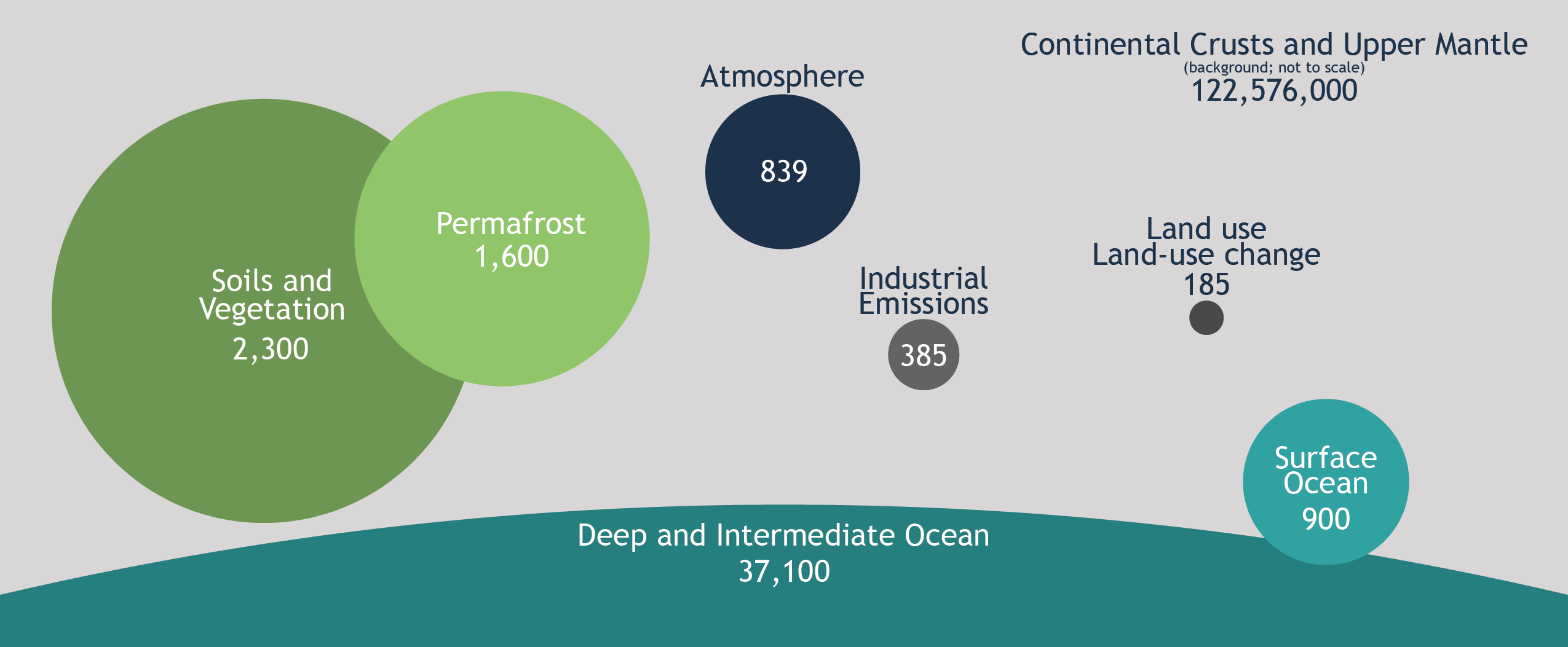
Diagram showing relative sizes (in gigatonnes) of the main storage pools of carbon on Earth. Cumulative changes (thru year 2014) from land use and emissions of fossil carbon are included for comparison.

The geologic component of the carbon cycle operates slowly in comparison to the other parts of the global carbon cycle. It is one of the most important determinants of the amount of carbon in the atmosphere, and thus of global temperatures.

As the biological pump plays an important role in the Earth's carbon cycle, significant effort is spent quantifying its strength. However, because they occur as a result of poorly constrained ecological interactions usually at depth, the processes that form the biological pump are difficult to measure. A common method is to estimate primary production fuelled by nitrate and ammonium as these nutrients have different sources that are related to the remineralisation of sinking material. From these it is possible to derive the so-called f-ratio, a proxy for the local strength of the biological pump. Applying the results of local studies to the global scale is complicated by the role the ocean's circulation plays in different ocean regions.

== Effects of climate change ==
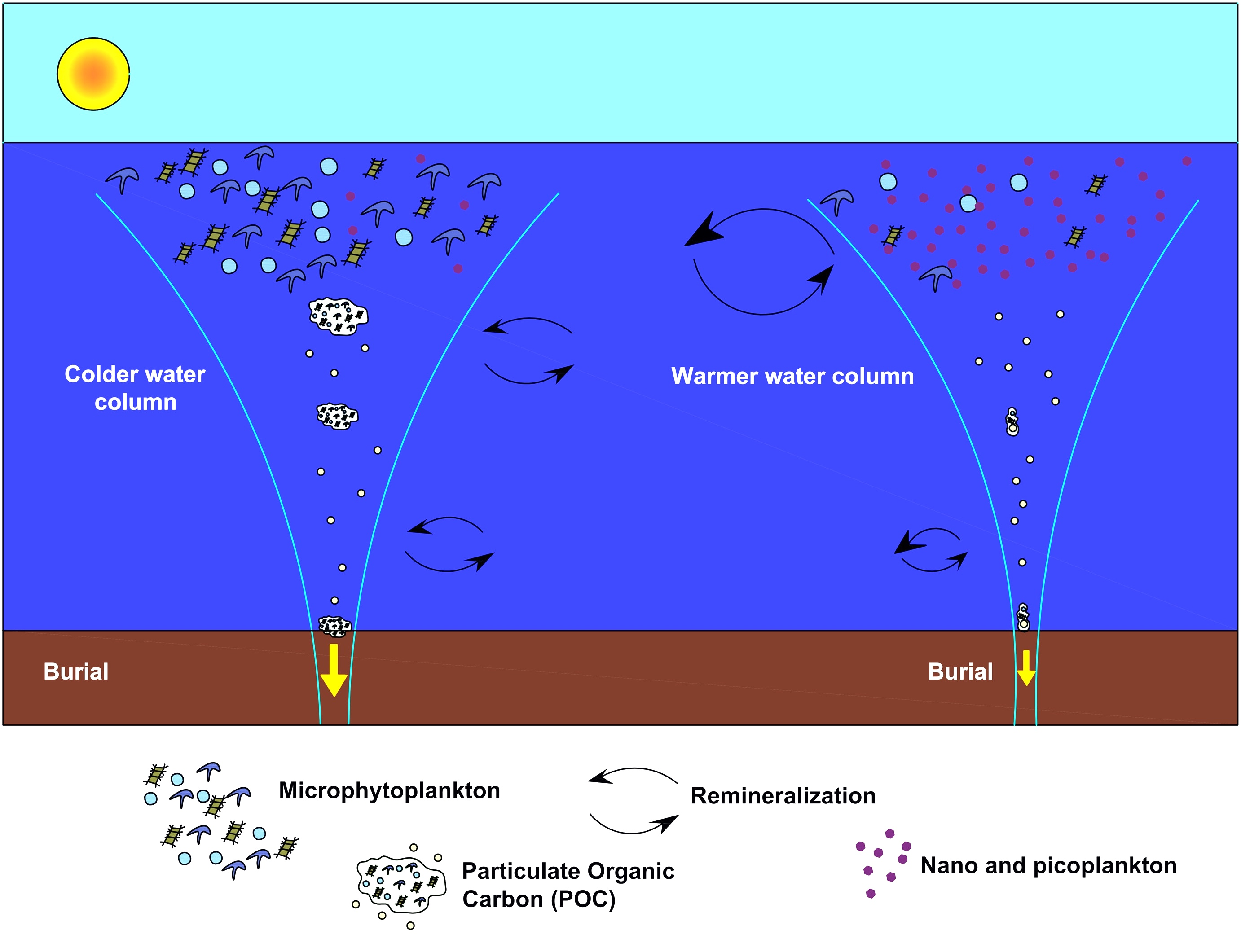
Effect of temperature on the biological pump Effects of different water temperatures on organic carbon export and remineralization: more carbon is sequestered when temperature is colder compared to when is warmer.

Changes in land use, the combustion of fossil fuels, and the production of cement have led to an increase in CO_{2} concentration in the atmosphere. At present, about one third (approximately 2 Pg C y^{−1} = 2 × 10^{15} grams of carbon per year) of anthropogenic emissions of CO_{2} may be entering the ocean, but this is quite uncertain. Some research suggests that a link between elevated CO_{2} and marine primary production exists.

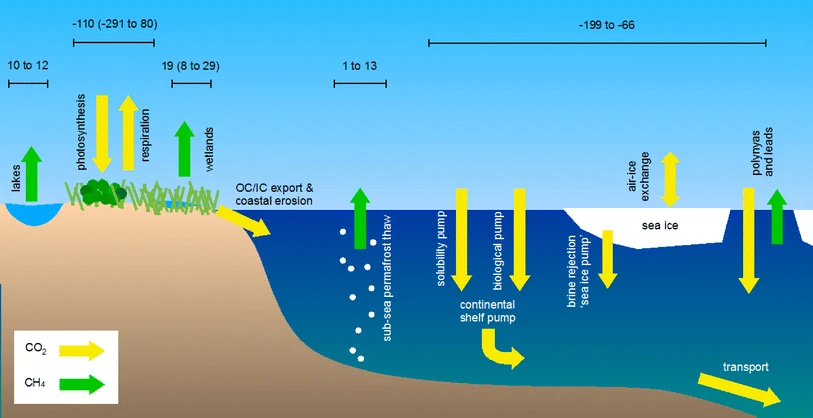
Arctic carbon fluxes influenced by sea ice decline and permafrost thaw

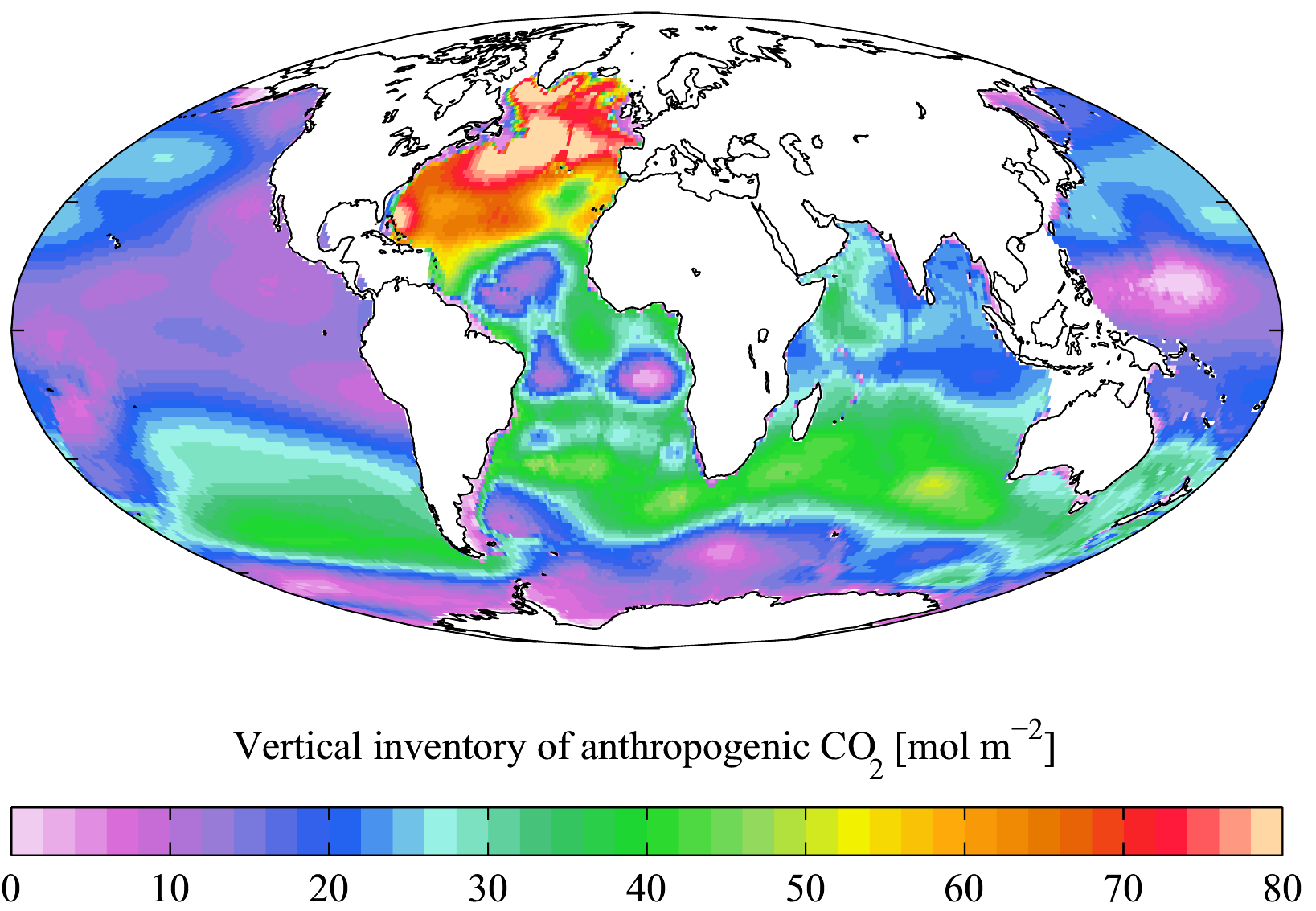
Global estimate of the vertically integrated anthropogenic dissolved inorganic carbon (DIC) in the ocean in recent times (1990s)

Climate change may affect the biological pump in the future by warming and stratifying the surface ocean. It is believed that this could decrease the supply of nutrients to the euphotic zone, reducing primary production there. Also, changes in the ecological success of calcifying organisms caused by ocean acidification may affect the biological pump by altering the strength of the hard tissues pump. This may then have a "knock-on" effect on the soft tissues pump because calcium carbonate acts to ballast sinking organic material.

The second diagram on the right shows some possible effects of sea ice decline and permafrost thaw on Arctic carbon fluxes. On land, plants take up carbon while microorganisms in the soil produce methane and respire CO_{2}. Lakes are net emitters of methane, and organic and inorganic carbon (dissolved and particulate) flow into the ocean through freshwater systems. In the ocean, methane can be released from thawing subsea permafrost, and CO_{2} is absorbed due to an undersaturation of CO_{2} in the water compared with the atmosphere. In addition, multiple fluxes are closely associated to sea ice. Current best estimates of atmospheric fluxes are given in Tg C year^{−1}, where available. Note that the emission estimate for lakes is for the area North of ~50º N rather than the narrower definition of arctic tundra for the other terrestrial fluxes. When available, uncertainty ranges are shown in brackets. The arrows do not represent the size of each flux.

The biological pump is thought to have played significant roles in atmospheric CO_{2} fluctuations during past glacial-interglacial periods. However, it is not yet clear how the biological pump will respond to future climate change. For such predictions to be reasonable, it is important to first decipher the response of phytoplankton, one of the key components of the biological pump to future changes in atmospheric CO_{2}. Due to their phylogenetic diversity, different phytoplankton taxa will likely respond to climate change in different ways. For instance, a decrease in the abundance of diatom is expected due to increased stratification in the future ocean. Diatoms are highly efficient in transporting carbon to depths by forming large, rapidly sinking aggregates and their reduced numbers could in turn lead to decreased carbon export.

Further, decreased ocean pH due to ocean acidification may thwart the ability of coccolithophores to generate calcareous plates, potentially affecting the biological pump; however, it appears that some species are more sensitive than others. Thus, future changes in the relative abundance of these or other phytoplankton taxa could have a marked impact on total ocean productivity, subsequently affecting ocean biogeochemistry and carbon storage.

A 2015 study determined that coccolithophore concentrations in the North Atlantic have increased by an order of magnitude since the 1960s and an increase in absorbed CO_{2}, as well as temperature, were modeled to be the most likely cause of this increase.

In a 2017 study, scientists used species distribution modelling (SDM) to predict the future global distribution of two phytoplankton species important to the biological pump: the diatom Chaetoceros diadema and the coccolithophore Emiliania huxleyi. They employed environmental data described in the IPCC Representative Concentration Pathways scenario 8.5, which predicts radiative forcing in the year 2100 relative to pre-industrial values. Their modelling results predicted that the total ocean area covered by C. diadema and E. huxleyi would decline by 8% and 16%, respectively, under the examined climate scenario. They predicted changes in the range and distribution of these two phytoplankton species under these future ocean conditions, if realized, might result in reduced contribution to carbon sequestration via the biological pump. In 2019, a study indicated that at current rates of seawater acidification, we could see Antarctic phytoplanktons smaller and less effective at storing carbon before the end of the century.

== Monitoring ==
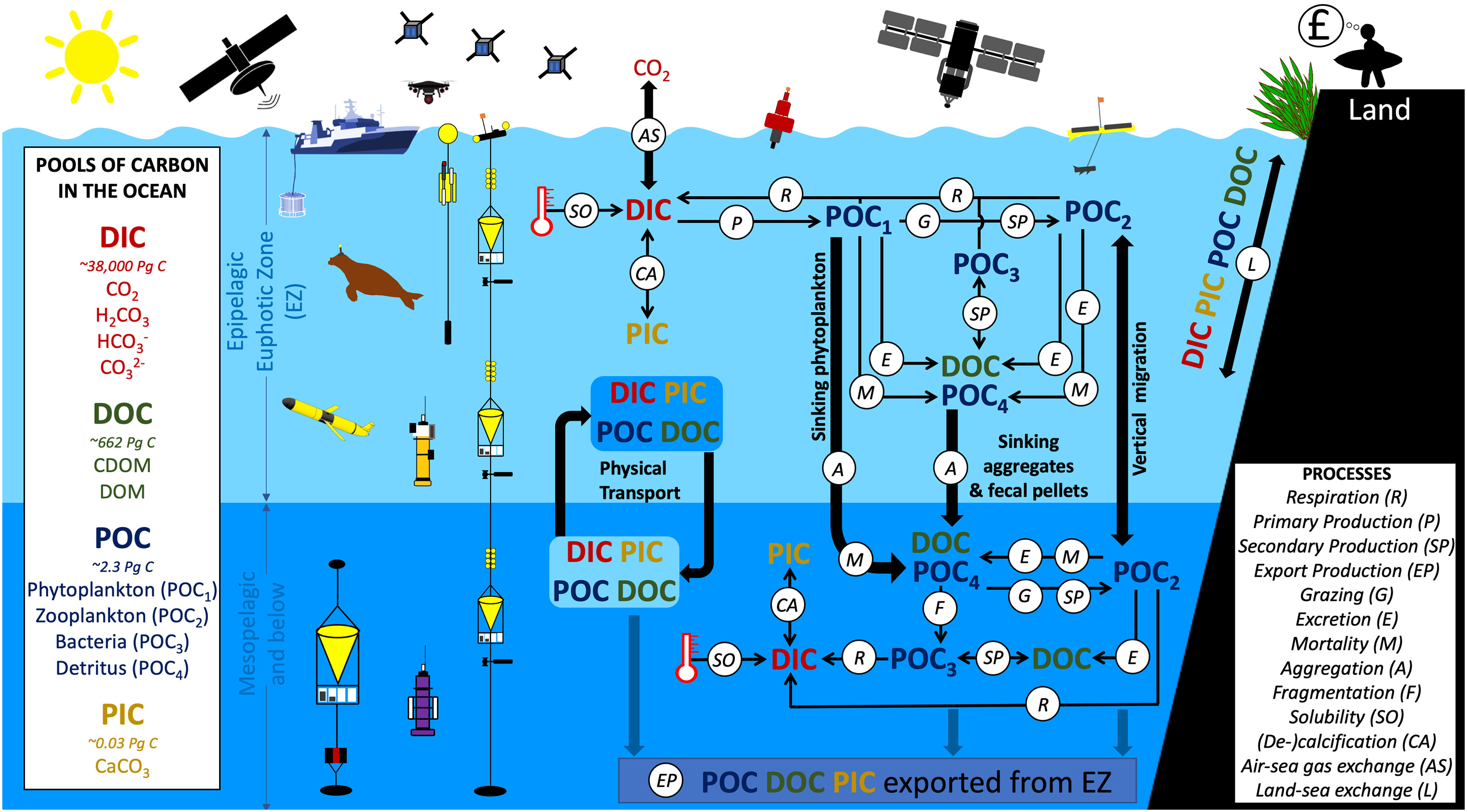
Monitoring the ocean biological carbon pump Pools, fluxes and processes that form the ocean biological carbon pump, and current methods used to monitor them. Bold black text and thick black arrows represent the key export pathways and interactions with other domains (land and atmosphere). Global stocks of the different carbon pools in the ocean are given in the box on the left; the four major kinds of pools – DIC, DOC, POC and PIC – are given in different colours. This figure has been inspired by, and builds on, two earlier figures, one from the CEOS carbon from space report and the other from the NASA EXPORTS plan.

Monitoring the biological pump is critical to understanding how the Earth's carbon cycle is changing. A variety of techniques are used to monitor the biological pump, which can be deployed from various platforms such as ships, autonomous vehicles, and satellites. At present, satellite remote sensing is the only tool available for viewing the entire surface ocean at high temporal and spatial scales.

== Needed research ==
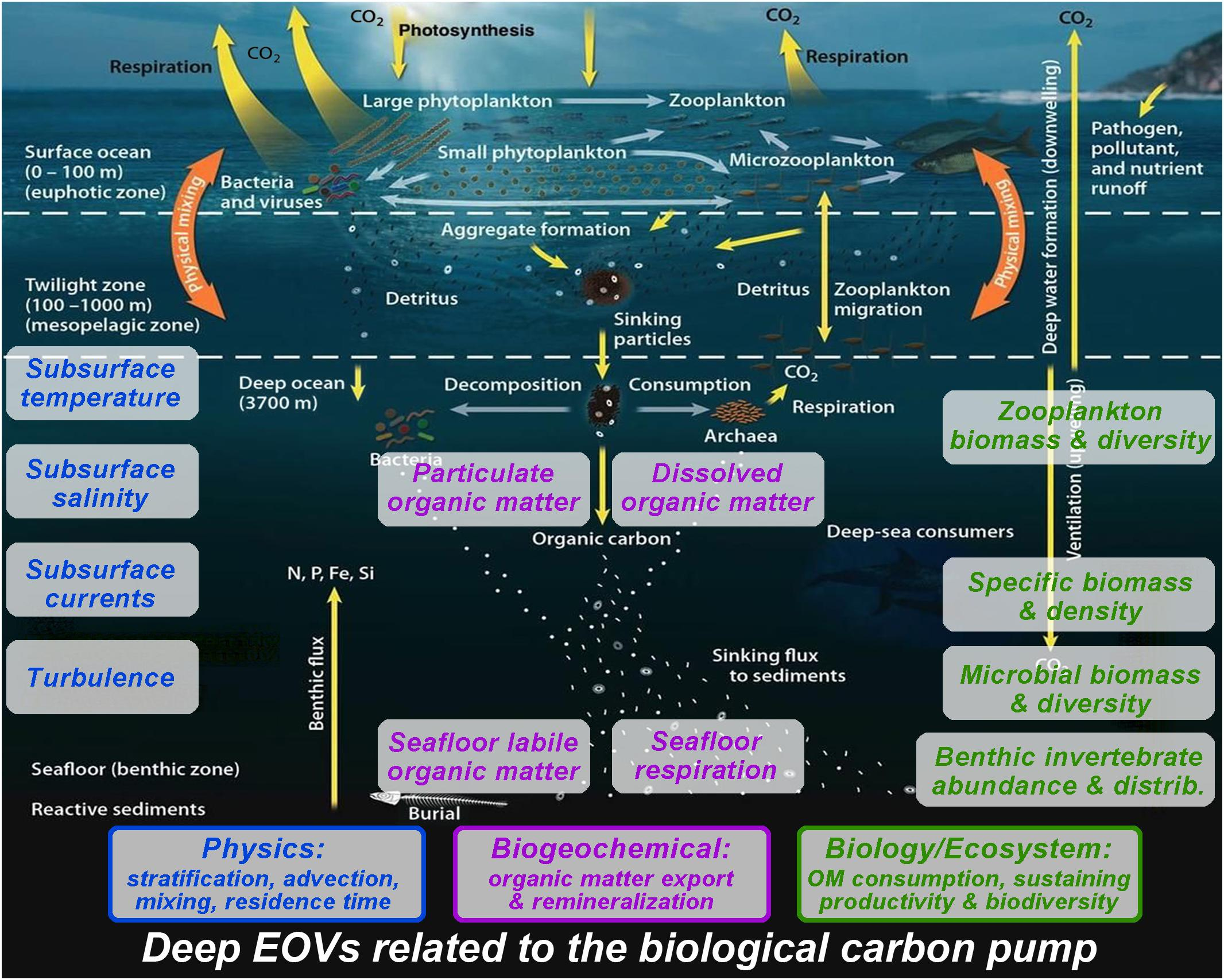
Multidisciplinary observations still needed in the deep water column to properly understand the biological pump EOVs = Essential Ocean Variables

Multidisciplinary observations are still needed in the deep water column to properly understand the biological pump:

- Physics: stratification affects particle sinking; understanding the origin of the particles and the residence time of the DIC from particle remineralization in the deep ocean requires measurement of advection and mixing.
- Biogeochemistry: export/mixing down of particulate and dissolved organic matter from the surface layer determines labile organic matter arriving at the seafloor, which is either respired by seafloor biota or stored for longer times in the sediment.
- Biology and ecosystems: zooplankton and microorganisms break down and remineralize sinking particles in the water column. Exported organic matter feeds all water column and benthic biota (zooplankton, benthic invertebrates, microbes) sustaining their biomass, density, and biodiversity.

== See also ==
- f-ratio (oceanography)
- Lysocline
- Mooring (oceanography)
- Apparent oxygen utilisation
