= Fenchel's Law =

Regularity in population ecology

Fenchel's Law is a regularity in population ecology regarding how exponential population growth is related to the body size of the organism. It was first described by the Danish marine ecologist Tom Fenchel. It contends that species with larger body sizes tend to have lower rates of population growth. More exactly, it states that the maximum rate of reproduction decreases with body size at a power of a quarter of the body mass

Fenchel's law may be expressed as an allometric equation:

$$r = {aW^{-0.25}}$$,

where r is the intrinsic rate of natural population growth, a is a constant that has 3 different values (one for unicellular organisms, one for poikilotherms and one for homeotherms), and W is the average body mass of the organism. This means that if a species A has a body mass 10 times that of species B, then the maximum population growth rate of A will be one-half that of species B.
