= Tom Fenchel =

Danish marine biologist (born 1940)

Tom Fenchel FRS
- Born: 19 March 1940 (age 86); Copenhagen, Denmark
- Occupation: Marine biologist
- Awards: ECI Prize; A.C. Redfield Lifetime Achievement Award
- Scientific career
- Known for: Fenchel's Law; Microbial loop
- Thesis: The ecology of marine microbenthos IV : structure and function of the benthic ecosystem, its chemical and physical factors and the microfauna communities with special reference to the ciliated protozoa (1969)

Tom Michael Fenchel (born 19 March 1940, in Copenhagen) is a Danish marine ecologist and professor first at the University of Aarhus, later at the University of Copenhagen. He is a highly cited scientist and known for, among other things, Fenchel's Law.

== Education ==
Fenchel holds PhD (1964) and Doctor of Science (1969) degrees, both from the University of Copenhagen.

== Awards and honours ==
He is a foreign member of the Royal Society and a reviewing editor of the scientific journal Science. He was the 1986 recipient of the ECI Prize of ecology and wrote the book in the ECI Prize laureate series Excellence in Ecology. He served as president 2004-2008 of the Royal Danish Academy of Sciences and Letters (he has been a member since 1976). In 2006 he was awarded the A.C. Redfield Lifetime Achievement Award by the American Society of Limnology and Oceanography.

He is a member of the Norwegian Academy of Science and Letters and of the American National Academy of Sciences
