= Carbon sink =

Reservoir absorbing more carbon from, than emitting to, the air

Carbon sinks (green bars on the right) remove carbon from the atmosphere, whereas carbon sources (greenhouse gas emissions) (grey bars on the left) add them. Since the 1850s, there are more carbon sources than sinks and therefore the carbon dioxide in Earth's atmosphere is rising.

A carbon sink is a natural or artificial carbon sequestration process that "removes a greenhouse gas, an aerosol or a precursor of a greenhouse gas from the atmosphere". These sinks form an important part of the natural carbon cycle. An overarching term is carbon pool, which is all the places where carbon on Earth can be, i.e. the atmosphere, oceans, soil, florae, fossil fuel reservoirs and so forth. A carbon sink is a type of carbon pool that has the capability to take up more carbon from the atmosphere than it releases.

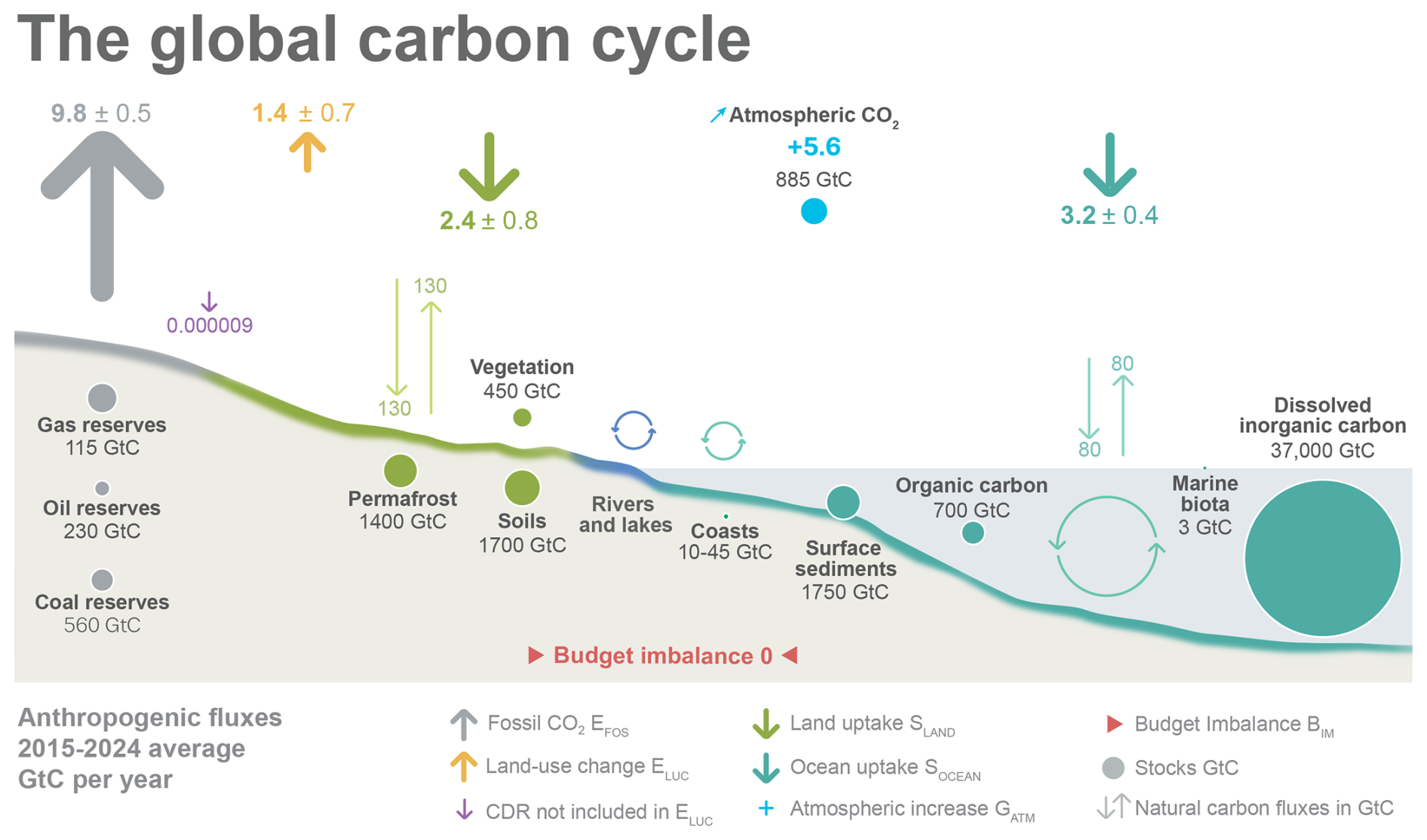
Overall perturbation of the global carbon cycle caused by anthropogenic activities, averaged globally for the decade 2015–2024

Globally, the two most important carbon sinks are vegetation and the ocean. Soil is an important carbon storage medium. Much of the organic carbon retained in the soil of agricultural areas has been depleted due to intensive farming. Blue carbon designates carbon that is fixed via certain marine ecosystems. Coastal blue carbon includes mangroves, salt marshes and seagrasses. These make up a majority of ocean plant life and store large quantities of carbon. Deep blue carbon is located in international waters and includes carbon contained in "continental shelf waters, deep-sea waters and the sea floor beneath them".

For climate change mitigation purposes, the maintenance and enhancement of natural carbon sinks, mainly soils and forests, is important. In the past, human practices like deforestation and industrial agriculture have depleted natural carbon sinks. This kind of land use change has been one of the causes of climate change.

== Definition ==
In the context of climate change and in particular mitigation, a sink is defined as "Any process, activity or mechanism which removes a greenhouse gas, an aerosol or a precursor of a greenhouse gas from the atmosphere".

In the case of non-CO_{2} greenhouse gases, sinks need not store the gas. Instead they can break it down into substances that have a reduced effect on global warming. For example, nitrous oxide can be reduced to harmless N_{2}.

Related terms are "carbon pool, reservoir, sequestration, source and uptake". The same publication defines carbon pool as "a reservoir in the Earth system where elements, such as carbon [...], reside in various chemical forms for a period of time."

Both carbon pools and carbon sinks are important concepts in understanding the carbon cycle, but they refer to slightly different things. A carbon pool can be thought of as the overarching term, and carbon sink is then a particular type of carbon pool: A carbon pool is all the places where carbon can be stored (for example the atmosphere, oceans, soil, plants, and fossil fuels).

== Types ==
The amount of carbon dioxide varies naturally in a dynamic equilibrium with photosynthesis of land plants. The natural carbon sinks are:

- Soil is a carbon store and active carbon sink.
- Photosynthesis by terrestrial plants with grass and trees allows them to serve as carbon sinks during growing seasons.
- Absorption of carbon dioxide by the oceans via solubility and biological pumps.

Artificial carbon sinks are those that store carbon in building materials or deep underground (geologic carbon sequestration). No major artificial systems remove carbon from the atmosphere on a large scale yet.

Public awareness of the significance of CO_{2} sinks has grown since passage of the 1997 Kyoto Protocol, which promotes their use as a form of carbon offset.

== Natural carbon sinks ==
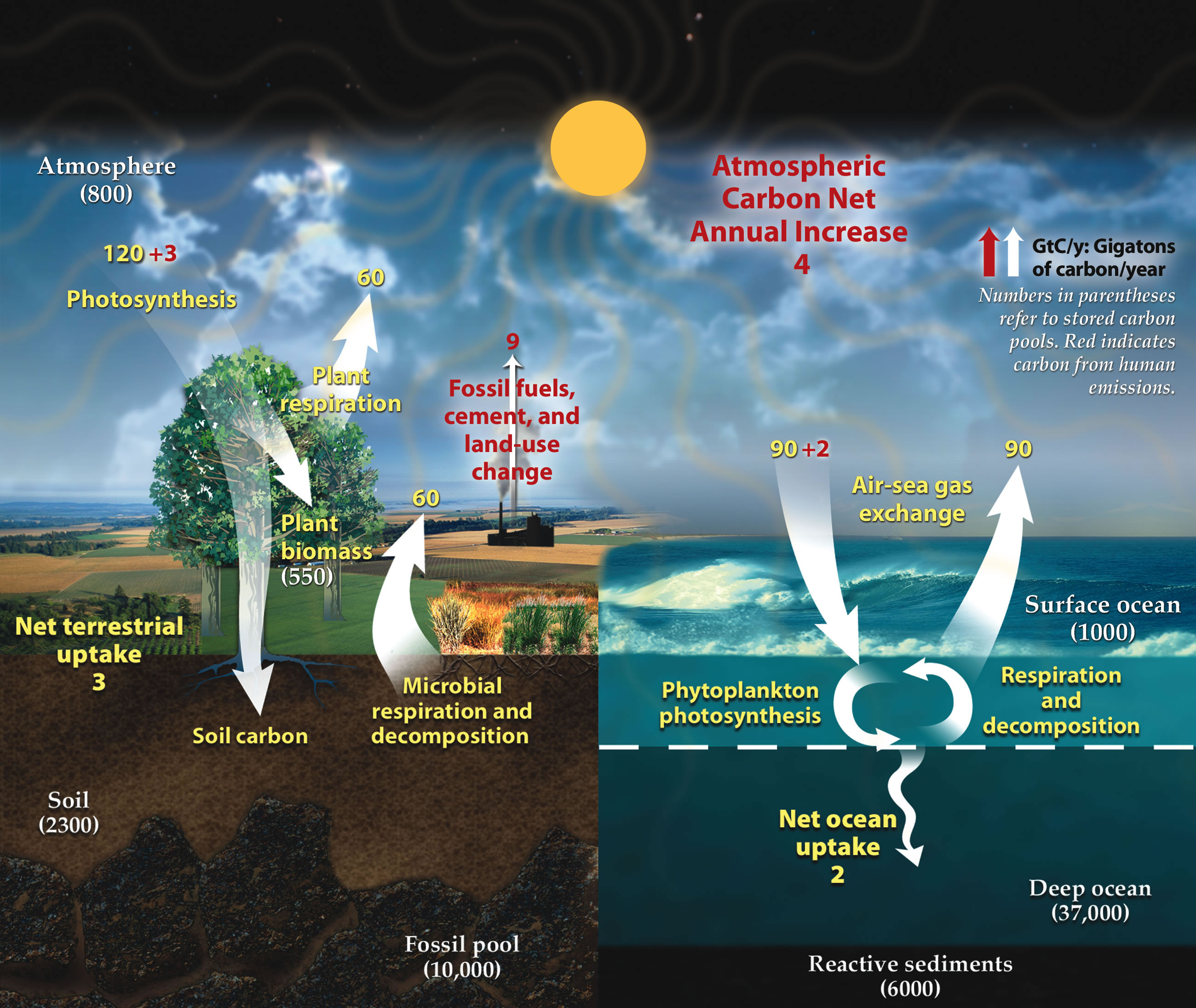
This diagram of the fast carbon cycle shows the movement of carbon between land, atmosphere, soil and oceans in billions of tons of carbon per year. Yellow numbers are natural fluxes, red are human contributions in billions of tons of carbon per year. White numbers indicate stored carbon.

=== Soils ===
Soils represent a short to long-term carbon storage medium and contain more carbon than all terrestrial vegetation and the atmosphere combined. Plant litter and other biomass including charcoal accumulates as organic matter in soils, and is degraded by chemical weathering and biological degradation. More recalcitrant organic carbon polymers such as cellulose, hemi-cellulose, lignin, aliphatic compounds, waxes and terpenoids are collectively retained as humus.

Organic matter tends to accumulate in litter and soils of colder regions such as the boreal forests of North America and the Taiga of Russia. Leaf litter and humus are rapidly oxidized and poorly retained in sub-tropical and tropical climate conditions due to high temperatures and extensive leaching by rainfall. Areas, where shifting cultivation or slash and burn agriculture are practiced, are generally only fertile for two to three years before they are abandoned. These tropical jungles are similar to coral reefs in that they are highly efficient at conserving and circulating necessary nutrients, which explains their lushness in a nutrient desert.

Grasslands contribute to soil organic matter, stored mainly in their extensive fibrous root mats. Due in part to the climatic conditions of these regions (e.g., cooler temperatures and semi-arid to arid conditions), these soils can accumulate significant quantities of organic matter. This can vary based on rainfall, the length of the winter season, and the frequency of naturally occurring lightning-induced grass-fires. While these fires release carbon dioxide, they improve the quality of the grasslands overall, in turn increasing the amount of carbon retained in the humic material. They also deposit carbon directly into the soil in the form of biochar that does not significantly degrade back to carbon dioxide.

Much organic carbon retained in many agricultural areas worldwide has been severely depleted due to intensive farming practices. Since the 1850s, a large proportion of the world's grasslands have been tilled and converted to croplands, allowing the rapid oxidation of large quantities of soil organic carbon. Methods that significantly enhance carbon sequestration in soil are called carbon farming. They include for example no-till farming, residue mulching, cover cropping, and crop rotation.

=== Forests ===
Proportion of carbon stock in forest carbon pools, 2020

Total forest carbon stock, by carbon pool, 2025.

Forests are an important part of the global carbon cycle because trees and plants absorb carbon dioxide through photosynthesis. Therefore, they play an important role in climate change mitigation. By removing the greenhouse gas CO_{2} from the air, forests function as terrestrial carbon sinks, meaning they store large amounts of carbon in the form of biomass, encompassing roots, stems, branches, and leaves. By doing so, forests sequester approximately 25% of human carbon emissions annually, playing a critical role in Earth's climate. Throughout their lifespan, trees continue to sequester carbon, storing atmospheric CO_{2} long-term. Sustainable forest management, afforestation, reforestation are therefore important contributions to climate change mitigation.

An important consideration in such efforts is that forests can turn from sinks to carbon sources. In 2019 forests took up a third less carbon than they did in the 1990s, due to higher temperatures, droughts and deforestation. National-scale forest inventory data also shows trends from 1999 to 2020 that some forests were already approaching climate thresholds shifting them from carbon sinks to carbon sources. The typical tropical forest may become a carbon source by the 2060s.

Researchers have found that, in terms of environmental services, it is better to avoid deforestation than to allow for deforestation to subsequently reforest, as the latter leads to irreversible effects in terms of biodiversity loss and soil degradation. Furthermore, the probability that legacy carbon will be released from soil is higher in a younger boreal forest. In particular, boreal forests have been noted to support the growth of Armillaria (honey fungus), which is a root pathogen that breaks down compounds necessary for wood integrity, increasing the likelihood of carbon release. Global greenhouse gas emissions caused by damage to tropical rainforests may have been substantially underestimated until around 2019. Additionally, the effects of afforestation and reforestation will be farther in the future than keeping existing forests intact. It takes much longer − several decades − for the benefits for global warming to manifest to the same carbon sequestration benefits from mature trees in tropical forests and hence from limiting deforestation. Therefore, scientists consider "the protection and recovery of carbon-rich and long-lived ecosystems, especially natural forests" to be "the major climate solution".

The planting of trees on marginal crop and pasture lands helps to incorporate carbon from atmospheric CO_{2} into biomass. For this carbon sequestration process to succeed the carbon must not return to the atmosphere from biomass burning or rotting when the trees die. Several species of Ficus such as Ficus wakefieldii have been observed to sequester atmospheric CO_{2} as calcium oxalate in the presence of oxalotrophic bacteria and fungi, which catabolize the oxalate, which produces calcium carbonate. The calcium carbonate is precipitated throughout the tree, which also alkalinizes the surrounding soil. These species are current candidates for carbon sequestration in agroforestry. Another example for an oxalogene tree is Brosimum alicastrum. This Calcium-oxalate fixation process was first observed in the Iroko tree, which can sequester up to a ton of calcium carbonate in the soil over its lifespan. Also Cacti, such as the Saguaro, transfer carbon from the biological cycle to the geological cycle by forming the mineral calcium carbonate.

=== Deep ocean, tidal marshes, mangroves and seagrasses ===
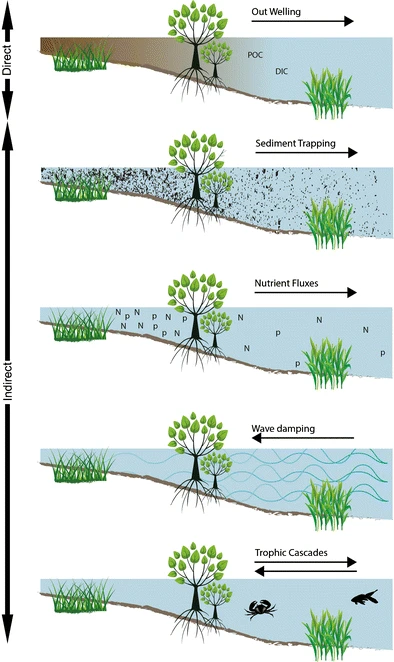
Ways one blue carbon habitat can influence the carbon concentration and future carbon sequestration in an adjacent blue carbon habitat

Blue carbon is a concept within climate change mitigation that refers to "biologically driven carbon fluxes and storage in marine systems that are amenable to management". Most commonly, it refers to the role that tidal marshes, mangroves and seagrass meadows can play in carbon sequestration. Whether macroalgae (seaweeds) can be considered blue carbon ecosystems remains contentious. These ecosystems can play an important role for climate change mitigation and ecosystem-based adaptation. However, when blue carbon ecosystems are degraded or lost, they release carbon back to the atmosphere, thereby adding to greenhouse gas emissions.

The methods for blue carbon management fall into the category of "ocean-based biological carbon dioxide removal (CDR) methods". They are a type of biological carbon fixation.

Scientists are looking for ways to further develop the blue carbon potential of ecosystems. However, the long-term effectiveness of blue carbon as a carbon dioxide removal solution is under debate.

The term deep blue carbon is also in use and refers to storing carbon in the deep ocean waters.

== Enhancing natural carbon sinks ==
=== Purpose in the context of climate change ===
About 58% of CO_{2} emissions have been absorbed by carbon sinks, including plant growth, soil uptake, and ocean uptake (2020 Global Carbon Budget).

An important mitigation measure is "preserving and enhancing carbon sinks". This refers to the management of Earth's natural carbon sinks in a way that preserves or increases their capability to remove CO_{2} from the atmosphere and to store it durably. Scientists call this process also carbon sequestration. In the context of climate change mitigation, the IPCC defines a sink as "Any process, activity or mechanism which removes a greenhouse gas, an aerosol or a precursor of a greenhouse gas from the atmosphere". Globally, the two most important carbon sinks are vegetation and the ocean.

To enhance the ability of ecosystems to sequester carbon, changes are necessary in agriculture and forestry. Examples are preventing deforestation and restoring natural ecosystems by reforestation. Scenarios that limit global warming to 1.5 °C typically project the large-scale use of carbon dioxide removal methods over the 21st century. There are concerns about over-reliance on these technologies, and their environmental impacts. But ecosystem restoration and reduced conversion are among the mitigation tools that can yield the most emissions reductions before 2030.

Land-based mitigation options are referred to as "AFOLU mitigation options" in the 2022 IPCC report on mitigation. The abbreviation stands for "agriculture, forestry and other land use" The report described the economic mitigation potential from relevant activities around forests and ecosystems as follows: "the conservation, improved management, and restoration of forests and other ecosystems (coastal wetlands, peatlands, savannas and grasslands)". A high mitigation potential is found for reducing deforestation in tropical regions. The economic potential of these activities has been estimated to be 4.2 to 7.4 gigatonnes of carbon dioxide equivalent (GtCO_{2} -eq) per year.

=== Carbon sequestration techniques in oceans ===
To enhance carbon sequestration processes in oceans the following technologies have been proposed but none have achieved large scale application so far: Seaweed farming, ocean fertilisation, artificial upwelling, basalt storage, mineralization and deep sea sediments, adding bases to neutralize acids. The idea of direct deep-sea carbon dioxide injection has been abandoned.

== Artificial carbon sinks ==
=== Wooden buildings ===
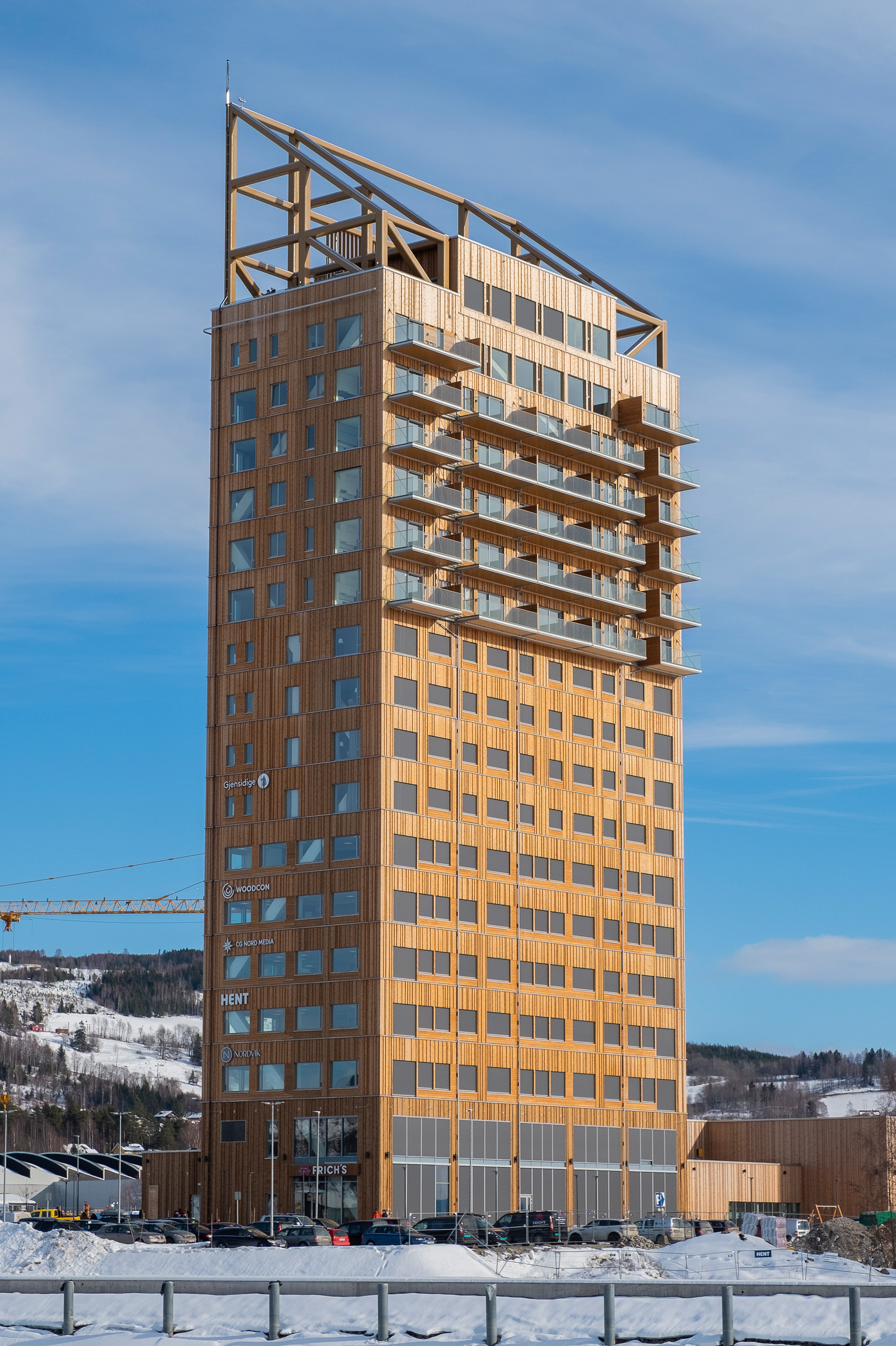
Mjøstårnet, one of the tallest timber buildings, at its opening 2019

Broad-base adoption of mass timber and their role in substituting steel and concrete in new mid-rise construction projects over the next few decades has the potential to turn timber buildings into carbon sinks, as they store the carbon dioxide taken up from the air by trees that are harvested and used as mass timber. This could result in storing between 10 million tons of carbon per year in the lowest scenario and close to 700 million tons in the highest scenario. For this to happen, the harvested forests would need to be sustainably managed and wood from demolished timber buildings would need to be reused or preserved on land in various forms.

Using rapidly renewable plant materials like bamboo, straw or hempcrete can further carbon sinks.

== See also ==
- Carbon budget
- Forest management
- Reforestation
