= Carbon sequestration =

Storing carbon in a carbon pool

Geologic and biologic carbon sequestration of excess carbon dioxide in the atmosphere emitted by human activities

Carbon sequestration is a natural process of storing carbon in a carbon pool. It plays a crucial role in effectively managing the global carbon cycle and limiting climate change by reducing the amount of carbon dioxide in the atmosphere. There are two main types of carbon sequestration: biologic (also called biosequestration) and geologic.

Biologic carbon sequestration is a naturally occurring process as part of the carbon cycle. Humans can enhance it through deliberate actions and use of technology. Carbon dioxide (CO_{2}) is naturally captured from the atmosphere through biological, chemical, and physical processes. These processes can be accelerated for example through changes in land use and agricultural practices, called carbon farming. Artificial processes have also been devised to produce similar effects. This approach is called carbon capture and storage. It involves using technology to capture and sequester (store) CO_{2} that is produced from human activities underground or under the sea bed.

Plants absorb carbon dioxide from the air as they grow, and bind it into biomass. However, biological stores (such as forests and kelp beds) may be temporary carbon sinks, as long-term sequestration cannot be guaranteed. Wildfires, disease, economic pressures, and changing political priorities may release the sequestered carbon back into the atmosphere.

Carbon dioxide that has been removed from the atmosphere can also be stored in the Earth's crust by injecting it underground, or in the form of insoluble carbonate salts. The latter process is called mineral sequestration. These methods are considered non-volatile because they not only remove carbon dioxide from the atmosphere but also sequester it indefinitely. This means the carbon is "locked away" for thousands to millions of years.

To enhance carbon sequestration processes in oceans the following chemical or physical technologies have been proposed: ocean fertilization, artificial upwelling, basalt storage, mineralization, deep-sea sediments, and adding bases to neutralize acids. However, none have achieved large scale application so far. Large-scale seaweed farming on the other hand is a biological process and could sequester significant amounts of carbon. The potential growth of seaweed for carbon farming would see the harvested seaweed transported to the deep ocean for long-term burial. The IPCC Special Report on the Ocean and Cryosphere in a Changing Climate recommends "further research attention" on seaweed farming as a mitigation tactic.

== Terminology ==
The term carbon sequestration has diverse meanings in the literature and media. The IPCC Sixth Assessment Report defines carbon sequestration as "The process of storing carbon in a carbon pool". Subsequently, a pool is defined as "a reservoir in the Earth system where elements, such as carbon and nitrogen, reside in various chemical forms for a period of time".

The United States Geological Survey (USGS) defines carbon sequestration as follows: "Carbon sequestration is the process of capturing and storing atmospheric carbon dioxide." Because the wording in this definition makes it very similar to the definition of carbon capture and storage (CCS), carbon sequestration is sometimes confounded with CCS (the IPCC defines CCS as "a process in which a relatively pure stream of carbon dioxide (CO_{2}) from industrial sources is separated, treated and transported to a long-term storage location").

== Roles ==
=== In nature ===
Carbon sequestration is part of the natural carbon cycle by which carbon is exchanged among the biosphere, pedosphere (soil), geosphere, hydrosphere, and atmosphere of Earth. Carbon dioxide is naturally captured from the atmosphere through biological, chemical, or physical processes, and stored in long-term reservoirs.

Plants absorb carbon dioxide from the air as they grow, and bind it into biomass. However, biological stores (such as forests and kelp beds) are considered volatile carbon sinks as long-term sequestration cannot be guaranteed. Events such as wildfires or disease, economic pressures, and changing political priorities can result in the sequestered carbon being released back into the atmosphere.

=== In climate change mitigation and policies ===
Carbon sequestration, which acts as a carbon sink, helps to mitigate climate change and thus reduce harmful effects of climate change. It helps to slow the atmospheric and marine accumulation of greenhouse gases, which is mainly carbon dioxide released by burning fossil fuels.

Carbon sequestration for climate change mitigation can involve either enhancing natural carbon sinks or employing technological methods to capture and store carbon.

Within the carbon capture and storage approaches, carbon sequestration refers to the storage component. Artificial carbon storage technologies can be applied, such as gaseous storage in deep geological formations (including saline formations and exhausted gas fields), and solid storage by reaction of CO_{2} with metal oxides to produce stable carbonates.

For carbon to be sequestered artificially—that is, outside the natural processes of the carbon cycle—it must first be captured, or its release into the atmosphere must be significantly delayed or prevented. This can be achieved by incorporating carbon-rich materials into long-lasting applications, such as construction, thereby avoiding release through processes like combustion or decay. Thereafter it can be passively stored or remain productively utilized over time in a variety of ways. For instance, upon harvesting, wood (as a carbon-rich material) can be incorporated into construction or a range of other durable products, thus sequestering its carbon over years or even centuries. In industrial production, engineers typically capture carbon dioxide from emissions from power plants or factories.

For example, in the United States, the Executive Order 13990 (officially titled "Protecting Public Health and the Environment and Restoring Science to Tackle the Climate Crisis") passed in 2021 and revoked January 2025, included several mentions of carbon sequestration via conservation and restoration of carbon sink ecosystems, such as wetlands and forests. The document emphasized the importance of farmers, landowners, and coastal communities in carbon sequestration. It directed the Treasury Department to promote conservation of carbon sinks through market based mechanisms.

Noting that the planet's carbon sequestration capacity is not unlimited, a 2025 study concluded that fully using Earth's geologic storage capacity would help limit global warming by only 0.7 °C (1.3 °F).

== Biological carbon sequestration on land ==
Biological carbon sequestration (also called biosequestration) is the capture and storage of the atmospheric greenhouse gas carbon dioxide by continual and enhanced biological processes. This form of carbon sequestration occurs through increased rates of photosynthesis via land-use practices such as reforestation and sustainable forest management. Land-use changes that enhance natural carbon capture have the potential to capture and store large amounts of carbon dioxide each year. These include the conservation, management, and restoration of ecosystems such as forests, peatlands, wetlands, and grasslands, in addition to carbon sequestration methods in agriculture. Methods and practices exist to enhance soil carbon sequestration in both agriculture and forestry.

=== Forestry ===
Proportion of carbon stock in forest carbon pools, 2020

Total forest carbon stock, by carbon pool, 2025.

Forests are an important part of the global carbon cycle because trees and plants absorb carbon dioxide through photosynthesis. Therefore, they play an important role in climate change mitigation. By removing the greenhouse gas CO_{2} from the air, forests function as terrestrial carbon sinks, meaning they store large amounts of carbon in the form of biomass, encompassing roots, stems, branches, and leaves. By doing so, forests sequester approximately 25% of human carbon emissions annually, playing a critical role in Earth's climate. Throughout their lifespan, trees continue to sequester carbon, storing atmospheric CO_{2} long-term. Sustainable forest management, afforestation, reforestation are therefore important contributions to climate change mitigation.

An important consideration in such efforts is that forests can turn from sinks to carbon sources. In 2019 forests took up a third less carbon than they did in the 1990s, due to higher temperatures, droughts and deforestation. National-scale forest inventory data also shows trends from 1999 to 2020 that some forests were already approaching climate thresholds shifting them from carbon sinks to carbon sources. The typical tropical forest may become a carbon source by the 2060s.

Researchers have found that, in terms of environmental services, it is better to avoid deforestation than to allow for deforestation to subsequently reforest, as the latter leads to irreversible effects in terms of biodiversity loss and soil degradation. Furthermore, the probability that legacy carbon will be released from soil is higher in a younger boreal forest. In particular, boreal forests have been noted to support the growth of Armillaria (honey fungus), which is a root pathogen that breaks down compounds necessary for wood integrity, increasing the likelihood of carbon release. Global greenhouse gas emissions caused by damage to tropical rainforests may have been substantially underestimated until around 2019. Additionally, the effects of afforestation and reforestation will be farther in the future than keeping existing forests intact. It takes much longer − several decades − for the benefits for global warming to manifest to the same carbon sequestration benefits from mature trees in tropical forests and hence from limiting deforestation. Therefore, scientists consider "the protection and recovery of carbon-rich and long-lived ecosystems, especially natural forests" to be "the major climate solution".

The planting of trees on marginal crop and pasture lands helps to incorporate carbon from atmospheric CO_{2} into biomass. For this carbon sequestration process to succeed the carbon must not return to the atmosphere from biomass burning or rotting when the trees die. Several species of Ficus such as Ficus wakefieldii have been observed to sequester atmospheric CO_{2} as calcium oxalate in the presence of oxalotrophic bacteria and fungi, which catabolize the oxalate, which produces calcium carbonate. The calcium carbonate is precipitated throughout the tree, which also alkalinizes the surrounding soil. These species are current candidates for carbon sequestration in agroforestry. Another example for an oxalogene tree is Brosimum alicastrum. This Calcium-oxalate fixation process was first observed in the Iroko tree, which can sequester up to a ton of calcium carbonate in the soil over its lifespan. Also Cacti, such as the Saguaro, transfer carbon from the biological cycle to the geological cycle by forming the mineral calcium carbonate.

Earth offers enough room to plant an additional 0.9 billion ha of tree canopy cover, although this estimate has been criticized, and the true area that has a net cooling effect on the climate when accounting for biophysical feedbacks like albedo is 20-80% lower. Planting and protecting these trees would sequester 205 billion tons of carbon if the trees survive future climate stress to reach maturity. To put this number into perspective, this is about 20 years of current global carbon emissions (as of 2019) . This level of sequestration would represent about 25% of the atmosphere's carbon pool in 2019.

Life expectancy of forests varies throughout the world, influenced by tree species, site conditions, and natural disturbance patterns. In some forests, carbon may be stored for centuries, while in other forests, carbon is released with frequent stand replacing fires. Forests that are harvested prior to stand replacing events allow for the retention of carbon in manufactured forest products such as lumber. However, only a portion of the carbon removed from logged forests ends up as durable goods and buildings. The remainder ends up as sawmill by-products such as pulp, paper, and pallets. If all new construction globally utilized 90% wood products, largely via adoption of mass timber in low rise construction, this could sequester 700 million net tons of carbon per year. This is in addition to the elimination of carbon emissions from the displaced construction material such as steel or concrete, which are carbon-intense to produce.

A meta-analysis found that mixed species plantations would increase carbon storage alongside other benefits of diversifying planted forests.

Although a bamboo forest stores less total carbon than a mature forest of trees, a bamboo plantation sequesters carbon at a much faster rate than a mature forest or a tree plantation. Therefore, the farming of bamboo timber may have significant carbon sequestration potential.

The Food and Agriculture Organization (FAO) reported that: "The total carbon stock in forests decreased from 668 gigatonnes in 1990 to 662 gigatonnes in 2020". In Canada's boreal forests as much as 80% of the total carbon is stored in the soils as dead organic matter.

The IPCC Sixth Assessment Report says: "Secondary forest regrowth and restoration of degraded forests and non-forest ecosystems can play a large role in carbon sequestration (high confidence) with high resilience to disturbances and additional benefits such as enhanced biodiversity."

Impacts on temperature are affected by the location of the forest. For example, reforestation in boreal or subarctic regions has less impact on climate. This is because it substitutes a high-albedo, snow-dominated region with a lower-albedo forest canopy. By contrast, tropical reforestation projects lead to a positive change such as the formation of clouds. These clouds then reflect the sunlight, lowering temperatures.

Planting trees in tropical climates with wet seasons has another advantage. In such a setting, trees grow more quickly (fixing more carbon) because they can grow year-round. Trees in tropical climates have, on average, larger, brighter, and more abundant leaves than non-tropical climates. A study of the girth of 70,000 trees across Africa has shown that tropical forests fix more carbon dioxide pollution than previously realized. The research suggested almost one-fifth of fossil fuel emissions are absorbed by forests across Africa, Amazonia and Asia. Simon Lewis stated, "Tropical forest trees are absorbing about 18% of the carbon dioxide added to the atmosphere each year from burning fossil fuels, substantially buffering the rate of change."

=== Wetlands ===
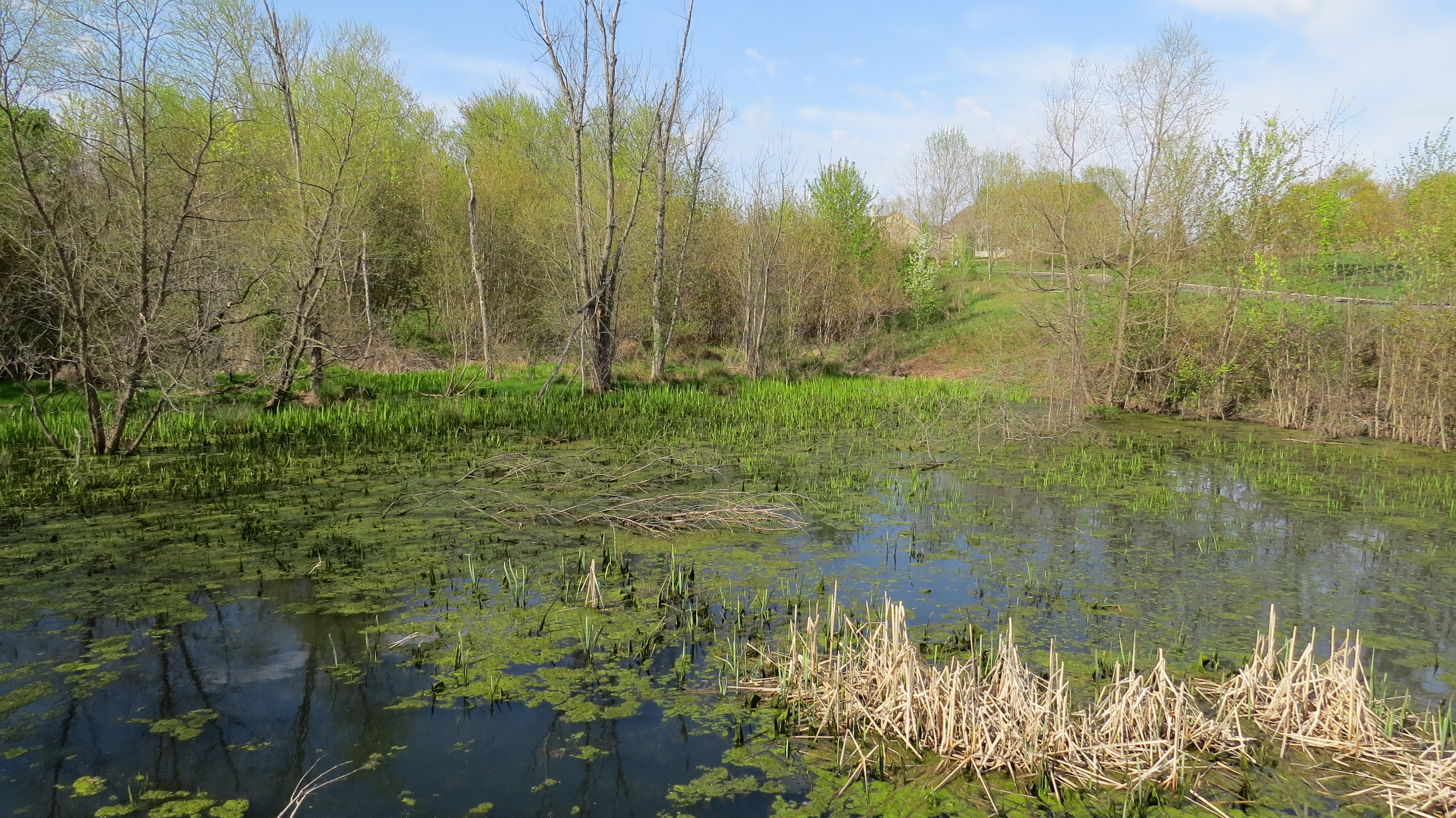
A healthy wetland ecosystem

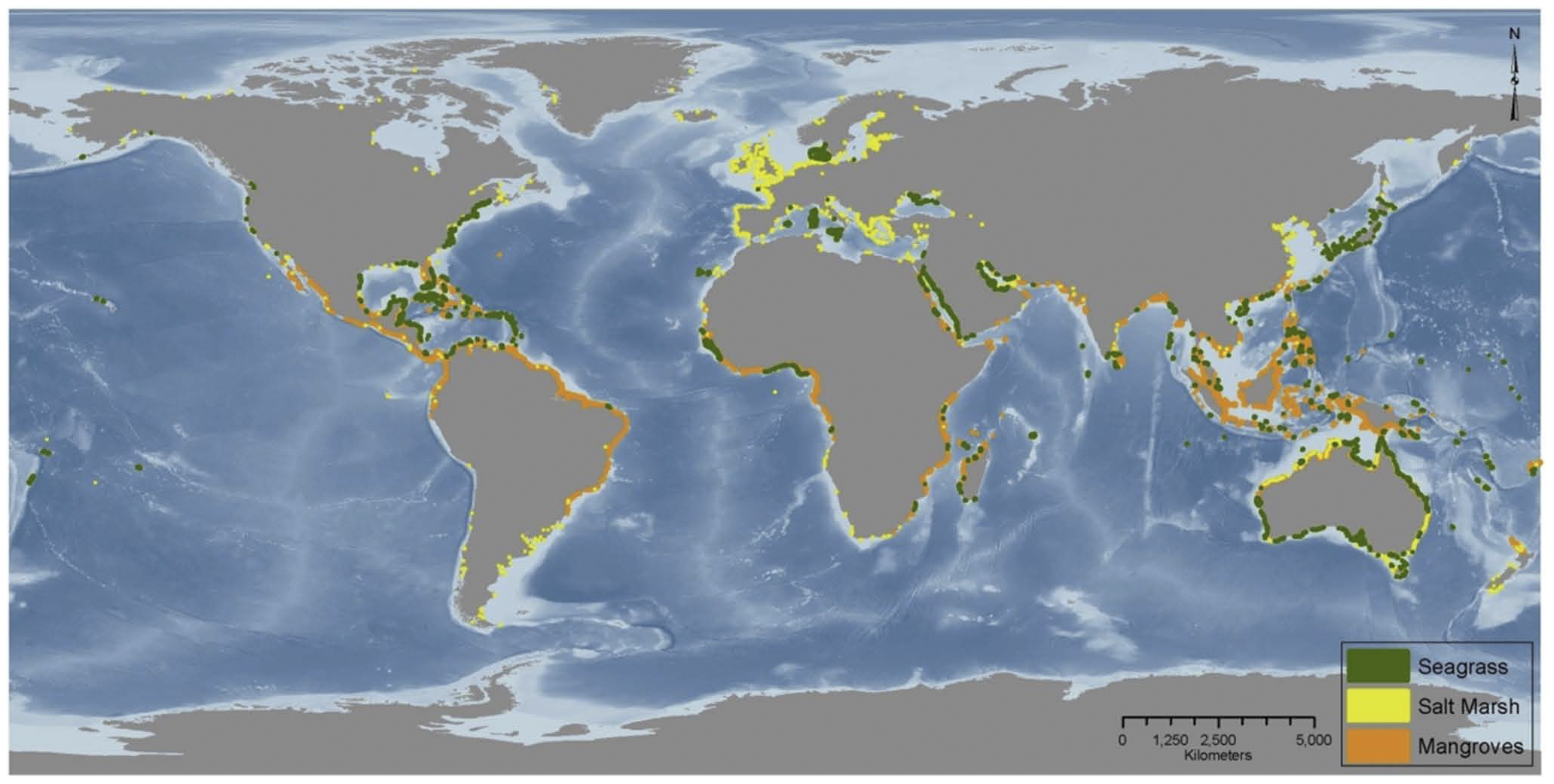
Global distribution of blue carbon (rooted vegetation in the coastal zone): tidal marshes, mangroves and seagrasses.

Wetland restoration involves restoring a wetland's natural biological, geological, and chemical functions through re-establishment or rehabilitation. It is a good way to reduce climate change. Wetland soil, particularly in coastal wetlands such as mangroves, sea grasses, and salt marshes, is an important carbon reservoir; 20–30% of the world's soil carbon is found in wetlands, while only 5–8% of the world's land is composed of wetlands. Studies have shown that restored wetlands can become productive CO_{2} sinks and many are being restored. Aside from climate benefits, wetland restoration and conservation can help preserve biodiversity, improve water quality, and aid with flood control.

The plants that make up wetlands absorb carbon dioxide (CO_{2}) from the atmosphere and convert it into organic matter. The waterlogged nature of the soil slows down the decomposition of organic material, resulting in the accumulation of carbon-rich sediments, that act as a long-term carbon sink. Additionally, anaerobic conditions in waterlogged soils hinder the complete breakdown of organic matter, promoting the conversion of carbon into more stable forms.

As with forests, for the sequestration process to succeed, the wetland must remain undisturbed. If it is disturbed the carbon stored in the plants and sediments will be released back into the atmosphere, and the ecosystem will no longer function as a carbon sink. Additionally, some wetlands can release non-CO_{2} greenhouse gases, such as methane and nitrous oxide which could offset potential climate benefits. The amounts of carbon sequestered via blue carbon by wetlands can also be difficult to measure.

Wetland soil is an important carbon sink; 14.5% of the world's soil carbon is found in wetlands, while only 5.5% of the world's land is composed of wetlands. Not only are wetlands a great carbon sink, they have many other benefits like collecting floodwater, filtering out air and water pollutants, and creating a home for numerous birds, fish, insects, and plants.

Climate change could alter wetland soil carbon storage, changing it from a sink to a source.With rising temperatures comes an increase in greenhouse gasses from wetlands especially locations with permafrost. When this permafrost melts it increases the available oxygen and water in the soil. Because of this, bacteria in the soil would create large amounts of carbon dioxide and methane to be released into the atmosphere.

The link between climate change and wetlands is still not fully known.It is also not clear how restored wetlands manage carbon while still being a contributing source of methane. However, preserving these areas would help prevent further release of carbon into the atmosphere.

==== Peatlands, mires and peat bogs ====
Despite occupying only 3% of the global land area, peatlands hold approximately 30% of the carbon in our ecosystem - twice the amount stored in the world's forests. Most peatlands are situated in high latitude areas of the northern hemisphere, with most of their growth occurring since the last ice age, but they are also found in tropical regions, such as the Amazon and Congo Basin.

Peatlands grow steadily over thousands of years, accumulating dead plant material – and the carbon contained within it – due to waterlogged conditions which greatly slow rates of decay. If peatlands are drained, for farmland or development, the plant material stored within them decomposes rapidly, releasing stored carbon. These degraded peatlands account for 5-10% of global carbon emissions from human activities. The loss of one peatland could potentially produce more carbon than 175–500 years of methane emissions.

Peatland protection and restoration are therefore important measures to mitigate carbon emissions, and also provide benefits for biodiversity, freshwater provision, and flood risk reduction.

=== Agriculture ===
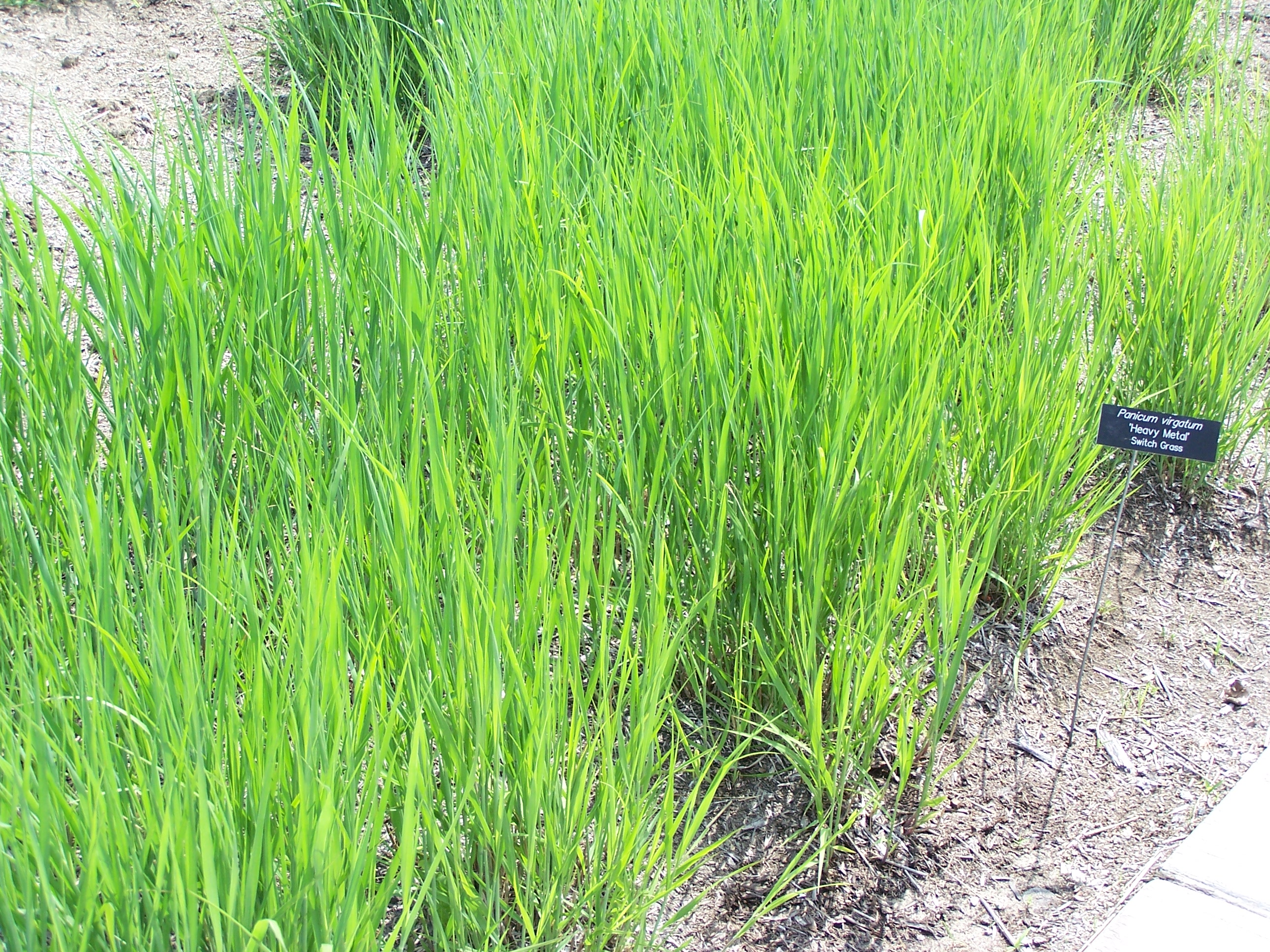
Panicum virgatum switchgrass, valuable in biofuel production, soil conservation, and carbon sequestration in soils

Compared to natural vegetation, cropland soils are depleted in soil organic carbon (SOC). When soil is converted from natural land or semi-natural land, such as forests, woodlands, grasslands, steppes, and savannas, the SOC content in the soil reduces by about 30–40%. This loss is due to harvesting, as plants contain carbon. When land use changes, the carbon in the soil will either increase or decrease, and this change will continue until the soil reaches a new equilibrium. Deviations from this equilibrium can also be affected by variated climate.

The decreasing of SOC content can be counteracted by increasing the carbon input. This can be done with several strategies, e.g. leave harvest residues on the field, use manure as fertilizer, or include perennial crops in the rotation. Perennial crops have a larger below-ground biomass fraction, which increases the SOC content.

Perennial crops reduce the need for tillage and thus help mitigate soil erosion, and may help increase soil organic matter. Globally, soils are estimated to contain >8,580 gigatons of organic carbon, about ten times the amount in the atmosphere and much more than in vegetation.

Researchers have found that rising temperatures can lead to population booms in soil microbes, converting stored carbon into carbon dioxide. In laboratory experiments heating soil, fungi-rich soils released less carbon dioxide than other soils.

Following carbon dioxide (CO2) absorption from the atmosphere, plants deposit organic matter into the soil. This organic matter, derived from decaying plant material and root systems, is rich in carbon compounds. Microorganisms in the soil break down this organic matter, and in the process, some of the carbon becomes further stabilized in the soil as humus - a process known as humification.

On a global basis, it is estimated that soil contains about 2,500 gigatons of carbon.This is greater than 3-fold the carbon found in the atmosphere and 4-fold of that found in living plants and animals. About 70% of the global soil organic carbon in non-permafrost areas is found in the deeper soil within the upper metre and is stabilized by mineral-organic associations.

==== Carbon farming ====
Carbon farming is a set of agricultural methods that aim to store carbon in the soil and biomass. The technical term for this is carbon sequestration. The overall goal of carbon farming is to create a net loss of carbon from the atmosphere. This is done by increasing the rate at which carbon is sequestered into soil and plant material. The increase of biomass from roots and the soil's microbiome leads to an increase in the organic matter content of the soil. Increasing organic matter content in soils aids plant growth, improves soil water retention capacity and reduces fertilizer use. Sustainable forest management is another tool that is used in carbon farming. Carbon farming is one component of climate-smart agriculture. It is also one way to remove carbon dioxide from the atmosphere.

Agricultural methods for carbon farming include adjusting how tillage and livestock grazing is done, using organic mulch or compost, working with biochar and terra preta, and changing the crop types. Methods used in forestry include reforestation and bamboo farming. As of 2016, variants of carbon farming reached hundreds of millions of hectares globally, of the nearly 5 billion hectares (1.2×10^{10} acres) of world farmland.

Carbon farming tends to be more expensive than conventional agricultural practices. Depending on the region, carbon farmings costs US$3-130 per tonne of carbon dioxide sequestered. Some countries provide subsidies to farmers to use carbon farming methods. While the implementation of carbon farming methods can reduce/sequester emissions, it is important to also consider the effects of land use changes with respect to the conversion of forests to agricultural production.

==== Prairies ====
Prairie restoration is a conservation effort to restore prairie lands that were destroyed due to industrial, agricultural, commercial, or residential development. The primary aim is to return areas and ecosystems to their previous state before their depletion. The mass of SOC able to be stored in these restored plots is typically greater than the previous crop, acting as a more effective carbon sink.

==== Biochar ====
Biochar is charcoal created by pyrolysis of biomass waste. The resulting material is added to a landfill or used as a soil improver to create terra preta. Adding biochar may increase the soil-C stock for the long term and so mitigate global warming by offsetting the atmospheric C (up to 9.5 Gigatons C annually). In the soil, the biochar carbon is unavailable for oxidation to CO_{2} and consequential atmospheric release. However concerns have been raised about biochar potentially accelerating release of the carbon already present in the soil.

Terra preta, an anthropogenic, high-carbon soil, is also being investigated as a sequestration mechanism. By pyrolysing biomass, about half of its carbon can be reduced to charcoal, which can persist in the soil for centuries, and makes a useful soil amendment, especially in tropical soils (biochar or agrichar).

=== Burial of biomass ===
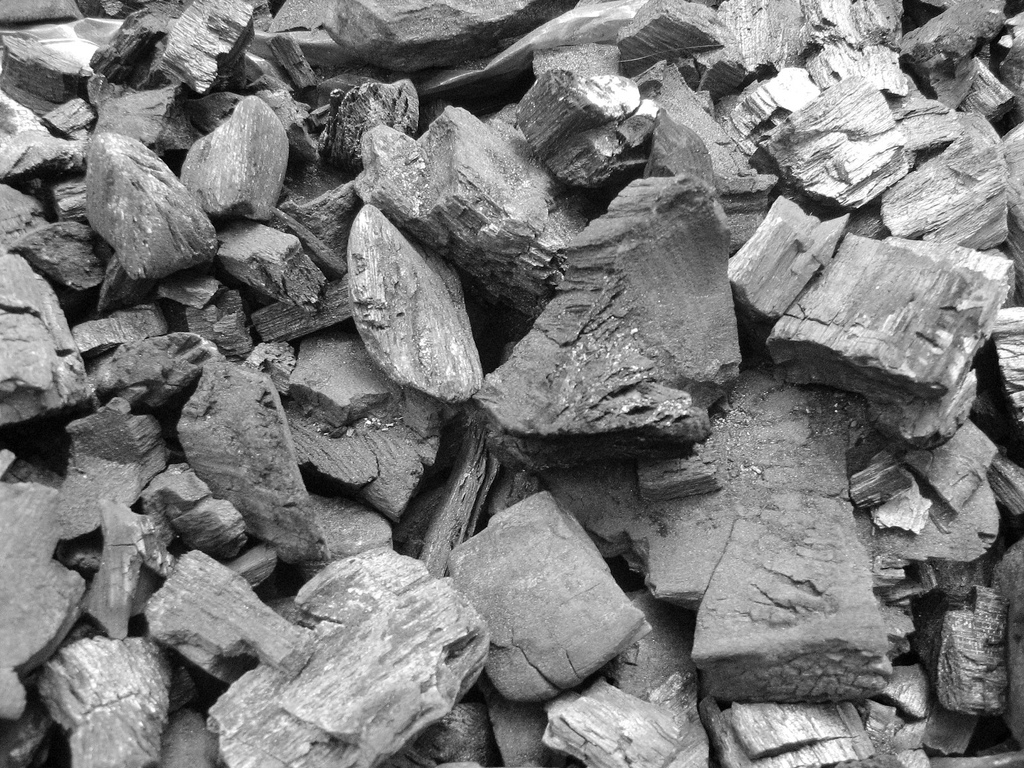
Biochar can be landfilled, used as a soil improver or burned using carbon capture and storage.

Burying biomass (such as trees) directly mimics the natural processes that created fossil fuels. The global potential for carbon sequestration using wood burial is estimated to be 10 ± 5 GtC/yr and largest rates in tropical forests (4.2 GtC/yr), followed by temperate (3.7 GtC/yr) and boreal forests (2.1 GtC/yr). In 2008, Ning Zeng of the University of Maryland estimated 65 GtC lying on the floor of the world's forests as coarse woody material which could be buried and costs for wood burial carbon sequestration run at US$50/tC which is much lower than carbon capture from e.g. power plant emissions. CO_{2} fixation into woody biomass is a natural process carried out through photosynthesis. This is a nature-based solution and methods being trialled include the use of "wood vaults" to store the wood-containing carbon under oxygen-free conditions.

In 2022, a certification organization published methodologies for biomass burial. Other biomass storage proposals have included the burial of biomass deep underwater, including at the bottom of the Black Sea.

== Geological carbon sequestration ==
=== Underground storage in suitable geologic formations ===
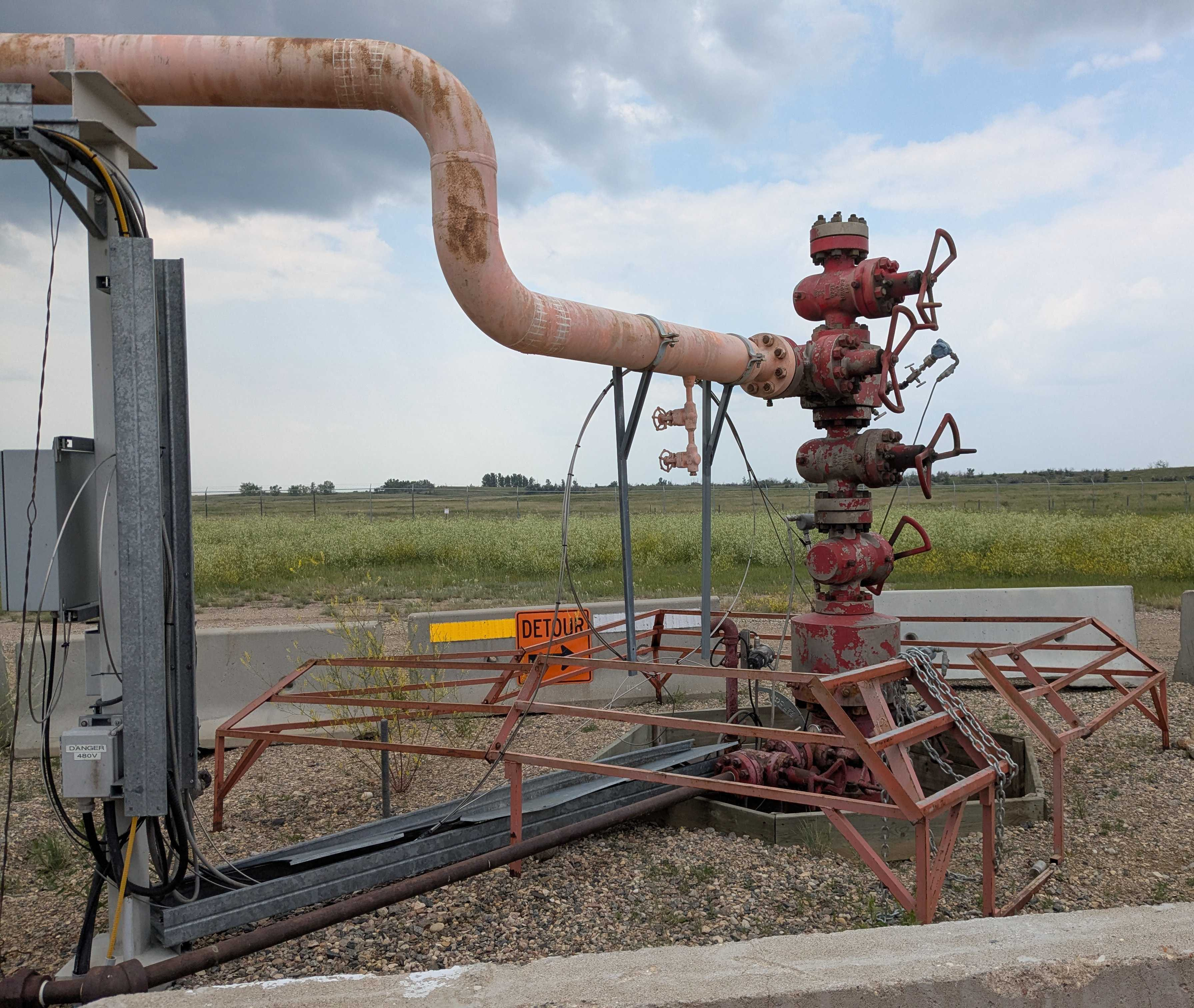
Wellhead near Estevan, SK, where CO_{2} is injected into a 3.4km deep saline aquifer

Geological sequestration refers to the storage of CO_{2} underground in depleted oil and gas reservoirs, saline formations, or deep, coal beds unsuitable for mining.

Once CO_{2} is captured from a point source, such as a cement factory, it can be compressed to ≈100 bar into a supercritical fluid. In this form, the CO_{2} could be transported via pipeline to the place of storage. The CO_{2} could then be injected deep underground, typically around 1 km (0.6 mi), where it would be stable for hundreds to millions of years. Under these storage conditions, the density of supercritical CO_{2} is 600 to 800 kg/m^{3}.

The important parameters in determining a good site for carbon storage are: rock porosity, rock permeability, absence of faults, and geometry of rock layers. The medium in which the CO_{2} is to be stored ideally has a high porosity and permeability, such as sandstone or limestone. Sandstone can have a permeability ranging from 1 to 10^{−5} Darcy, with a porosity as high as ≈30%. The porous rock must be capped by a layer of low permeability, which function as a seal, or caprock, for the CO_{2}. Shale is an example of a very good caprock, with a permeability of 10^{−5} to 10^{−9} Darcy. Once injected, the CO_{2} plume will rise via buoyant forces, since it is less dense than its surroundings. Once it encounters a caprock, it will spread laterally until it encounters a gap. If there are fault planes near the injection zone, there is a possibility the CO_{2} could migrate along the fault to the surface, leaking into the atmosphere, which would be potentially dangerous to life in the surrounding area. Another risk related to carbon sequestration is induced seismicity. If the injection of CO_{2} creates pressures underground that are too high, the formation will fracture, potentially causing an earthquake.

Structural trapping is considered the principal storage mechanism, impermeable or low permeability rocks such as mudstone, anhydrite, halite, or impermeable carbonates act as a barrier to the upward buoyant migration of CO_{2}, resulting in the retention of CO_{2} within a storage formation. While trapped in a rock formation, CO_{2} can be in the supercritical fluid phase or dissolve in groundwater/brine. It can also react with minerals in the geologic formation to become carbonates.

In 2025, research indicated that, of nearly 12,000 GtCO2 of theoretical carbon storage capacity, just 1,460 GtCO2 is risk-free, significantly less than most estimates suggested.

=== Mineral sequestration ===
Mineral sequestration aims to trap carbon in the form of solid carbonate salts. This process occurs slowly in nature and is responsible for the deposition and accumulation of limestone over geologic time. Carbonic acid in groundwater slowly reacts with complex silicates to dissolve calcium, magnesium, alkalis and silica and leave a residue of clay minerals. The dissolved calcium and magnesium react with bicarbonate to precipitate calcium and magnesium carbonates, a process that organisms use to make shells. When the organisms die, their shells are deposited as sediment and eventually turn into limestone. Limestones have accumulated over billions of years of geologic time and contain much of Earth's carbon. Ongoing research aims to speed up similar reactions involving alkali carbonates.

Zeolitic imidazolate frameworks (ZIFs) are metal–organic frameworks similar to zeolites. Because of their porosity, chemical stability and thermal resistance, ZIFs are being examined for their capacity to capture carbon dioxide.

==== Mineral carbonation ====
CO_{2} exothermically reacts with metal oxides, producing stable carbonates (e.g. calcite, magnesite). This process (CO_{2}-to-stone) occurs naturally over periods of years and is responsible for much surface limestone. Olivine is one such metal oxide. Rocks rich in metal oxides that react with CO_{2}, such as MgO and CaO as contained in basalts, have been proven as a viable means to achieve carbon-dioxide mineral storage. The reaction rate can in principle be accelerated with a catalyst or by increasing pressures, or by mineral pre-treatment, although this method can require additional energy.

Ultramafic mine tailings are a readily available source of fine-grained metal oxides that could serve this purpose. Accelerating passive CO_{2} sequestration via mineral carbonation may be achieved through microbial processes that enhance mineral dissolution and carbonate precipitation.

Carbon, in the form of CO_{2} can be removed from the atmosphere by chemical processes, and stored in stable carbonate mineral forms. This process (CO_{2}-to-stone) is known as "carbon sequestration by mineral carbonation" or mineral sequestration. The process involves reacting carbon dioxide with abundantly available metal oxides – either magnesium oxide (MgO) or calcium oxide (CaO) – to form stable carbonates. These reactions are exothermic and occur naturally (e.g., the weathering of rock over geologic time periods).

CaO + CO_{2} → CaCO_{3}

MgO + CO_{2} → MgCO_{3}

Calcium and magnesium are found in nature typically as calcium and magnesium silicates (such as forsterite and serpentinite) and not as binary oxides. For forsterite and serpentine the reactions are:

Mg_{2}SiO_{4} + 2 CO_{2} → 2 MgCO_{3} + SiO_{2}

Mg_{3}Si_{2}O_{5}(OH)_{4} + 3 CO_{2} → 3 MgCO_{3} + 2 SiO_{2} + 2 H_{2}O

These reactions are slightly more favorable at low temperatures. This process occurs naturally over geologic time frames and is responsible for much of the Earth's surface limestone. The reaction rate can be made faster however, by reacting at higher temperatures and/or pressures, although this method requires some additional energy. Alternatively, the mineral could be milled to increase its surface area, and exposed to water and constant abrasion to remove the inert silica as could be achieved naturally by dumping olivine in the high energy surf of beaches.

When CO_{2} is dissolved in water and injected into hot basaltic rocks underground it has been shown that the CO_{2} reacts with the basalt to form solid carbonate minerals. A test plant in Iceland started up in October 2017, extracting up to 50 tons of CO_{2} a year from the atmosphere and storing it underground in basaltic rock.

== Sequestration in oceans ==
Several start-ups are trying to do this at scale.

=== Marine carbon pumps ===
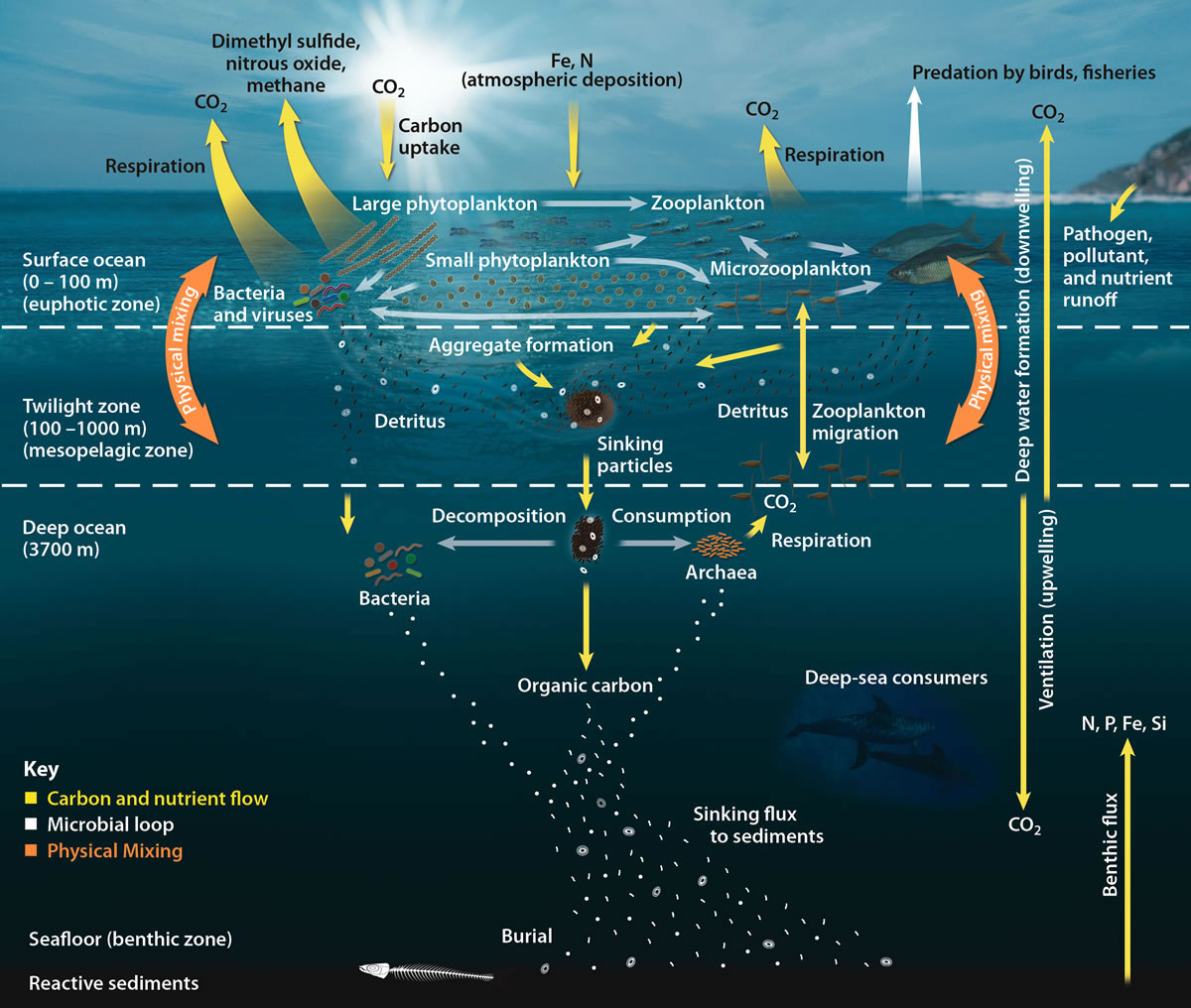
The pelagic food web, showing the central involvement of marine microorganisms in how the ocean imports carbon and then exports it back to the atmosphere and ocean floor

The ocean sequesters carbon through diverse processes. The solubility pump moves carbon dioxide from the atmosphere into the surface ocean where it reacts with water molecules to form carbonic acid. The solubility of carbon dioxide increases with decreasing water temperatures. Thermohaline circulation moves dissolved carbon dioxide to cooler waters where it is more soluble, increasing carbon concentrations in the ocean interior. The biological pump moves dissolved carbon dioxide from the surface ocean to the ocean's interior through the conversion of inorganic carbon to organic carbon by photosynthesis. Organic matter that survives respiration and remineralization can be transported through sinking particles and organism migration to the deep ocean.

The low temperatures, high pressure, and reduced oxygen levels in the deep sea slow down decomposition processes, preventing the rapid release of carbon back into the atmosphere and acting as a long-term storage reservoir.

=== Vegetated coastal ecosystems ===
Blue carbon is a concept within climate change mitigation that refers to "biologically driven carbon fluxes and storage in marine systems that are amenable to management". Most commonly, it refers to the role that tidal marshes, mangroves and seagrass meadows can play in carbon sequestration. Whether macroalgae (seaweeds) can be considered blue carbon ecosystems remains contentious. These ecosystems can play an important role for climate change mitigation and ecosystem-based adaptation. However, when blue carbon ecosystems are degraded or lost, they release carbon back to the atmosphere, thereby adding to greenhouse gas emissions.

=== Seaweed farming and algae ===
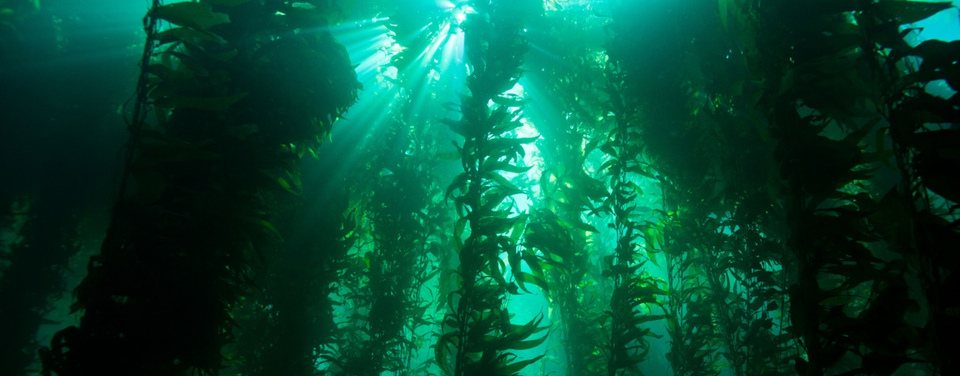
Kelp forest

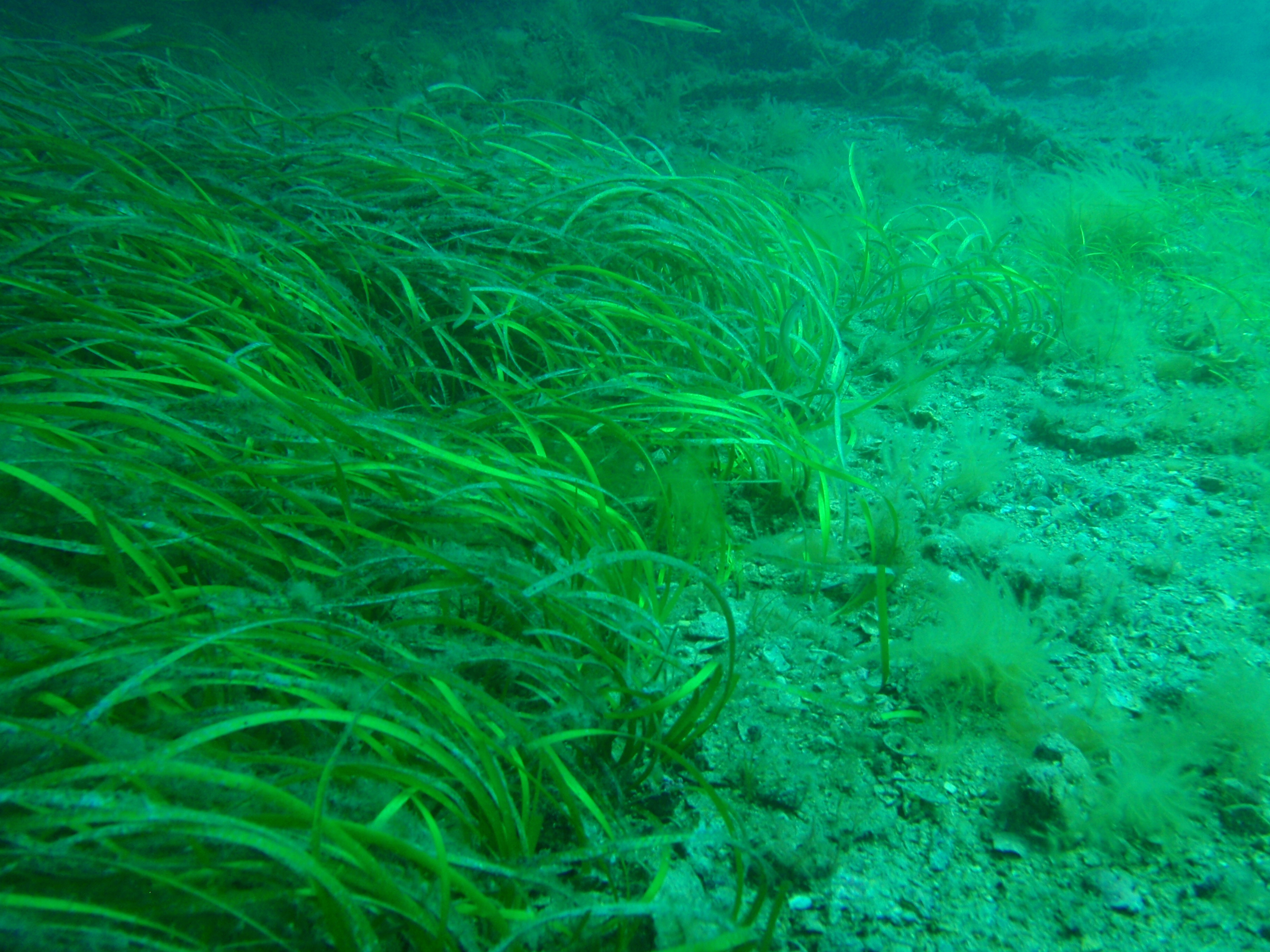
Seagrass meadow

Seaweed grows in shallow and coastal areas, and captures significant amounts of carbon that can be transported to the deep ocean by oceanic mechanisms; seaweed reaching the deep ocean sequester carbon and prevent it from exchanging with the atmosphere over millennia. Growing seaweed offshore with the purpose of sinking the seaweed in the depths of the sea to sequester carbon has been suggested. In addition, seaweed grows very fast and can theoretically be harvested and processed to generate biomethane, via anaerobic digestion to generate electricity, via cogeneration/CHP or as a replacement for natural gas. One study suggested that if seaweed farms covered 9% of the ocean they could produce enough biomethane to supply Earth's equivalent demand for fossil fuel energy, remove 53 gigatonnes of CO_{2} per year from the atmosphere and sustainably produce 200 kg per year of fish, per person, for 10 billion people.Ideal species for such farming and conversion include Laminaria digitata, Fucus serratus and Saccharina latissima.

Both macroalgae and microalgae are being investigated as possible means of carbon sequestration. Marine phytoplankton perform half of the global photosynthetic CO_{2} fixation (net global primary production of ~50 Pg C per year) and half of the oxygen production despite amounting to only ~1% of global plant biomass.

Because algae lack the complex lignin associated with terrestrial plants, the carbon in algae is released into the atmosphere more rapidly than carbon captured on land. Algae have been proposed as a short-term storage pool of carbon that can be used as a feedstock for the production of various biogenic fuels.

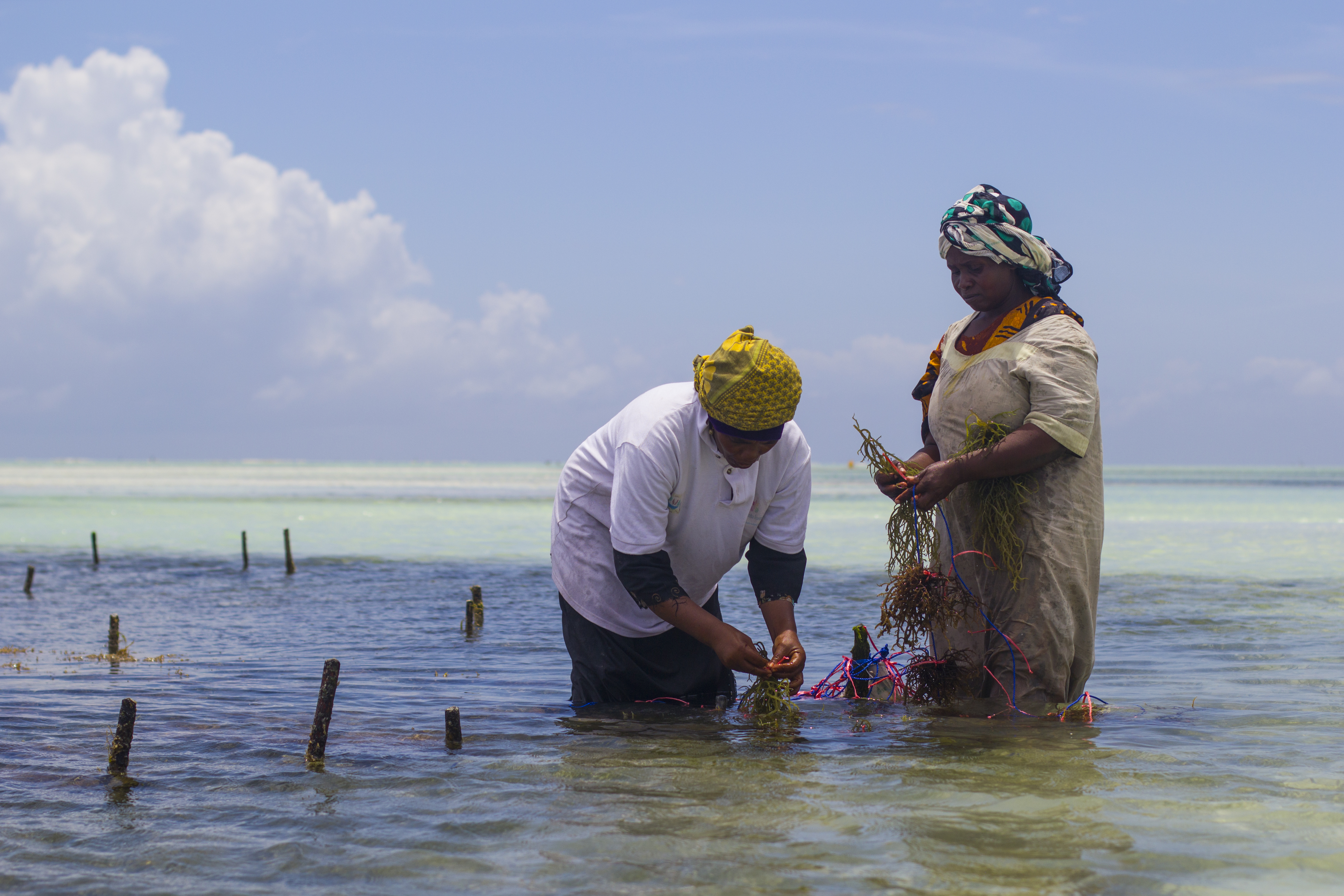
Women working with seaweed

Large-scale seaweed farming could sequester significant amounts of carbon. Wild seaweed will sequester large amount of carbon through dissolved particles of organic matter being transported to deep ocean seafloors where it will become buried and remain for long periods of time. With respect to carbon farming, the potential growth of seaweed for carbon farming would see the harvested seaweed transported to the deep ocean for long-term burial. Seaweed farming occurs mostly in the Asian Pacific coastal areas where it has been a rapidly increasing market. The IPCC Special Report on the Ocean and Cryosphere in a Changing Climate recommends "further research attention" on seaweed farming as a mitigation tactic.

=== Ocean fertilization ===
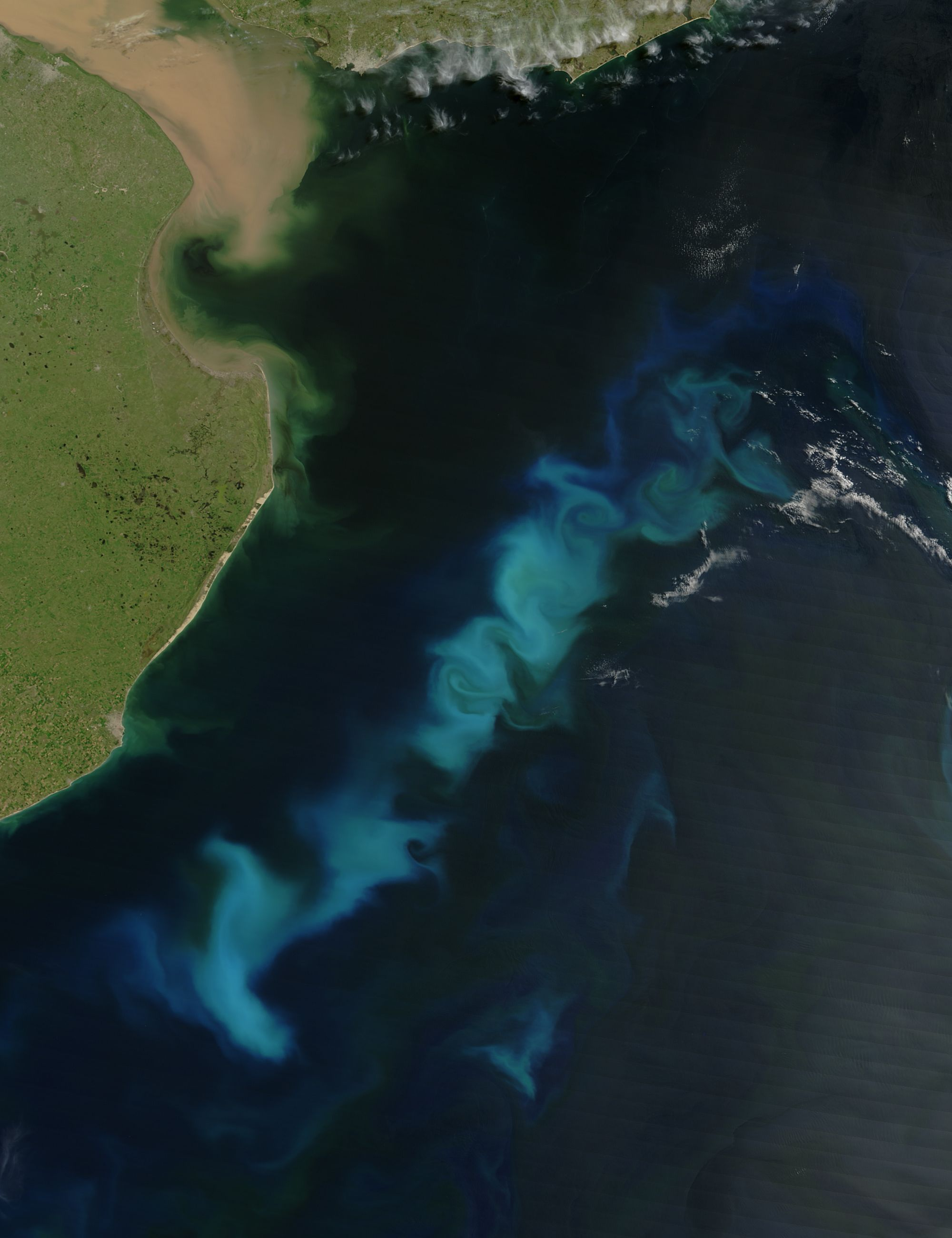
An oceanic phytoplankton bloom in the South Atlantic Ocean, off the coast of Argentina. Encouraging such blooms with iron fertilization could lock up carbon on the seabed. However, this approach is currently (2022) no longer being actively pursued.

Ocean fertilization or ocean nourishment refers to both natural and intentional processes that replenish iron and other nutrients in the upper ocean, which in turn stimulate the growth of phytoplankton and in some circumstances draw down large amounts of carbon dioxide (CO_{2}) through photosynthesis. Intentional ocean fertilization is biomimicry of natural processes that have removed atmospheric CO_{2} before ice ages as well as after volcanic eruptions, whale defecation, and near hydrothermal vents. The introduction of nutrients to the upper ocean increases marine food production as well as removing carbon dioxide from the atmosphere.

A number of techniques, including fertilization by the micronutrient iron (called "ocean iron fertilization" or OIF) or with nitrogen and phosphorus (both macronutrients), have been proposed. A NOAA special report rated OIF as having "a moderate potential for cost, scalability and how long carbon might be stored compared to other marine sequestration ideas."

Ocean iron fertilization can stimulate photosynthesis in phytoplankton. The phytoplankton converts the ocean's dissolved carbon dioxide into carbohydrate, some of which has been shown to sink into the deeper ocean. More than a dozen open-sea experiments confirmed that adding iron to the ocean increases photosynthesis in phytoplankton by up to 30 times.

=== Artificial upwelling ===
Artificial upwelling or downwelling is an approach that would change the mixing layers of the ocean. Encouraging various ocean layers to mix can move nutrients and dissolved gases around. Mixing may be achieved by placing large vertical pipes in the oceans to pump nutrient-rich water to the surface, triggering blooms of algae, which store carbon when they grow and export carbon when they die. This produces results somewhat similar to iron fertilization. One side-effect is a short-term rise in CO_{2}, which limits its attractiveness.

Mixing layers involve transporting the denser and colder deep ocean water to the surface mixed layer. As the ocean temperature decreases with depth, more carbon dioxide and other compounds are able to dissolve in the deeper layers. This can be induced by reversing the oceanic carbon cycle through the use of large vertical pipes serving as ocean pumps, or a mixer array. When the nutrient rich deep ocean water is moved to the surface, algae bloom occurs, resulting in a decrease in carbon dioxide due to carbon intake from phytoplankton and other photosynthetic eukaryotic organisms. The transfer of heat between the layers will also cause seawater from the mixed layer to sink and absorb more carbon dioxide. This method has not gained much traction as algae bloom harms marine ecosystems by blocking sunlight and releasing harmful toxins into the ocean. The sudden increase in carbon dioxide on the surface level will also temporarily decrease the pH of the seawater, impairing the growth of coral reefs. The production of carbonic acid through the dissolution of carbon dioxide in seawater hinders marine biogenic calcification and causes major disruptions to the oceanic food chain.

=== Basalt storage ===
Carbon dioxide sequestration in basalt involves the injecting of CO_{2} into deep-sea formations. The CO_{2} first mixes with seawater and then reacts with the basalt, both of which are alkaline-rich elements. This reaction results in the release of Ca^{2+} and Mg^{2+} ions forming stable carbonate minerals.

Underwater basalt offers a good alternative to other forms of oceanic carbon storage because it has a number of trapping measures to ensure added protection against leakage. These measures include "geochemical, sediment, gravitational and hydrate formation." Because CO_{2} hydrate is denser than CO_{2} in seawater, the risk of leakage is minimal. Injecting the CO_{2} at depths greater than 2,700 meters (8,900 ft) ensures that the CO_{2} has a greater density than seawater, causing it to sink.

One possible injection site is Juan de Fuca Plate. Researchers at the Lamont–Doherty Earth Observatory found that this plate at the western coast of the United States has a possible storage capacity of 208 gigatons. This could cover the entire current U.S. carbon emissions for over 100 years (as of 2009).

This process is undergoing tests as part of the CarbFix project, resulting in 95% of the injected 250 tonnes of CO_{2} to solidify into calcite in two years, using 25 tonnes of water per tonne of CO_{2}.

==== Mineralization and deep sea sediments ====
Similar to mineralization processes that take place within rocks, mineralization can also occur under the sea. The rate of dissolution of carbon dioxide from atmosphere to oceanic regions is determined by the circulation period of the ocean and buffering ability of subducting surface water. Researchers have demonstrated that the carbon dioxide marine storage at several kilometers depth could be viable for up to 500 years, but is dependent on injection site and conditions. Several studies have shown that although it may fix carbon dioxide effectively, carbon dioxide may be released back to the atmosphere over time. However, this is unlikely for at least a few more centuries. The neutralization of CaCO_{3}, or balancing the concentration of CaCO_{3} on the seafloor, land and in the ocean, can be measured on a timescale of thousands of years. More specifically, the predicted time is 1700 years for ocean and approximately 5000 to 6000 years for land. Further, the dissolution time for CaCO_{3} can be improved by injecting near or downstream of the storage site.

In addition to carbon mineralization, another proposal is deep sea sediment injection. It injects liquid carbon dioxide at least 3,000 m (9,800 ft) below the surface directly into ocean sediments to generate carbon dioxide hydrate. Two regions are defined for exploration: 1) the negative buoyancy zone (NBZ), which is the region between liquid carbon dioxide denser than surrounding water and where liquid carbon dioxide has neutral buoyancy, and 2) the hydrate formation zone (HFZ), which typically has low temperatures and high pressures. Several research models have shown that the optimal depth of injection requires consideration of intrinsic permeability and any changes in liquid carbon dioxide permeability for optimal storage. The formation of hydrates decreases liquid carbon dioxide permeability, and injection below HFZ is more energetically favored than within the HFZ. If the NBZ is a greater column of water than the HFZ, the injection should happen below the HFZ and directly to the NBZ. In this case, liquid carbon dioxide will sink to the NBZ and be stored below the buoyancy and hydrate cap. Carbon dioxide leakage can occur if there is dissolution into pore fluidor via molecular diffusion. However, this occurs over thousands of years.

=== Adding bases to neutralize acids ===
Carbon dioxide forms carbonic acid when dissolved in water, making ocean acidification a significant consequence of elevated CO_{2} levels. The acidification also limits the rate at which CO_{2} can be absorbed by the ocean (through the solubility pump). Various bases have been suggested that could neutralize the ocean acidity and thereby enhance CO_{2} absorption. For example, adding crushed limestone to oceans enhances the absorption of carbon dioxide. Another approach involves adding sodium hydroxide, produced through electrolysis of saltwater or brine. The resulting hydrochloric acid byproduct can be neutralized by reacting it with volcanic silicate rocks, such as enstatite—effectively accelerating the natural weathering process to help restore ocean pH.

==== Single-step carbon sequestration and storage ====
Single-step carbon sequestration and storage is a saline water-based mineralization technology extracting carbon dioxide from seawater and storing it in the form of solid minerals.

=== Abandoned ideas ===
==== Direct deep-sea carbon dioxide injection ====
It was once suggested that CO_{2} could be stored in the oceans by direct injection into the deep ocean and storing it there for some centuries. At the time, this proposal was called "ocean storage" but more precisely it was known as "direct deep-sea carbon dioxide injection". However, the interest in this avenue of carbon storage has much reduced since about 2001 because of concerns about the unknown impacts on marine life, high costs and concerns about its stability or permanence. The "IPCC Special Report on Carbon Dioxide Capture and Storage" in 2005 did include this technology as an option. However, the IPCC Fifth Assessment Report in 2014 no longer mentioned the term "ocean storage" in its report on climate change mitigation methods. The 2022 IPCC Sixth Assessment Report does not mention "ocean storage" in its "Carbon Dioxide Removal taxonomy".

== Costs ==
Cost of carbon sequestration (not including capture and transport) varies but is below US$10 per tonne in some cases where onshore storage is available. For example Carbfix cost is around US$25 per tonne of CO_{2}. A 2020 report estimated sequestration in forests (so including capture) at US$35 for small quantities to US$280 per tonne for 10% of the total required to keep to 1.5 C warming. But there is risk of forest fires releasing the carbon. Research indicates that offsetting the total carbon reserves of the 200 largest fossil fuel companies is estimated to cost between 11% and 701% of global GDP, depending on the market price of carbon.

== See also ==
- Carbon budget
- Mycorrhizal fungi and soil carbon storage
