= Trapping mechanisms for carbon geosequestration =

Underground methods for gas storage

Trapping mechanisms for carbon geosequestration prevent carbon dioxide stored in geological structures from leaking into the atmosphere. As a means to lower greenhouse gas emissions, carbon dioxide from carbon sequestration, especially in terms of carbon capture and storage, is able to be directed from power plants and other sources of greenhouse gas emissions, with carbon dioxide emissions being pumped into subterranean storage facilities. However, there is still the risk of the carbon dioxide leaking from the underground storage facilities. To address this, several trapping mechanisms have been proposed and researched.

== Structural trapping ==
This is most likely the main solution for preventing leaks. Impermeable (or low permeability) rocks such as caprock or similar material block the gas flow. Mudrocks, anhydrite, halite, or tight carbonates are materials that can act as a barrier to the upward buoyant migration of carbon dioxide.

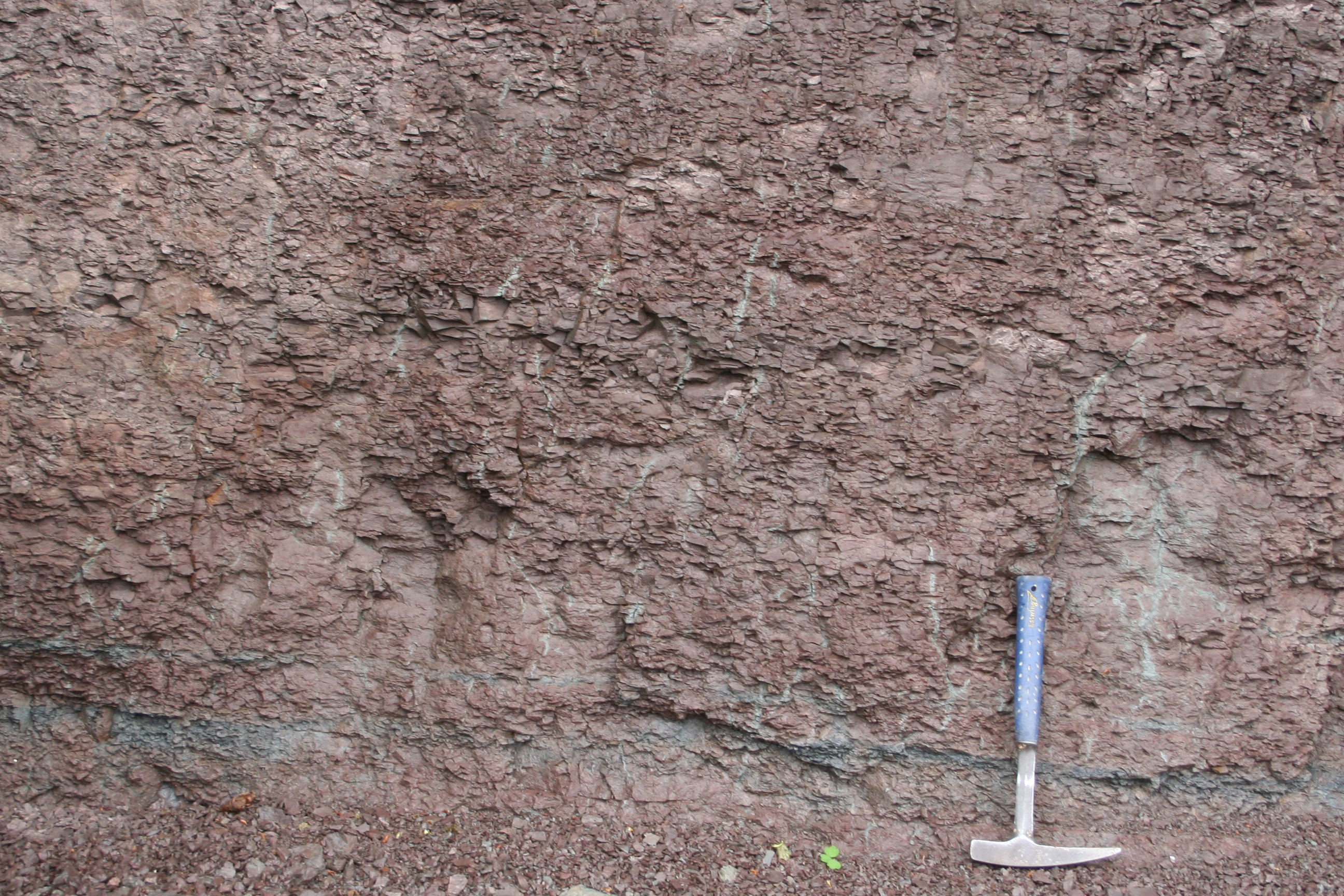
Mudrock

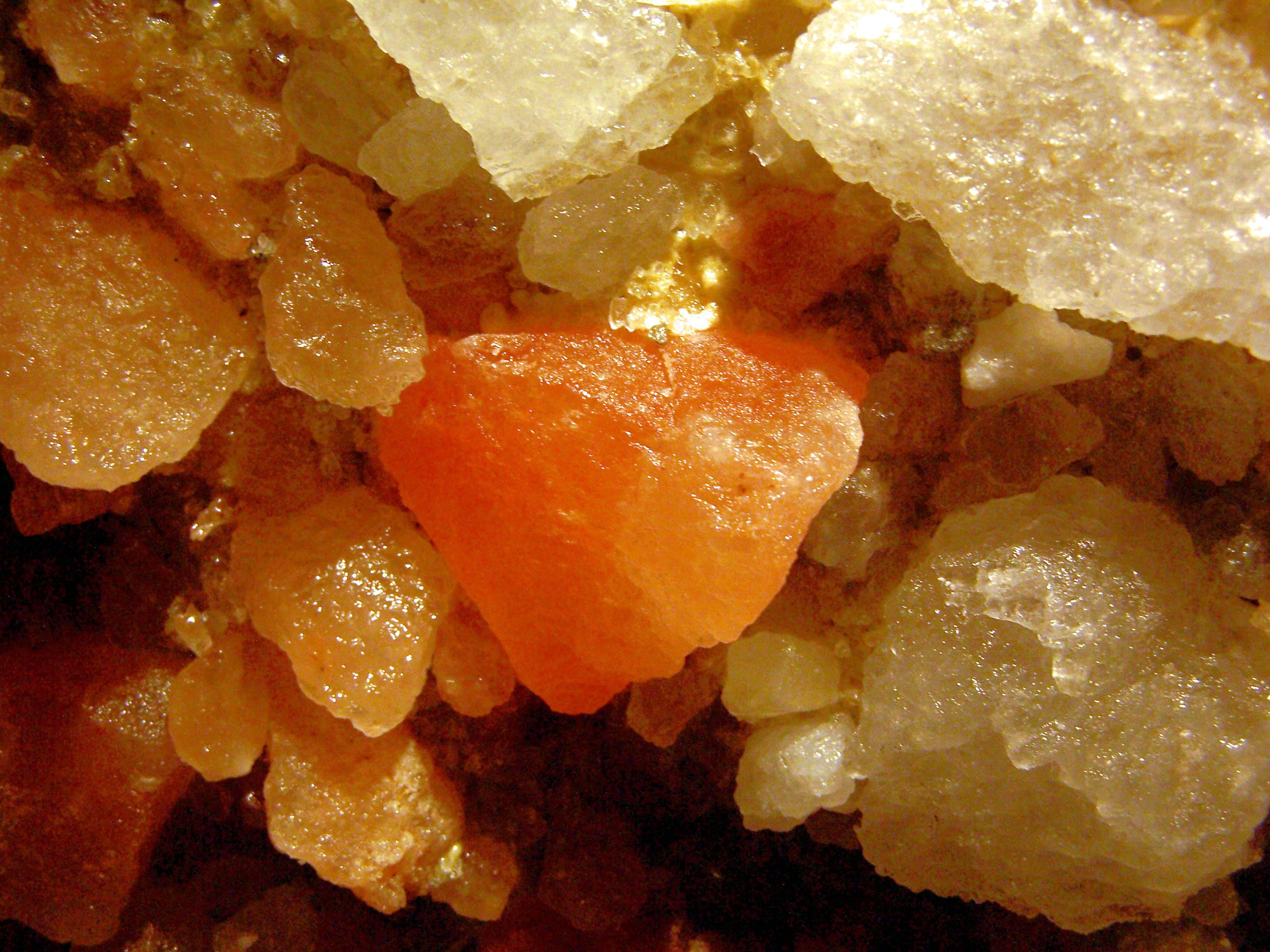
Halite

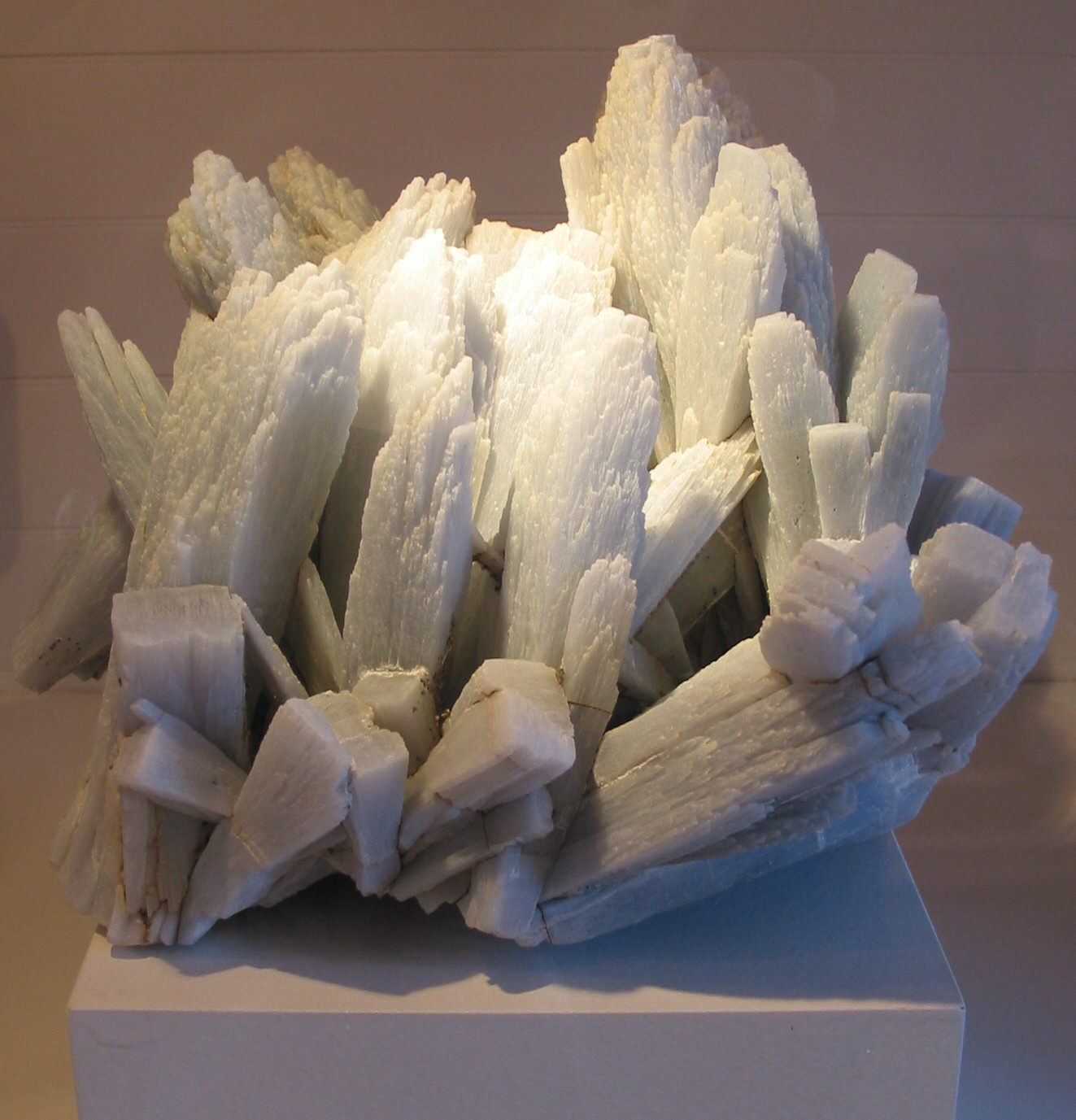
Anhydrate

Carbonate formation
(Carlsbad Caverns)

== Residual/capillary trapping ==
Higher capillary forces to buoyant forces cause carbon dioxide to appear as pore-scale bubbles in the formation. This is a process through which micrometer scale carbon dioxide bubbles are immobilized by capillary forces within the complex pore structure of the storage rock.

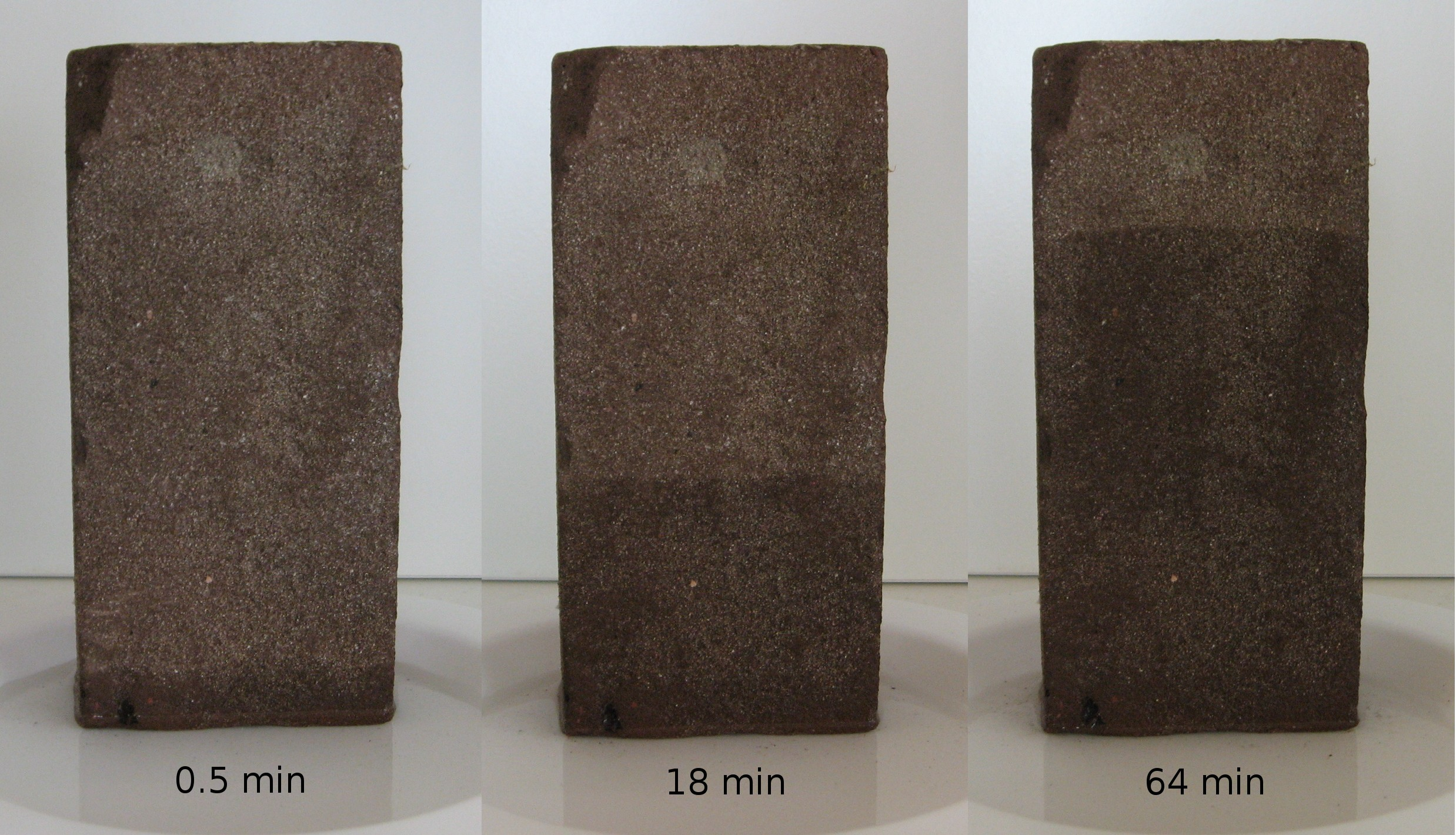
Capillary water flow in a brick that is in contact with water at the bottom.

An example of buoyant forces

3-D animation of an example of pore structure

== Dissolution trapping ==
Carbon dioxide can dissolve into any water already present in the storage formation. As dissolution proceeds, the water phase density will increase, resulting in downward convective flow of the carbon dioxide saturated water.

An example of a molecule interacting with water by means of dissolution.
(Sodium ion example)

Animation example of downward convection flow

== Mineral trapping ==
Chemical reactions between carbon dioxide, water, ions dissolved in the water, and formation minerals can result in carbon dioxide being permanently stored as a solid mineral phase. Examples of rocks where this can take place are mafic or ultramafic lithologies.

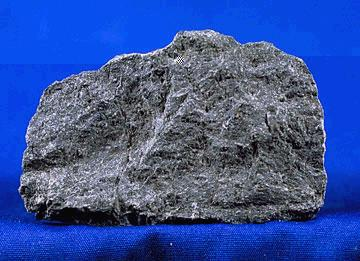
Mafic rock (Basalt)

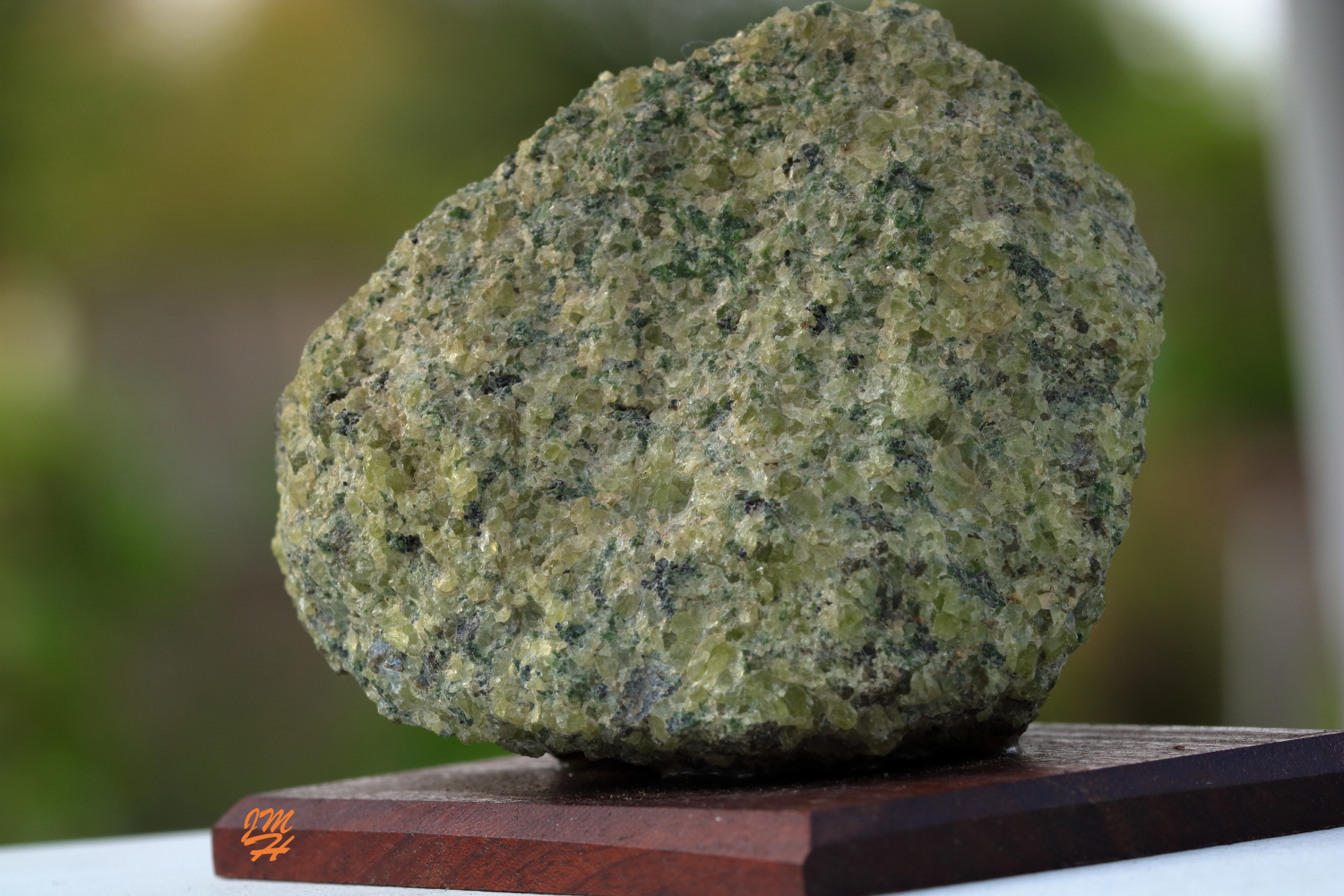
Ultramaifc (Peridotite)
