= Direct deep-sea carbon dioxide injection =

Type of climate engineering

Direct deep-sea carbon dioxide injection was a (now abandoned) technology proposal with the aim to remove carbon dioxide from the atmosphere by direct injection into the deep ocean to store it there for centuries. At the ocean bottom, the pressures would be great enough for CO_{2} to be in its liquid phase. The idea behind ocean injection was to have stable, stationary pools of CO_{2} at the ocean floor. The ocean could potentially hold over a thousand billion tons of CO_{2}. However, the interest in this avenue of carbon storage has much reduced since about 2001 because of concerns about the unknown impacts on marine life, high costs and concerns about its stability or permanence.

A special IPCC report in 2005 summarized the research status at that time. Back then, it was found that "Deep ocean storage could help reduce the impact of CO_{2} emissions on surface ocean biology but at the expense of effects on deep-ocean biology." Furthermore, it was regarded as doubtful whether the public would accept this technology as part of a climate change mitigation strategy.

The IPCC Fourth Assessment Report in 2007 referred to this technology as ocean storage. However nowadays that term is used more widely as part of carbon capture and storage and carbon sequestration in the ocean. For example, the IPCC Fifth Assessment Report in 2014 no longer mentioned the term ocean storage in its report on climate change mitigation methods. The most recent IPCC Sixth Assessment Report in 2022 also no longer includes any mention of ocean storage in its Carbon Dioxide Removal taxonomy. Instead there is now more focus on blue carbon management in coastal zones.

== Context ==
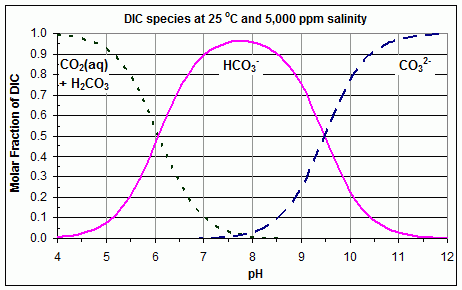
Major components after carbon dioxide dissolution in the ocean

Oceans cover slightly more than 70% of the total surface area of the Earth, and play a major role in Earth's climate system. Due to the solubility of carbon dioxide in water, CO_{2} naturally dissolves in oceanic waters to form an equilibrium. With an increase in the concentration of carbon dioxide in the atmosphere, the position of equilibrium pushes the equilibrium in the direction such that more CO_{2} dissolves into the water. Due to this mechanism, more than 500 Gtons of carbon dioxide (amounting to a total of 140 Gtons of carbon) of anthropogenic carbon dioxide emissions released over the past 200 years have been absorbed by the oceans. With increasing atmospheric CO_{2} concentrations released due to human activities as compared to levels before the Industrialization, oceans are currently absorbing 7 Gt carbon dioxide per annum.

After atmospheric carbon dioxide dissolves into the ocean, part of the carbon dioxide reacts with seawater to form carbonic acid. As carbonic acid continues to interact with water molecules, carbonate is formed, which increases the concentration of hydrogen ions in the ocean and consequently reduces ocean pH. Therefore, increasing carbon dioxide concentrations in the atmosphere decreases ocean pH in a process called ocean acidification.

The concept of purposefully injecting carbon dioxide into the deeper parts of the ocean was first proposed by Italian physicist Cesare Marchetti in 1976. It was thought that dilute carbon dioxide injection at 0.37 GTC/yr would have a negligible effect on ocean pH. Dilute ocean injection requires little infrastructure in comparison to other forms of ocean injection.

A review in 2022 explained that: "In 1997 in Kyoto, during UNFCCC COP-3, an international project agreement was signed for the study of direct CO_{2} injection, with sponsors from the U.S. Department of Energy, the New Energy and Industrial Technology Development Organization of Japan, and the Norwegian Research Council." There was, however criticism from various organizations, including Greenpeace, due to the unknown impacts on deep marine life and any legal implications. This criticism was regarded as a showstopper from about 2003 onwards.

== Design aspects ==
=== Dilute carbon dioxide injection and storage ===
Dilute carbon dioxide injection requires injection at depths where carbon dioxide can be dispersed by ocean currents and ocean mixing. Upon injection, waters interact and mix based on density and dilute the concentration of carbon dioxide. Boat based carbon dioxide injection distributes low carbon dioxide concentrations in open waters while moving to increase carbon dioxide dispersal area. Carbon dioxide dispersal via boat can also occur by a pipe attached to the ship injecting a dilute carbon dioxide mixture into the water column. The carbon dioxide would be injected at 1000 m depth to reduce carbon dioxide bubble escape. As injected carbon dioxide bubbles rise, dispersal increases up the water column.

Studies show that delivering liquid carbon dioxide by a towed pipeline (attached to boat traveling perpendicular to the current), can minimize clumps of highly concentrated carbon dioxide levels. Delivery by fixed pipe would be confined to a small region of the ocean and in turn instantly kill sensitive species inhabiting the region. There is consensus among scientists that ocean sequestration of carbon dioxide is not a long-term plan to be relied on, but may solve immediate atmospheric concerns if implemented temporarily. Scientists believe that it is possible to engineer ways to discharge carbon dioxide at rates that resemble the natural fluctuation of carbon dioxide in the oceans.

=== Release of solid carbon dioxide at depth ===
Carbon dioxide ocean storage can occur through solid or solid hydrate of carbon dioxide. The solid state density of carbon dioxide is approximately 1.5 times greater than seawater and thus tends to sink to the ocean floor. The dissolving rate at the surface is about 0.2 cm/hr such that a small quantity of carbon dioxide can be completely dissolved before reaching the sea floor. In addition to solid carbon dioxide injection, carbon dioxide hydrate is another popular method for storage. Hydrate formation takes place when the dissolved concentration of liquid carbon dioxide is around 30% and 400 meters below sea level. Hydrates form as an external layer around liquid carbon dioxide droplets or as a solid mass. The molecular composition is composed of carbon dioxide and water, carbon dioxide•nH_{2}O (n ≈ 5.75). The resulting density is denser than seawater by approximately 10%. Compared to liquid carbon dioxide, the hydrate form dissolves significantly slower in seawater, at about 0.2 cm/hr as well. Additionally, the hydrate remains immobile on the seafloor and forms hydrate cap, forcing liquid carbon dioxide to only move laterally.

The overall molecular stability relies on the temperature and pressure of the environment, and hydrates only dissociate when placed in direct contact with additional heat and water at concentrations below its equilibrium concentration. However, due to its crystalline structure, pure hydrate does not travel through pipes. Given that 100% efficiency is extremely difficult to achieve, in reality, both laboratory and field experiments suggest that sinking reaction efficiency is approximately 15–25%. Any kind of instability of hydrates is likely to cause dissolution and dispersion during the descending or injection process.

=== Carbon dioxide plumes ===
Researchers have been able to show in lab and in small in situ experiments that carbon dioxide can be injected into oceans as rising or sinking plumes. The plume will sink if it is more dense than seawater. This should occur if the plume, a mix of carbon dioxide and seawater, is injected at depths of 3 km. As the plume moves vertically, it will dissolve at least partially due to convective mass transfer with the passing seawater. Dissolution is increased by increased currents perpendicular to the vertical water column containing the plume because of the increase convective mass transfer. For sinking plumes, minimal horizontal currents are desired so that the plume can sink to the ocean floor for longer term sequestration. The opposite is desired for rising plumes, which similarly to other previously mentioned dilute ocean storage techniques, relies on the dispersal to make the change in carbon dioxide concentration in the ocean low enough to not affect the marine biosphere significantly.

The proposed method of injection is droplets of supercritical carbon dioxide mixed with seawater. Plumes can be engineered to dissolve at different rates based on the size, concentration, and rate of injection of the carbon dioxide/seawater droplets. For rising plumes which rely on dissolution to sequester carbon dioxide, a smaller droplet with a greater rate of injection is better because it leads to faster dissolution. Sinking plumes ideally form lakes of carbon dioxide on the ocean floor for more long term sequestration.

=== Carbon dioxide lakes ===
Carbon dioxide lakes will form on ocean floors in depressions or trenches in the seabed. These lakes sequester carbon dioxide through isolation. The deep ocean has a very slow rate of mixing with the surface ocean. Additionally, the surface of the carbon dioxide lake will form a layer of crystal hydrates that will slow dissolution of carbon dioxide into the above ocean. Convective motion over the surface of the lake due to ocean bottom storms or normal sea currents will increase dissolution. Without any bulk flow over the lake, the storage timeline of the carbon dioxide is 10,000 years for a 50 m deep lake. This number is decreased by more than 25 times with currents from ocean bottom storms.

Sites would be chosen based on ocean floor depth, seismic and volcanic activity, and the presence of CaCO_{3} deposits that could increase the rate of carbon mineralization. Some sites proposed for storage at depths greater than 6 km include the Indonesian Sunda trench, the Japanese Ryukyu trench, and the Puerto Rico trench.

=== Use of clathrate hydrates ===
The use of clathrate hydrates can be implemented in order to reduce speed of dissolution of carbon dioxide. The hydrates give carbon dioxide a negative buoyancy, allowing injection to occur at surface levels rather than through pipelines. Experiments showed that the use of clathrate hydrates minimized the rate at which the injected carbon dioxide spread throughout the ocean floor. This rate proved to minimize impact on deep sea organisms. The intactness of the hydrates relies heavily on the ocean current's magnitude at the site of injection. The carbon dioxide dissolved into surface waters before the hydrate was able to sink to the deep ocean (10–55% of carbon dioxide remained stuck to the hydrate at depths of 1500m into the ocean). In laboratory experiments, continuous streams of hydrates have not yet been achieved.

== Costs ==
A cost estimate from 2007 put the costs for this technology at 5-30 US$ per ton of CO_{2} net injected. This cost estimate was "including offshore transportation of 100 to 500 km".

The IEA Greenhouse Gas R&D Programme estimated that dilute carbon dioxide injection would cost $70 per tonne of carbon dioxide including costs of carbon capture, transport, and storage before boat dispersal.

== Challenges ==
The challenges were summarized in 2006 as follows: "unknown biological impacts, high costs, impermanence of ocean storage, and concerns regarding public acceptance". The issue of impermanence is due to the fact that over a few hundred years, the injected CO_{2} will re-equilibrate with the atmosphere.

An assessment in 2013 summarised the state of the art as follows: Objectively the fears over direct ocean CO_{2} disposal are unwarranted; it would be too expensive, too controversial, and technically challenging to transfer large quantities of CO_{2} to great depth. But in any case such efforts would be dwarfed by the approximately 1 million tons of fossil fuel CO_{2} per hour now being transferred from air to sea. Nonetheless, urgent discussions surrounding the concept of direct ocean CO_{2} disposal greatly aided the modern scientific understanding of the impacts of elevated CO_{2} on the ocean.

== Environmental impacts ==
Researchers are studying how ecosystems are affected before and after injection of liquid carbon dioxide through "process studies, surveys of biogeochemical tracers, and ocean bottom studies." The challenge comes from the spatial range of the ocean and the time-scale at which effects would be taking place, making it difficult to detect these effects precisely. There is very limited knowledge as to what organisms and ecosystems exist in this unexplored area and the interdependence of such ecosystems. The following is specifically pertaining to deep ocean sequestration through dilute injection, but touches on alternate methods (injection by towed pipeline, injection by stationary pipeline, use of hydrates). Due to the size of the ocean, the predictions and conclusions regarding the environmental risk of this sequestration process are based on small-scale experiments that have been extrapolated to show possible results on a scale as large as the ocean.

=== Deep sea biota ===
Ocean sequestration in deep sea sediments has the potential to impact deep sea life. The chemical and physical composition of the deep sea does not undergo changes in the way that surface waters do. Due to its limited contact with the atmosphere, most organisms have evolved with very little physical and chemical disturbance and exposed to minimal levels of carbon dioxide. Most of their energy is obtained from feeding off of particulate matter that descends from the surface water of the ocean and its ecosystems. Deep sea ecosystems do not have rapid reproduction rates nor give birth to many offspring because of their limited access to oxygen and nutrients. In particular, species that inhabit the 2000–3000 m deep range of the ocean have small, diverse populations. Introducing lethal amounts of carbon dioxide into the environment of such a species can have a serious impact on the population size and will take longer to recover relative to surface water species.

=== Long term effects ===
If deep-sea ocean sequestration becomes a common practice, long term effects will continue to be investigated to predict future scenarios of deep sea impacts by carbon dioxide. Ocean sequestration of liquid carbon dioxide would not only impact deep-sea ecosystems, but in the long-run would begin to affect surface-water species.

Although the long-term effects are the most relevant to understand, they are also the most difficult to predict accurately due to the scale of the ocean and the diversity in species sensitivity to elevated carbon dioxide levels. Surface sea organisms have been better studied than deep-sea animals in terms of consequences due to prolonged carbon dioxide exposure and have been proven to experience reduced calcification and damage to their skeletons. This more seriously affects shelled animals' mortality and growth rate. Adult fish showed remarkable tolerance to elevated carbon dioxide levels, only when dissolution of carbon dioxide occurred at a slow rate. Developing fish showed less tolerance than their adult fish counterparts.

Supporters of ocean sequestration argue that because of the ocean's size, diluted carbon dioxide injections will not be enough to create an actual impact on ecosystems and that species can evolve to these increased levels of carbon dioxide eventually. The capacity of deep-sea organisms to acclimate to the injection of carbon dioxide has not been investigated and the hypothesis that they will evolve in time lacks scientific support. Scientific research shows that sites of injection are spatially specific and ecosystems that happen to inhabit the site of injection can suffer immediate consequences. Affected areas will experience acidification, due to the augmented bicarbonate levels, and in turn a decrease in calcium carbonate levels. This will cause sediments and shells of organisms to more quickly dissolve.

== See also ==
- Carbon sequestration – Storing carbon in a carbon pool
- Carbon storage in the North Sea – Storage of carbon dioxide in the North Sea
- Climate change mitigation – Actions to reduce net greenhouse gas emissions to limit climate change
- Climate engineering – Deliberate and large-scale intervention in Earth's climate system
- Oceanic carbon cycle – Ocean/atmosphere carbon exchange process
