= Solubility pump =

Physico-chemical process which transports carbon

Air-sea exchange of CO_{2}

In oceanic biogeochemistry, the solubility pump is a physicochemical process that transports carbon as dissolved inorganic carbon (DIC) from the ocean's surface to its interior. The solubility pump can be influenced by several environmental and biotic factors, which can enhance or reduce the strength of the solubility pump and the solubility of carbon dioxide in the ocean.

The solubility pump can act as a sink for carbon dioxide released into the atmosphere by anthropogenic activities. Though most of the carbon dioxide released via anthropogenic activities will dissolve in the ocean eventually, the exact rate that this will occur is unknown. Increased warming of the ocean due to climate change, as well as slowed thermohaline circulation in the ocean, can reduce to amount of carbon dioxide taken up from the atmosphere into the ocean. Additionally, increased uptake of carbon dioxide in the ocean leads to ocean acidification, which can be problematic for marine life.

== Overview ==
The solubility pump is driven by the coincidence of two processes in the ocean :

- The solubility of carbon dioxide is a strong inverse function of seawater temperature (i.e. solubility is greater in cooler water)
- The thermohaline circulation is driven by the formation of deep water at high latitudes where seawater is usually cooler and denser

Since deep water (that is, seawater in the ocean's interior) is formed under the same surface conditions that promote carbon dioxide solubility, it contains a higher concentration of dissolved inorganic carbon than might be expected from average surface concentrations. Consequently, these two processes act together to pump carbon from the atmosphere into the ocean's interior.

One consequence of this is that when deep water upwells in warmer, equatorial latitudes, it strongly outgasses carbon dioxide to the atmosphere because of the reduced solubility of the gas.

Other environmental factors also affect the solubility pump, such as sea ice formation. The formation of sea ice has dynamics that can both increase and decrease exchange between the air and the sea.

There can also be regional differences in the effect of the solubility pump due to factors such a varying temperatures and differences in wind stress on the solubility pump.

The exchange of carbon within the solubility pump can be monitored by various gasses. Nitrogen and noble gasses such as arsenic and krypton can be used to trace the amount of cycling of gasses, including carbon, between the air and the sea. In addition, ocean chemistry in general has an effect on the amount of carbon dioxide in the atmosphere. Marine biota can also alter the amount of δ^{13}CO_{2} in the atmosphere.

The solubility pump has a biological counterpart known as the biological pump. For an overview of both pumps, see Raven & Falkowski (1999). While the solubility pump is effected by factors such as noble gas exchange and environmental conditions, the biological pump can be affected by factors such as the marine food web, and the biological pump can impact atmospheric carbon dioxide concentrations overall.

== Carbon dioxide solubility ==
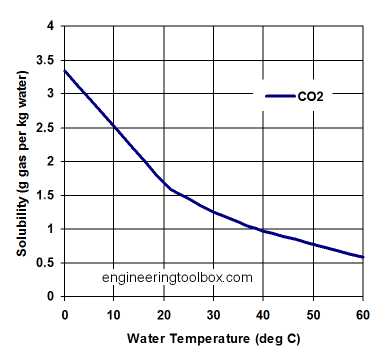
Carbon dioxide solubility in water, temperature dependency

Carbon dioxide, like other gases, is soluble in water. However, unlike many other gases (oxygen for instance), it reacts with water and forms a balance of several ionic and non-ionic species (collectively known as dissolved inorganic carbon, or DIC). These are dissolved free carbon dioxide (CO_{2(aq)}), carbonic acid (H_{2}CO_{3}), bicarbonate (HCO^{−}_{3}) and carbonate (CO^{2−}_{3}), and they interact with water as follows:

CO_{2}_{(aq)} + H_{2}O ⇌ H_{2}CO_{3} ⇌ HCO^{−}_{3} + H^{+} ⇌ CO^{2−}_{3} + 2 H^{+}

The balance of these carbonate species (which ultimately affects the solubility of carbon dioxide), is dependent on factors such as pH, as shown in a Bjerrum plot. In seawater this is regulated by the charge balance of a number of positive (e.g. Na^{+}, K^{+}, Mg^{2+}, Ca^{2+}) and negative (e.g. CO^{2−}_{3} itself, Cl^{−}, SO^{2−}_{4}, Br^{−}) ions. Normally, the balance of these species leaves a net positive charge. With respect to the carbonate system, this excess positive charge shifts the balance of carbonate species towards negative ions to compensate. The result of which is a reduced concentration of the free carbon dioxide and carbonic acid species, which in turn leads to an oceanic uptake of carbon dioxide from the atmosphere to restore balance. Thus, the greater the positive charge imbalance, the greater the solubility of carbon dioxide. In carbonate chemistry terms, this imbalance is referred to as alkalinity.

In terms of measurement, four basic parameters are of key importance: Total inorganic carbon (TIC, T_{CO_{2}} or C_{T}), Total alkalinity (T_{ALK} or A_{T}), pH, and pCO_{2}. Measuring any two of these parameters allows for the determination of a wide range of pH-dependent species (including the above-mentioned species). This balance can be changed by a number of processes. For example, the air-sea flux of CO_{2}, the dissolution or precipitation of CaCO_{3}, or biological activity such as photosynthesis or respiration. Each of these has different effects on each of the four basic parameters, and together they exert strong influences on global cycles. The net and local charge of the oceans remains neutral during any chemical process.

== Anthropogenic changes ==
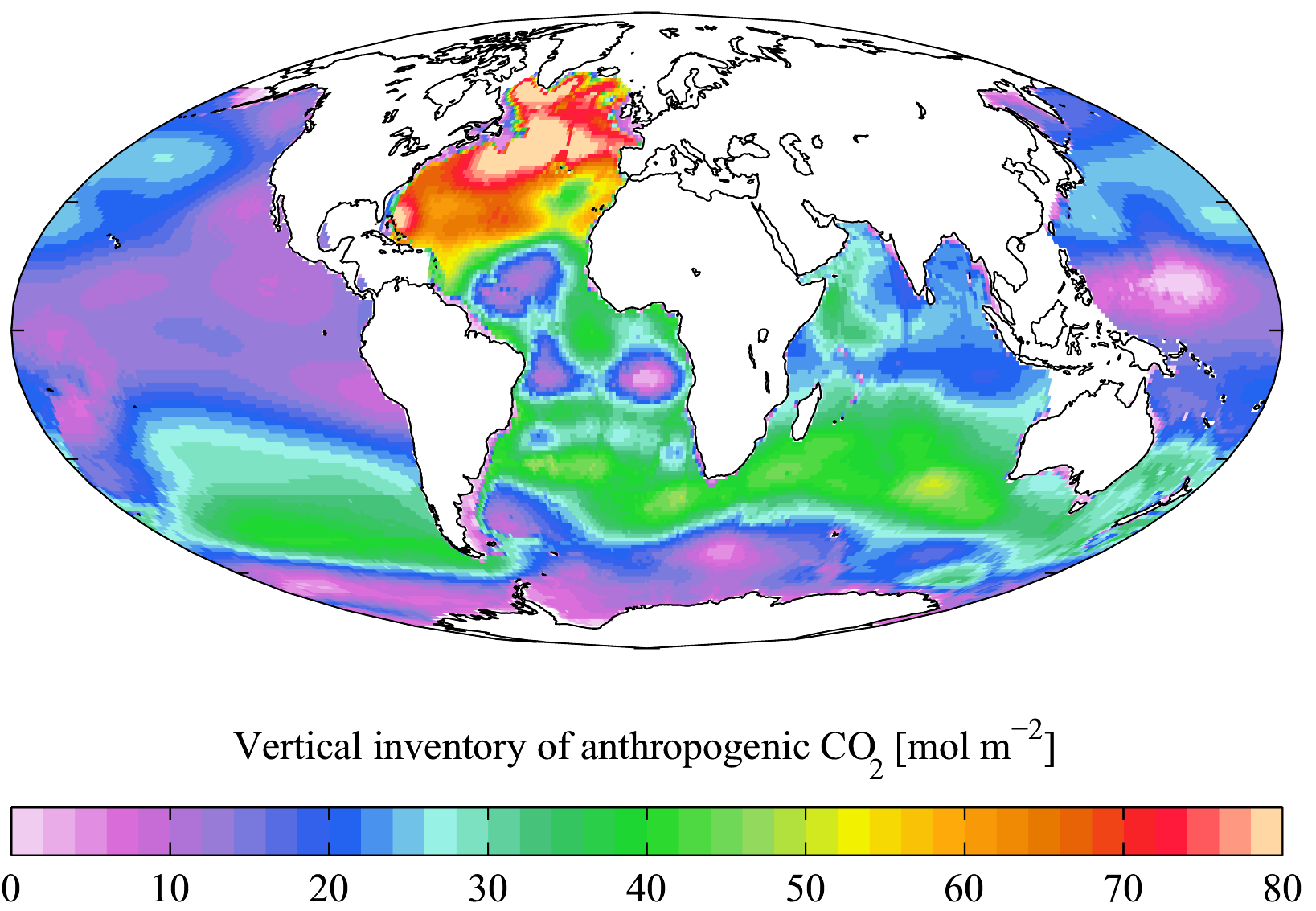
Vertical inventory of "present day" (1990s) anthropogenic CO_{2}

The combustion of fossil fuels, land-use changes, and the production of cement have led to a flux of CO_{2} to the atmosphere. Presently, about one third (approximately 2 gigatons of carbon per year) of anthropogenic emissions of CO_{2} are believed to be entering the ocean. The solubility pump is the primary mechanism driving this flux, with the consequence that anthropogenic CO_{2} is reaching the ocean interior via high latitude sites of deep water formation (particularly the North Atlantic). Ultimately, most of the CO_{2} emitted by human activities will dissolve in the ocean, however the rate at which the ocean will take it up in the future is less certain.

In a study of carbon cycle up to the end of the 21st century, Cox et al. (2000) predicted that the rate of CO_{2} uptake will begin to saturate at a maximum rate at 5 gigatons of carbon per year by 2100. This was partially due to non-linearities in the seawater carbonate system, but also due to climate change. Ocean warming decreases the solubility of CO_{2} in seawater, slowing the ocean's response to emissions. Warming also acts to increase ocean stratification, isolating the surface ocean from deeper waters. Additionally, changes in the ocean's thermohaline circulation (specifically slowing) may act to decrease transport of dissolved CO_{2} into the deep ocean. However, the magnitude of these processes is still uncertain, preventing good long-term estimates of the fate of the solubility pump.

Research has been done on the concept of using pipes in oceans to increase the uptake of CO_{2} by the ocean, making use of the biological pump and increasing the ocean's ability to act as a carbon sink in order to combat climate change. However, due to the relative inefficiency of the solubility pump in transporting significant amounts of CO_{2} from the atmosphere to the ocean, increasing the effect of the ocean as a CO_{2} sink by using pipes would require a very large amount of pipes (approximately 800 million pipes, each with a diameter of 1 meter).

While ocean absorption of anthropogenic CO_{2} from the atmosphere acts to decrease climate change, it causes ocean acidification which is believed will have negative consequences for marine ecosystems.

== See also ==
- Alkalinity
- Biological pump
- Continental shelf pump
- Ocean acidification
- Thermohaline circulation
- Total inorganic carbon
