= Ocean Wise Conservation Association =

Global nonprofit marine conservation organization based in Vancouver, Canada

- Nickname: Ocean Wise
- Formation: 2017
- Type: Nonprofit organization
- Purpose: Ocean conservation
- Headquarters: Vancouver,British Columbia, Canada
- Interim CEO: Jennie Moushos (since 2025)
- Rormer President & CEO: Lasse Gustavsson
- Website: ocean.org

Ocean Wise Conservation Association, or simply Ocean Wise, is a global nonprofit marine conservation organization based in Vancouver, British Columbia, Canada. It works to protect and restore the health of the world's ocean through scientific research, education, public engagement, sustainable seafood initiatives, citizen science programs, and direct environmental action.

== History ==
Ocean Wise traces its roots to marine conservation programs developed at the Vancouver Aquarium Marine Science Centre in the mid‑20th century. The Vancouver Aquarium, opened in 1956, became a leading institution in marine research and education in Canada.

The Great Canadian Shoreline Cleanup, now one of Canada's largest volunteer‑led conservation programs, began in 1994 along the shoreline of Stanley Park in Vancouver, led by a small team of Vancouver Aquarium staff and volunteers, and expanded nationally by 2002 to include thousands of participants across Canada.

In 2005, the sustainable seafood program that would later become an integral part of Ocean Wise was launched at the Vancouver Aquarium. The Ocean Wise sustainable seafood program has been described in independent surveys as one of the most widely recognized sustainable seafood ecolabels among Canadian consumers.

In 2017, Ocean Wise was established as a global nonprofit dedicated to ocean conservation, expanding beyond its origins in aquarium‑based programs. This reorganization aimed to shift from an aquarium‑centric approach to a broader, globally focused marine conservation organization.

In 2021, ownership of the Vancouver Aquarium was transferred from Ocean Wise to Herschend Family Enterprises due to financial challenges associated with the COVID-19 pandemic. Ocean Wise remained an independent charitable organization focused on conservation and education, with a commitment from the aquarium's new operator to support Ocean Wise's work through an annual donation equal to 1% of the aquarium's gross revenues to its conservation and education programs.

In 2022, Ocean Wise also introduced a new brand identity, including an updated visual design and a revised Ocean Wise Seafood symbol, as part of a broader organizational repositioning following the aquarium sale.

As of 2025, Ocean Wise Conservation Association continues its operations through international conservation initiatives, public advocacy, and research-based programs. During this period, the organization launched the Invest in the Ocean campaign, highlighting the importance of protecting ocean health and supporting sustainable fisheries, marine biodiversity, and the livelihoods of communities dependent on the ocean. The campaign emphasizes the ocean's role in carbon absorption, oxygen production, and global food security, while reinforcing Ocean Wise's ongoing conservation, education, and restoration initiatives in marine environments.

== Structure and mission ==
Ocean Wise operates as a registered charity under Canadian law and as a nonprofit environmental organization. Its stated mission is to build a global community that takes meaningful action to protect and restore our ocean. The organization emphasizes inclusion, equity, and global engagement in its conservation initiatives.

== Programs and activities ==
Ocean Wise conducts and supports scientific research to inform conservation planning and policy. Programs include the Ocean Wise Sightings Network, a long‑running citizen science initiative for documenting cetacean (whale, dolphin, and porpoise) sightings that contributes to monitoring and protection efforts.

The Ocean Wise Shoreline Cleanup (formerly Great Canadian Shoreline Cleanup) is one of the organization's major direct action efforts, mobilizing volunteers to remove litter from shorelines and collect data on pollution sources. Started by Vancouver Aquarium staff in 1994, it has grown into a national program engaging thousands of volunteers across Canada and beyond, and in partnership with Tru Earth Ocean Wise expanded the initiative into the United States through the Great American Shoreline Cleanup to engage communities in California and Texas in tackling shoreline plastic pollution.

The organization runs educational and leadership programs aimed at youth and communities to increase ocean literacy and empower conservation action. Examples include youth leadership initiatives and immersive learning experiences, both in‑person and online.

Ocean Wise also conducts and supports additional marine‑focused initiatives, including seaforestation, an effort to restore and cultivate underwater kelp forests to benefit biodiversity and ocean health, the Ocean Wise Plastics Lab, a research facility that studies microplastic pollution and develops science‑based approaches to reduce plastic inputs to the ocean, and the Whale Report Alert System (WRAS), a real‑time tool that provides commercial mariners with whale location information to help reduce the risk of vessel strikes on cetaceans.

== Partnerships and recognition ==
Ocean Wise collaborates with government agencies, academic institutions, businesses, and other nonprofit organizations on conservation research and public engagement efforts.

In 2023, the Government of Canada partnered with Ocean Wise to elevate the role of young professionals in international marine protected area discussions at IMPAC5.

Ocean Wise maintains the Ocean Wise Seafood program, which partners with restaurants, markets, and suppliers to promote sustainable seafood choices. The program provides criteria for assessing seafood products to support environmentally responsible fishing and aquaculture practices. Key commercial partners have included major Canadian retailers such as Sobeys and Safeway, as well as seafood suppliers like True North Seafood (part of the Cooke Inc. group), which carry or recommend Ocean Wise‑approved products. The program was co‑founded by Vancouver chef Robert Clark, who was appointed to the Order of Canada in recognition of his role in establishing and advancing sustainable seafood awareness through the program.

DP World has partnered with Ocean Wise to expand the WRAS, providing financial and technical resources to enhance real‑time whale detection and reduce vessel strikes, contributing to the protection of marine ecosystems.

Tru Earth is a founding sponsor of the American Shoreline Cleanup program in partnership with Ocean Wise, supporting volunteer engagement in beach cleanups and other conservation initiatives to protect and restore marine ecosystems.
