= Roger Revelle =

American scientist (1909–1991)

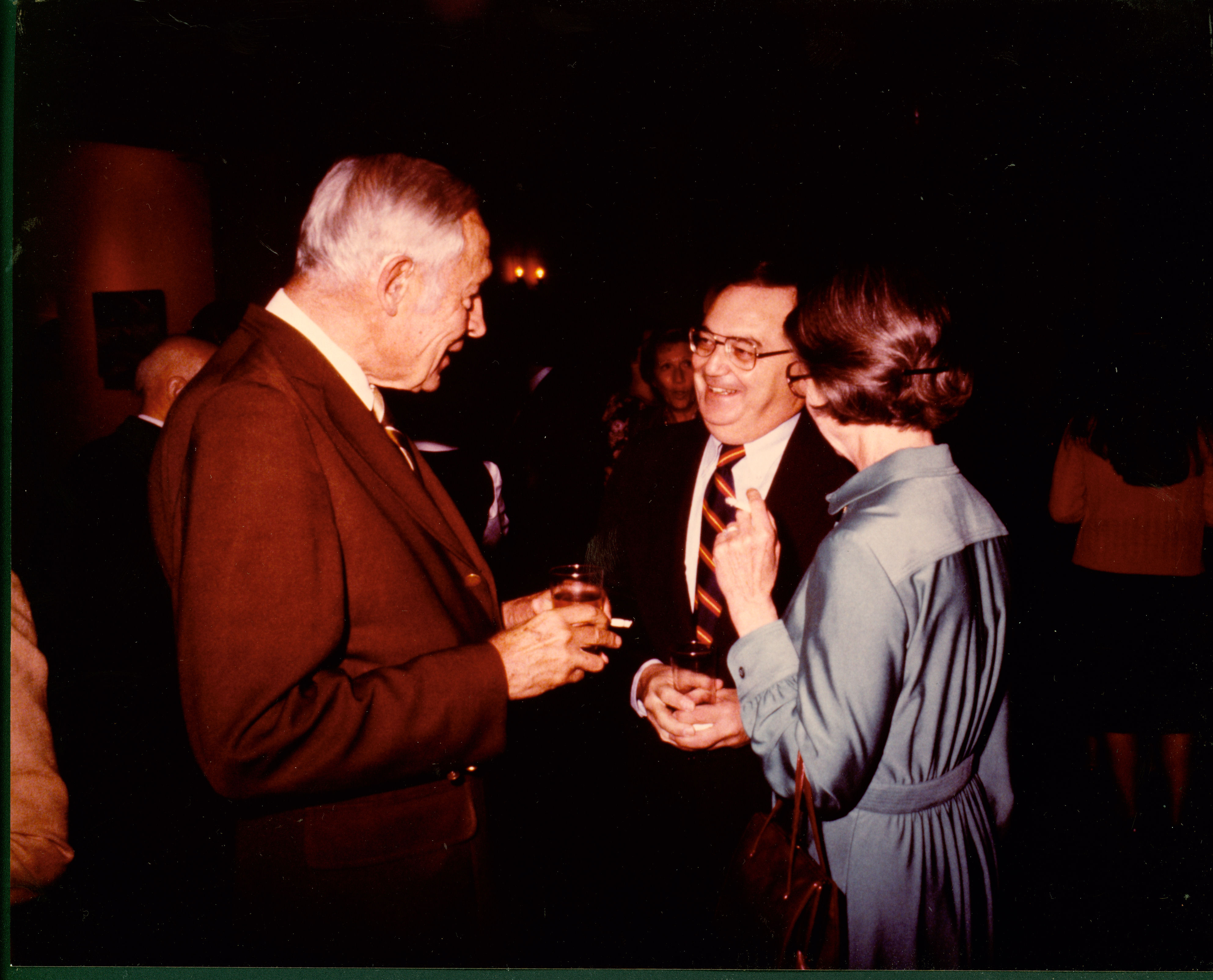
- Roger Revelle (left) with Robert and Mavis White in 1977
- Born: Roger Randall Dougan Revelle; March 7, 1909; Seattle, Washington, U.S.
- Died: July 15, 1991 (aged 82); San Diego, California, U.S.
- Education: Pomona College; University of California, Berkeley
- Children: William Revelle, Carolyn Revelle, Mary Ellen Revelle Paci, Anne Shumway
- Awards: Alexander Agassiz Medal (1963); Tyler Prize for Environmental Achievement (1984); Vannevar Bush Award (1984); William Bowie Medal (1968); National Medal of Science (1990)
- Scientific career
- Workplaces: Scripps Institution of Oceanography; University of California, San Diego

The atmospheric CO_{2} concentration

Roger Randall Dougan Revelle (March 7, 1909 – July 15, 1991) was a scientist and scholar who was instrumental in the formative years of the University of California, San Diego, and was among the early scientists to study anthropogenic global warming, as well as the movement of Earth's tectonic plates. UC San Diego's first college is named Revelle College in his honor.

== Career ==
Roger Revelle was born in Seattle to William Roger Revelle and Ella Dougan. He grew up in southern California. After graduating from Pomona College in 1929 with early studies in geology, he earned a PhD in oceanography from the University of California, Berkeley, in 1936. In 1931, he married Ellen Clark (1910-2009), a graduate of Scripps College in psychology. While at UC Berkeley, Roger studied under George Louderback and was initiated into Theta Tau Professional Engineering Fraternity, which started as a mining engineering fraternity and maintained a strong affinity for geology and geological engineering students. Much of his early work in oceanography took place at Scripps Institution of Oceanography (SIO) in San Diego. He was also oceanographer for the Navy during WWII. He was director of SIO from 1950 to 1964. He stood against the UC faculty being required to take an anti-communist oath during the Joseph McCarthy period. He served as Science Advisor to Interior Secretary Stewart Udall during the Kennedy Administration in the early 1960s and was president of the American Association for the Advancement of Science (1974).

=== Growth of oceanography ===
Revelle was deeply involved in the growth of oceanography in the United States and internationally after World War II. Working for the Navy in the late 1940s, he helped to determine which projects gained funding. He also promoted the idea that the Navy ought to support "basic research" instead of only trying to build new technology. At Scripps he launched several major long-range expeditions in the 1950s, including the MIDPAC, TRANSPAC (with Canada and Japan), EQUAPAC, and NORPAC, each traversing a different part of the Pacific Ocean. He and other scientists at Scripps Institution of Oceanography helped the U.S. government to plan nuclear weapons tests, in the hope that oceanographers might make use of the data. Revelle was one of the committee chairmen in the influential National Academy of Sciences studies of the biological effects of atomic radiation (BEAR), the results of which were published in 1956. In 1952, along with Dr. Seibert Q. Duntley, he successfully moved the MIT Visibility Lab to SIO with financial support of the U.S. Navy. Along with oceanographers at the Woods Hole Oceanographic Institution, Revelle planned the American contributions to the oceanographic program of the International Geophysical Year (IGY). He became the first president of the Scientific Committee on Oceanic Research, an international group of scientists devoted to advising on international projects, and was a frequent adviser to the Intergovernmental Oceanographic Commission, created in 1960.

=== Global warming ===
Revelle was instrumental in creating the International Geophysical Year (IGY) in 1958 and was founding chairman of the first Committee on Climate Change and the Ocean (CCCO) under the Scientific Committee on Ocean Research (SCOR) and the International Oceanic Commission (IOC). During planning for the IGY, under Revelle's directorship, SIO participated in and later became the principal center for the Atmospheric Carbon Dioxide Program. In July 1956, Charles David Keeling joined the SIO staff to head the program and began measurements of atmospheric carbon dioxide at the Mauna Loa Observatory on Mauna Loa, Hawaii, and in Antarctica.

Hans Suess was recruited by Revelle, and they co-authored a 1957 article using carbon-14 isotope levels to assess the rate at which carbon dioxide added by fossil fuel combustion since the start of the industrial revolution had accumulated in the atmosphere. They concluded that most of it had been absorbed by the Earth's oceans, contrary to the assumption made by early geoscientists (Chamberlin, Arhenius and Callendar) that it would simply accumulate in the upper atmosphere to "lower the mean level of back radiation in the infrared and thereby increase the average temperature near the Earth's surface". There had been little sign to date of this greenhouse effect causing the anticipated warming, but the Suess–Revelle article suggested that increasing human gas emissions might change this. They said that "human beings are now carrying out a large scale geophysical experiment of a kind that could not have happened in the past nor be reproduced in the future".

Revelle told journalists about the issues and testified to Congress that "The Earth itself is a space ship", endangered by rising seas and desertification. A November 1957 report in The Hammond Times described his research as suggesting that "a large scale global warming, with radical climate changes may result" – the first use of the term global warming. A biographer of Suess later said that, although other articles in the same journal discussed carbon-dioxide levels, the Suess–Revelle article was "the only one of the three to stress the growing quantity of CO_{2} contributed by our burning of fossil fuel, and to call attention to the fact that it might cause global warming over time".

Revelle and Suess described the "buffer factor", now known as the "Revelle factor", which is a resistance to atmospheric carbon dioxide being absorbed by the ocean surface layer posed by bicarbonate chemistry. Essentially, in order to enter the ocean, carbon dioxide gas has to partition into one of the components of carbonic acid: carbonate ion, bicarbonate ion, or protonated carbonic acid, and the product of these many chemical dissociation constants factors into a kind of back-pressure that limits how fast the carbon dioxide can enter the surface ocean. Geology, geochemistry, atmospheric chemistry, ocean chemistry ... this amounted to one of the earliest examples of "integrated assessment", which 50 years later became an entire branch of global-warming science.

In the November 1982 Scientific American Letters to the Editors, Revelle stated: "We must conclude that until a warming trend that exceeds the noise level of natural climatic fluctuations becomes clearly evident, there will be considerable uncertainty and a diversity of opinions about the amplitude of the climatic effects of increased atmospheric CO_{2}. If the modelers are correct, such a signal should be detectable within the next 10 or 15 years."

=== UC San Diego ===
During the late 1950s, Revelle fought for the establishment of a University of California campus in San Diego. He had to contend with the UC Board of Regents, who would have preferred merely to expand the University of California, Los Angeles campus rather than create an entirely new campus in San Diego. He also came into conflict with San Diego politicians and businessmen who believed that the campus should be established closer to downtown, such as near San Diego State University or in Balboa Park. The decision to build the campus at La Jolla was made in 1959, and the first graduate students were enrolled in 1960, followed by the first undergraduates in 1964.

Revelle's struggle to acquire land for the new campus put him in competition with Jonas Salk, and Revelle lost some of what he called the "best piece of land we had" on UCSD's eventual Torrey Pines site to the fledgling Salk Institute. In later years Revelle continued to show some animosity toward Salk, once saying: "He is a folk hero, even though he is... not very bright."

When at Scripps and while building UCSD, Revelle also had to deal with a La Jolla community that refused to rent or sell property to Jews. In addition to battling the anti-semitic restrictive covenants of La Jolla real estate, Revelle helped found a new housing subdivision for Scripps professors, partially because some of them would not have been allowed to live in La Jolla.

Revelle's tactless approaches to these public battles earned him many enemies, who portrayed him to the Board of Regents as too "disorganized" to effectively lead UCSD. UC President Clark Kerr realized that Revelle was not a viable candidate to serve as the first chancellor of the new campus, and delivered the news to a "heartbroken" Revelle. In his memoirs, Kerr paraphrased Revelle's response: "He spoke of how he had walked the site of the prospective campus on moonlit nights visualizing what one day might rise there in all its splendor. I shared a few very sad moments with him." Instead of Revelle, Herbert York became the first chancellor of UCSD.

Revelle left Scripps in 1963 and founded the (now defunct) Center for Population Studies at Harvard University. In his over ten years there as its director, he focused upon the application of science and technology to the problem of world hunger. In 1976 he returned to UC San Diego as Professor of Science, Technology and Public Affairs (STPA) in the school's political science department.

=== Views on climate change distorted ===
In 1991, Revelle's name appeared as co-author on an article written by physicist S. Fred Singer and electrical engineer Chauncey Starr for the publication Cosmos: A Journal of Emerging Issues, titled "What to do about greenhouse warming: Look before you leap", which was published in the summer of 1992. The Cosmos article included the statement that "Drastic, precipitous—and, especially, unilateral—steps to delay the putative greenhouse impacts can cost jobs and prosperity and increase the human costs of global poverty, without being effective. Stringent economic controls now would be economically devastating particularly for developing countries...". The article concluded: "The scientific base for a greenhouse warming is too uncertain to justify drastic action at this time. There is little risk in delaying policy responses."

These particular statements and the bulk of the article, including the title, had been written and published a year earlier by S. Fred Singer as sole author. Singer's article stated that "there is every expectation that scientific understanding will be substantially improved within the next decade" and advocated against drastic and "hastily-conceived" action at the time without further scientific evidence. It does not, however, deny climate change or global warming.

Justin Lancaster, Revelle's graduate student and teaching assistant at the Scripps Institution of Oceanography from 1981 until Revelle's death, says that Revelle was "hoodwinked" by Singer into adding his name to the article and that Revelle was "intensely embarrassed that his name was associated" with it. In 1992, Lancaster charged that Singer's actions were "unethical" and specifically designed to undercut then–Senator Al Gore's global warming policy stance; however, to end a lawsuit brought by Singer against Lancaster with support of the Center for Public Interest in Washington, D.C., Lancaster gave Singer a statement of apology, but refused to agree that anything he said was false. In 2006, prompted by Robert Balling and others continuing to state that Revelle actually wrote the article, Lancaster formally withdrew his retraction and reiterated his charges.

When Gore was running for the vice-presidential nomination in 1992, The New Republic picked up on the contrast between the references to Revelle in Gore's book Earth in the Balance and the views in the Cosmos article that could now be attributed to Revelle. This was followed up by Newsweek and elsewhere in the media. Patrick Michaels boasted that the Cosmos article had been read into the Congressional Record. The issue was even raised by Admiral James Stockdale in the televised vice-presidential debate. Gore's response was to protest that Revelle's views in the article had been taken out of context.

Roger's daughter, Carolyn Revelle, wrote:

Contrary to George Will's "Al Gore's Green Guilt", Roger Revelle—our father and the "father" of the greenhouse effect—remained deeply concerned about global warming until his death in July 1991. That same year he wrote: "The scientific base for a greenhouse warming is too uncertain to justify drastic action at this time." Will and other critics of Sen. Al Gore have seized these words to suggest that Revelle, who was also Gore's professor and mentor, renounced his belief in global warming. Nothing could be further from the truth. When Revelle inveighed against "drastic" action, he was using that adjective in its literal sense—measures that would cost trillions of dollars. Up until his death, he thought that extreme measures were premature. But he continued to recommend immediate prudent steps to mitigate and delay climatic warming. Some of those steps go well beyond anything Gore or other national politicians have yet to advocate. [...] Revelle proposed a range of approaches to address global warming. Inaction was not one of them. He agreed with the adage "look before you leap", but he never said "sit on your hands".

=== Legacy ===
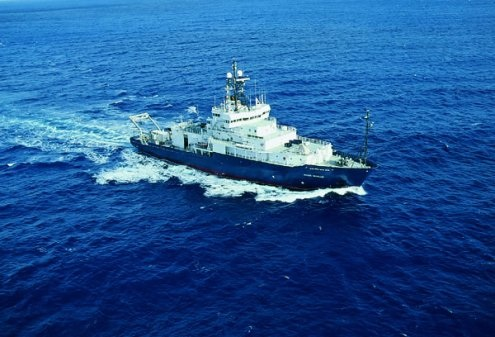
The RV Roger Revelle, named in his honor. It was put into service in 1996.

During his last decade at UCSD and SIO, Revelle continued to work and teach. In the early 1980s, he taught undergraduate STPA seminars twice a year, in Energy and Development (mainly on problems in Africa), the Carbon Dioxide Problem (known now as the Global Warming problem), and Marine Policy. In 1986 he won the Balzan Prize for Oceanography/Climatology. A 1990 heart attack forced him to move his course to the Scripps Institution from the Revelle College provost's office, where he continued to teach the Marine Policy program until his death the following year. In 1991, he was awarded the National Medal of Science by President George H. W. Bush (one of about 500 recipients in the 20th century). He remarked to a reporter: "I got it for being the grandfather of the greenhouse effect."

Revelle died in San Diego on July 15, 1991, from complications of cardiac arrest. He was survived by his wife, Ellen Clark Revelle (1910–2009), three daughters, Anne Shumway, Mary Paci, and Carolyn Revelle, and one son, William, as well as numerous grandchildren.

In his honor, a new research vessel at the Scripps Institution was named R/V Roger Revelle. Also, the Ocean Studies Board of the National Academies of Sciences, Engineering, and Medicine created the Roger Revelle Commemorative Lecture series in his honor in 1999 to highlight the important links between ocean science and public policy. Since 1992, the American Geophysical Union has annually awarded a prize in his honor, the Roger Revelle Medal, for outstanding contributions in atmospheric sciences, atmosphere-ocean coupling, atmosphere-land coupling, biogeochemical cycles, climate or related aspects of the Earth system.

== Awards and honors ==
- Elected to the United States National Academy of Sciences (1957)
- Elected to the American Academy of Arts and Sciences (1958)
- Elected to the American Philosophical Society (1960)
- Alexander Agassiz Medal (1963)
- William Bowie Medal (1968)
- Tyler Prize for Environmental Achievement (1984)
- Vannevar Bush Award (1984)
- Golden Plate Award of the American Academy of Achievement (1985)
- National Medal of Science (1990)

Academic offices
Preceded by Carl Eckart	Director of Scripps Institution of Oceanography; 1950 – 1964	Succeeded by William Nierenberg
