= Oceanic carbon cycle =

Ocean/atmosphere carbon exchange process

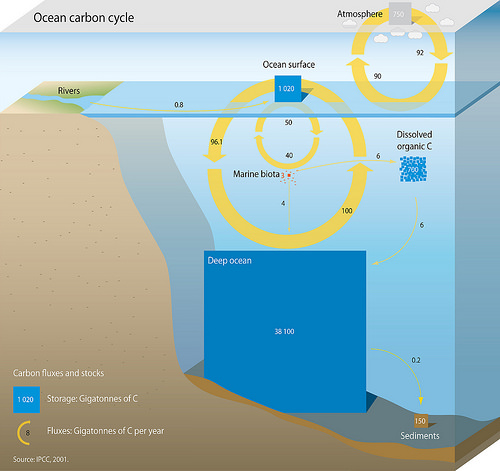
Oceanic carbon cycle (IPCC)

The oceanic carbon cycle (or marine carbon cycle) is composed of processes that exchange carbon between various pools within the ocean as well as between the atmosphere, Earth interior, and the seafloor. The carbon cycle is a result of many interacting forces across multiple time and space scales that circulates carbon around the planet, ensuring that carbon is available globally. The Oceanic carbon cycle is a central process to the global carbon cycle and contains both inorganic carbon (carbon not bound to other carbon) and organic carbon (carbon that is incorporated into molecules with carbon-carbon bonds). Part of the marine carbon cycle transforms carbon between non-living and living matter.

Three main processes (or pumps) that make up the marine carbon cycle bring atmospheric carbon dioxide (CO_{2}) into the ocean interior and distribute it through the oceans. These three pumps are: (1) the solubility pump, (2) the carbonate pump, and (3) the biological pump. The total active pool of carbon at the Earth's surface for durations of less than 10,000 years is roughly 40,000 gigatons C (Gt C, a gigaton is one billion tons, or the weight of approximately 6 million blue whales), and about 95% (~38,000 Gt C) is stored in the ocean, mostly as dissolved inorganic carbon. The speciation (the different forms of an element or compound) of dissolved inorganic carbon in the marine carbon cycle influences the water's alkalinity, and is therefore a primary controller of acid-base chemistry in the oceans.

Earth's plants and algae (primary producers) are responsible for the largest annual carbon fluxes. Although the amount of carbon stored in marine biota (~3 Gt C) is very small compared with terrestrial vegetation (~610 GtC), the amount of carbon exchanged (the flux) by these groups is nearly equal – about 50 GtC each. Marine organisms link the carbon and oxygen cycles through processes such as photosynthesis. The marine carbon cycle is also biologically tied to the nitrogen and phosphorus cycles by a near-constant stoichiometric ratio C:N:P of 106:16:1, also known as the Redfield Ketchum Richards (RKR) ratio, which states that organisms tend to take up nitrogen and phosphorus incorporating new organic carbon. Likewise, organic matter decomposed by bacteria releases phosphorus and nitrogen.

Based on the publications of NASA, World Meteorological Association, IPCC, and International Council for the Exploration of the Sea, as well as scientists from NOAA, Woods Hole Oceanographic Institution, Scripps Institution of Oceanography, CSIRO, and Oak Ridge National Laboratory, the human impacts on the marine carbon cycle are significant. Before the Industrial Revolution, the ocean was a net source of CO_{2} to the atmosphere whereas now the majority of the carbon that enters the ocean comes from atmospheric carbon dioxide (CO_{2}).

In recent decades, the ocean has acted as a sink for anthropogenic CO_{2}, absorbing around a quarter of the CO_{2} produced by humans through the burning of fossil fuels and land use changes. By doing so, the ocean has acted as a buffer, somewhat slowing the rise in atmospheric CO_{2} levels. However, this absorption of anthropogenic CO_{2} has also caused acidification of the oceans. Climate change, a result of this excess CO_{2} in the atmosphere, has increased the temperature of the ocean and atmosphere. The slowed rate of global warming occurring from 2000–2010 may be attributed to an observed increase in upper ocean heat content.

== Marine carbon ==
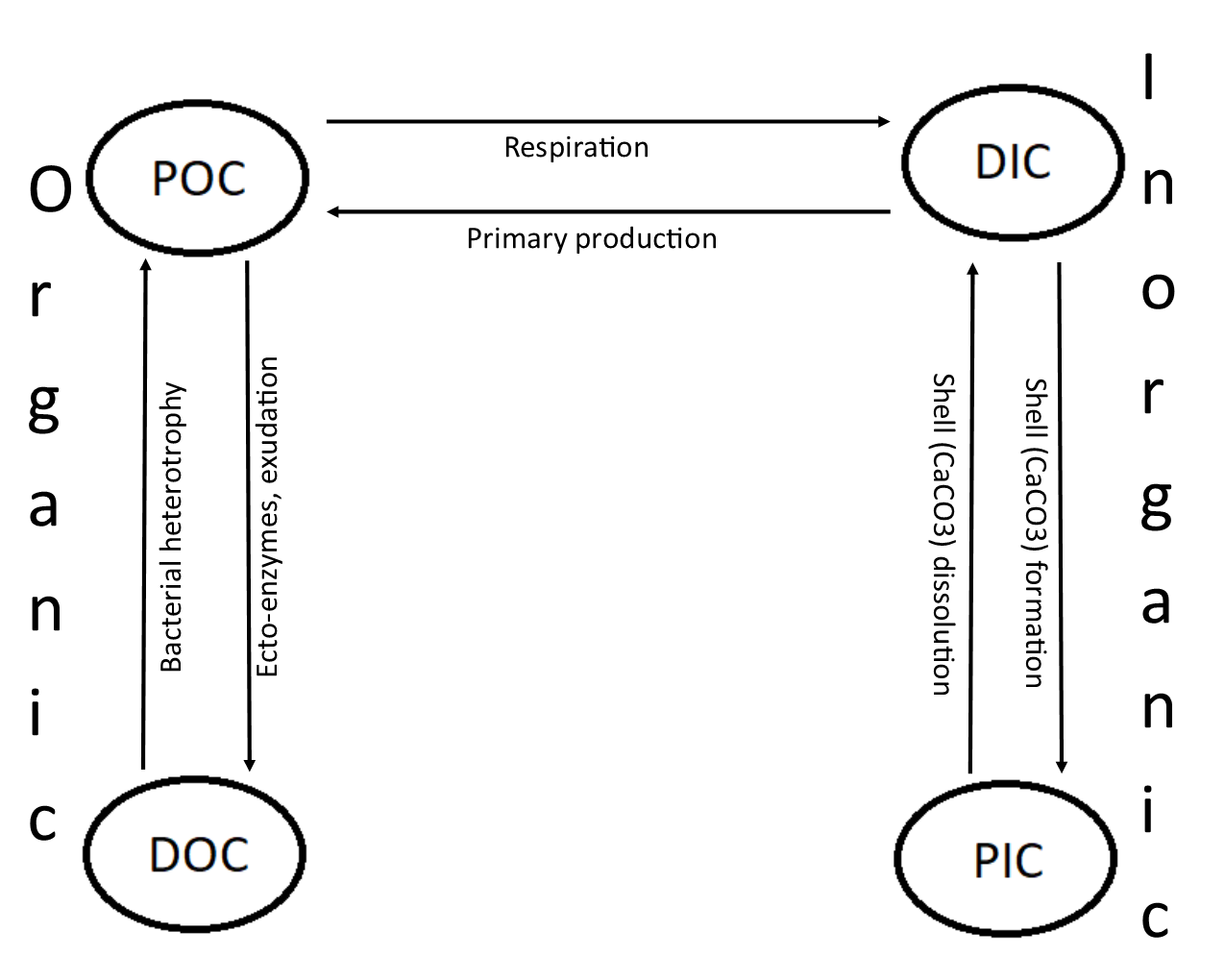
Carbon is separated into four distinct pools based on whether it is organic/inorganic and whether it is dissolved/particulate. The processes associated with each arrow describe the transformation associated with the transfer of carbon from one reservoir to another.

Carbon compounds can be distinguished as either organic or inorganic, and dissolved or particulate, depending on their composition. Organic carbon forms the backbone of key component of organic compounds such as – proteins, lipids, carbohydrates, and nucleic acids. Inorganic carbon is found primarily in simple compounds such as carbon dioxide, carbonic acid, bicarbonate, and carbonate (CO_{2}, H_{2}CO_{3}, HCO_{3}^{−}, CO_{3}^{2−} respectively).

Marine carbon is further separated into particulate and dissolved phases. These pools are operationally defined by physical separation – dissolved carbon passes through a 0.2 μm filter, and particulate carbon does not.

=== Inorganic carbon ===
There are two main types of inorganic carbon that are found in the oceans. Dissolved inorganic carbon (DIC) is made up of bicarbonate (HCO_{3}^{−}), carbonate (CO_{3}^{2−}) and carbon dioxide (including both dissolved CO_{2} and carbonic acid H_{2}CO_{3}). DIC can be converted to particulate inorganic carbon (PIC) through precipitation of CaCO_{3} (biologically or abiotically). DIC can also be converted to particulate organic carbon (POC) through photosynthesis and chemoautotrophy (i.e. primary production). DIC increases with depth as organic carbon particles sink and are respired. Free oxygen decreases as DIC increases because oxygen is consumed during aerobic respiration.

Particulate inorganic carbon (PIC) is the other form of inorganic carbon found in the ocean. Most PIC is the CaCO_{3} that makes up shells of various marine organisms, but can also form in whiting events. Marine fish also excrete calcium carbonate during osmoregulation.

Some of the inorganic carbon species in the ocean, such as bicarbonate and carbonate, are major contributors to alkalinity, a natural ocean buffer that prevents drastic changes in acidity (or pH). The marine carbon cycle also affects the reaction and dissolution rates of some chemical compounds, regulates the amount of carbon dioxide in the atmosphere and Earth's temperature.

=== Organic carbon ===
Like inorganic carbon, there are two main forms of organic carbon found in the ocean (dissolved and particulate). Dissolved organic carbon (DOC) is defined operationally as any organic molecule that can pass through a 0.2 μm filter. DOC can be converted into particulate organic carbon through heterotrophy and it can also be converted back to dissolved inorganic carbon (DIC) through respiration.

Those organic carbon molecules being captured on a filter are defined as particulate organic carbon (POC). POC is composed of organisms (dead or alive), their fecal matter, and detritus. POC can be converted to DOC through disaggregation of molecules and by exudation by phytoplankton, for example. POC is generally converted to DIC through heterotrophy and respiration.

== Marine carbon pumps ==
=== Solubility pump ===
Full article: Solubility pump

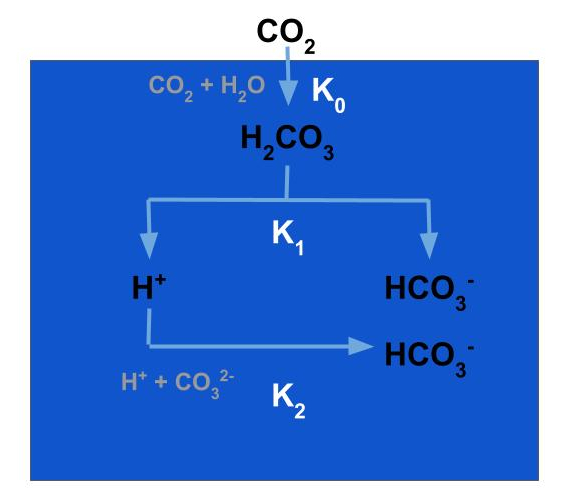
Dissociation of carbon dioxide following Henry's Law

The oceans store the largest pool of reactive carbon on the planet as DIC, which is introduced as a result of the dissolution of atmospheric carbon dioxide into seawater – the solubility pump. Aqueous CO_{2}, carbonic acid, bicarbonate ion, and carbonate ion concentrations comprise dissolved inorganic carbon (DIC). DIC circulates throughout the whole ocean by Thermohaline circulation, which facilitates the tremendous DIC storage capacity of the ocean. The chemical equations below show the reactions that CO_{2} undergoes after it enters the ocean and transforms into its aqueous form.

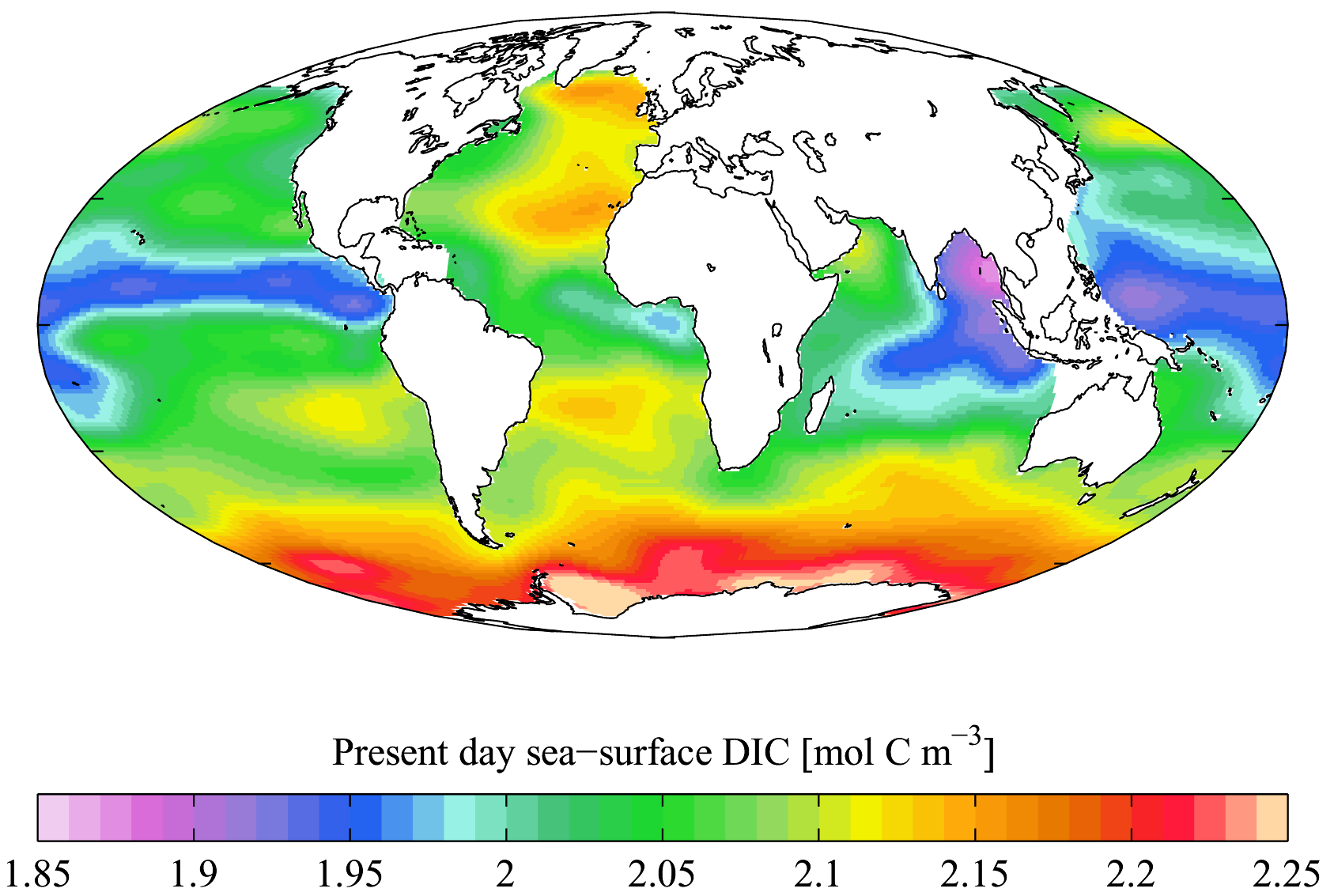
Sea surface dissolved inorganic carbon First, carbon dioxide reacts with water to form carbonic acid. concentration in the 1990s (from the GLODAP climatology)

CO_{2}(aq) + H_{2}O → H_{2}CO_{3} 1

Carbonic acid rapidly dissociates into free hydrogen ion (technically, hydronium) and bicarbonate.

H_{2}CO_{3} → H^{+} + HCO_{3}^{−} 2

The free hydrogen ion meets carbonate, already present in the water from the dissolution of CaCO_{3}, and reacts to form more bicarbonate ion.

H^{+} + CO_{3}^{2−} → HCO_{3}^{−} 3

The dissolved species in the equations above, mostly bicarbonate, make up the carbonate alkalinity system, the dominant contributor to seawater alkalinity.

=== Carbonate pump ===
The carbonate pump, sometimes called the carbonate counter pump, starts with marine organisms at the ocean's surface producing particulate inorganic carbon (PIC) in the form of calcium carbonate (calcite or aragonite, CaCO_{3}). This CaCO_{3} is what forms hard body parts like shells. The formation of these shells increases atmospheric CO_{2} due to the production of CaCO_{3} in the following reaction with simplified stoichiometry:

Ca^{2+} + 2HCO_{3}^{−} ↔ CaCO_{3} + CO_{2} + H_{2}O 4

Coccolithophores, a nearly ubiquitous group of phytoplankton that produce shells of calcium carbonate, are the dominant contributors to the carbonate pump. Due to their abundance, coccolithophores have significant implications on carbonate chemistry, in the surface waters they inhabit and in the ocean below: they provide a large mechanism for the downward transport of CaCO_{3}. The air-sea CO_{2} flux induced by a marine biological community can be determined by the rain ratio - the proportion of carbon from calcium carbonate compared to that from organic carbon in particulate matter sinking to the ocean floor, (PIC/POC). The carbonate pump acts as a negative feedback on CO_{2} taken into the ocean by the solubility pump. It occurs with lesser magnitude than the solubility pump.

=== Biological pump ===
Particulate organic carbon, created through biological production, can be exported from the upper ocean in a flux commonly termed the biological pump, or respired (equation 6) back into inorganic carbon. In the former, dissolved inorganic carbon is biologically converted into organic matter by photosynthesis (equation 5) and other forms of autotrophy that then sinks and is, in part or whole, digested by heterotrophs. Particulate organic carbon can be classified, based on how easily organisms can break them down for food, as labile, semilabile, or refractory. Photosynthesis by phytoplankton is the primary source for labile and semilabile molecules, and is the indirect source for most refractory molecules. Labile molecules are present at low concentrations outside of cells (in the picomolar range) and have half-lives of only minutes when free in the ocean. They are consumed by microbes within hours or days of production and reside in the surface oceans, where they contribute a majority of the labile carbon flux. Semilabile molecules, much more difficult to consume, are able to reach depths of hundreds of meters below the surface before being metabolized. Refractory DOM largely comprises highly conjugated molecules like Polycyclic aromatic hydrocarbons or lignin. Refractory DOM can reach depths greater than 1000 m and circulates through the oceans over thousands of years. Over the course of a year, approximately 20 gigatons of photosynthetically-fixed labile and semilabile carbon is taken up by heterotrophs, whereas fewer than 0.2 gigatons of refractory carbon is consumed. Marine dissolved organic matter (DOM) can store as much carbon as the current atmospheric CO_{2} supply, but industrial processes are altering the balance of this cycle.

$\ce{\underset{carbon~dioxide}{6CO2} + \underset{water}{6H2O} ->[\overset{}\text{light energy}] \underset{carbohydrate}{C6H12O6} + \underset{oxygen}{6O2}}$	5

$\ce{\underset{carbohydrate}{C6H12O6} + \underset{oxygen}{6O2} -> \underset{carbon~dioxide}{6CO2} + \underset{water}{6H2O} + heat}$	6

== Inputs ==
Inputs to the marine carbon cycle are numerous, but the primary contributions, on a net basis, come from the atmosphere and rivers. Hydrothermal vents generally supply carbon equal to the amount they consume.

=== Atmosphere ===
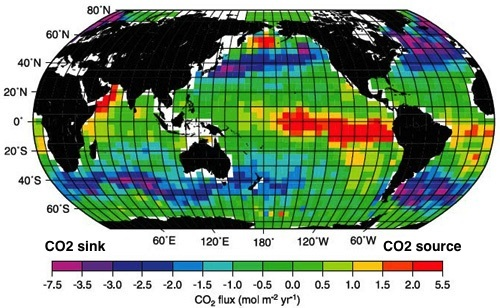
Global air-sea CO2 flux – IPCC 2007

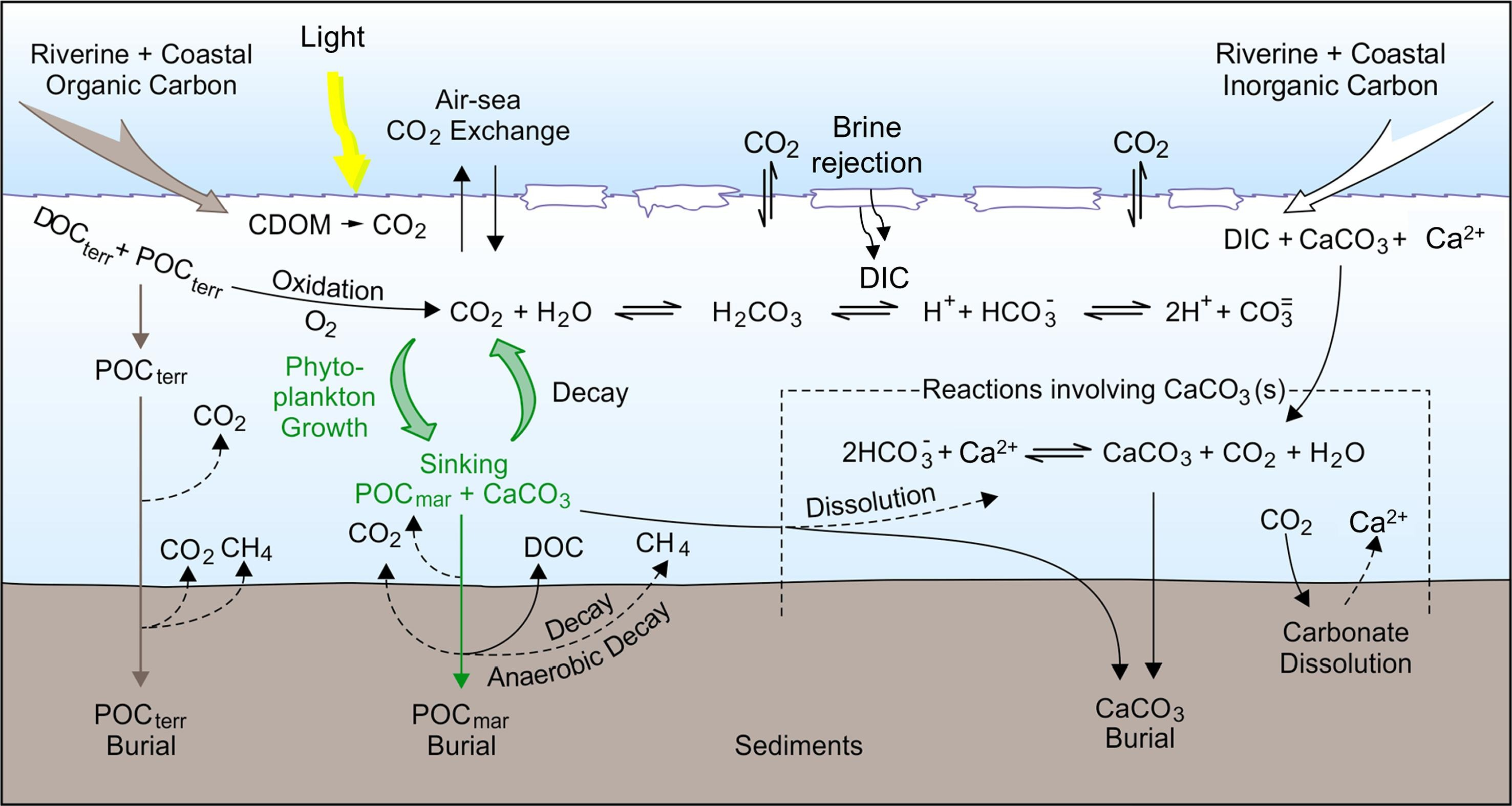
Carbon cycle processes in high-latitude shelf seas

Before the Industrial Revolution, the ocean was a source of CO_{2} to the atmosphere balancing the impact of rock weathering and terrestrial particulate organic carbon; now it has become a sink for the excess atmospheric CO_{2}. Carbon dioxide is absorbed from the atmosphere at the ocean's surface at an exchange rate which varies locally and with time but on average, the oceans have a net absorption of around 2.9 Pg (equivalent to 2.9 billion metric tonnes) of carbon from atmospheric CO_{2} per year. Because the solubility of carbon dioxide increases when temperature decreases, cold areas can contain more CO_{2} and still be in equilibrium with the atmosphere; In contrast, rising sea surface temperatures decrease the capacity of the oceans to take in carbon dioxide. The North Atlantic and Nordic oceans have the highest carbon uptake per unit area in the world, and in the North Atlantic deep convection transports approximately 197 Tg per year of non-refractory carbon to depth.

The rate of CO_{2} absorption by the ocean has been increasing with time as atmospheric CO_{2} concentrations have increased due to anthropogenic emissions. However, the ocean carbon sink may be more sensitive to climate change than previously thought, and ocean warming and circulation changes due to climate change could result in the ocean absorbing less CO_{2} from the atmosphere in future than expected.

==== Carbon dioxide exchange rates between ocean and atmosphere ====
Ocean-atmospheric exchanges rates of CO_{2} depend on the concentration of carbon dioxide already present in both the atmosphere and the ocean, temperature, salinity, and wind speed. This exchange rate can be approximated by Henry's law and can be calculated as S = kP, where the solubility (S) of the carbon dioxide gas is proportional to the amount of gas in the atmosphere, or its partial pressure.

==== Revelle factor ====
Since the oceanic intake of carbon dioxide is limited, CO_{2} influx can also be described by the Revelle factor. The Revelle Factor is a ratio of the change of carbon dioxide to the change in dissolved inorganic carbon, which serves as an indicator of carbon dioxide dissolution in the mixed layer considering the solubility pump. The Revelle Factor is an expression to characterize the thermodynamic efficiency of the DIC pool to absorb CO_{2} into bicarbonate. The lower the Revelle factor, the higher the capacity for ocean water to take in carbon dioxide. While Revelle calculated a factor of around 10 in his day, in a 2004 study data showed a Revelle factor ranging from approximately 9 in low-latitude tropical regions to 15 in the southern ocean near Antarctica.

=== Rivers ===
Rivers can also transport organic carbon to the ocean through weathering or erosion of aluminosilicate (equation 7) and carbonate rocks (equation 8) on land,

2 NaAlSi_{3}O_{8} + 2 H_{2}CO_{3} + 9 H_{2}O → 2 Na^{+} + 2 HCO_{3}^{−} + 4 H_{4}SiO_{4} + Al_{2}Si_{2}O_{5}(OH)_{4} 7

CaCO_{3} + H_{2}CO_{3} → Ca^{2+} + 2 HCO_{3}^{−} 8

or by the decomposition of life (equation 5, e.g. plant and soil material). Rivers contribute roughly equal amounts (~0.4 GtC/yr) of DIC and DOC to the oceans. It is estimated that approximately 0.8 GtC (DIC + DOC) is transported annually from the rivers to the ocean. The rivers that flow into Chesapeake Bay (Susquehanna, Potomac, and James rivers) input approximately 0.004 Gt (6.5 × 10^{10} moles) DIC per year. The total carbon transport of rivers represents approximately 0.02% of the total carbon in the atmosphere. Though it seems small, over long time scales (1000 to 10,000 years) the carbon that enters rivers (and therefore does not enter the atmosphere) serves as a stabilizing feedback for greenhouse warming.

== Outputs ==
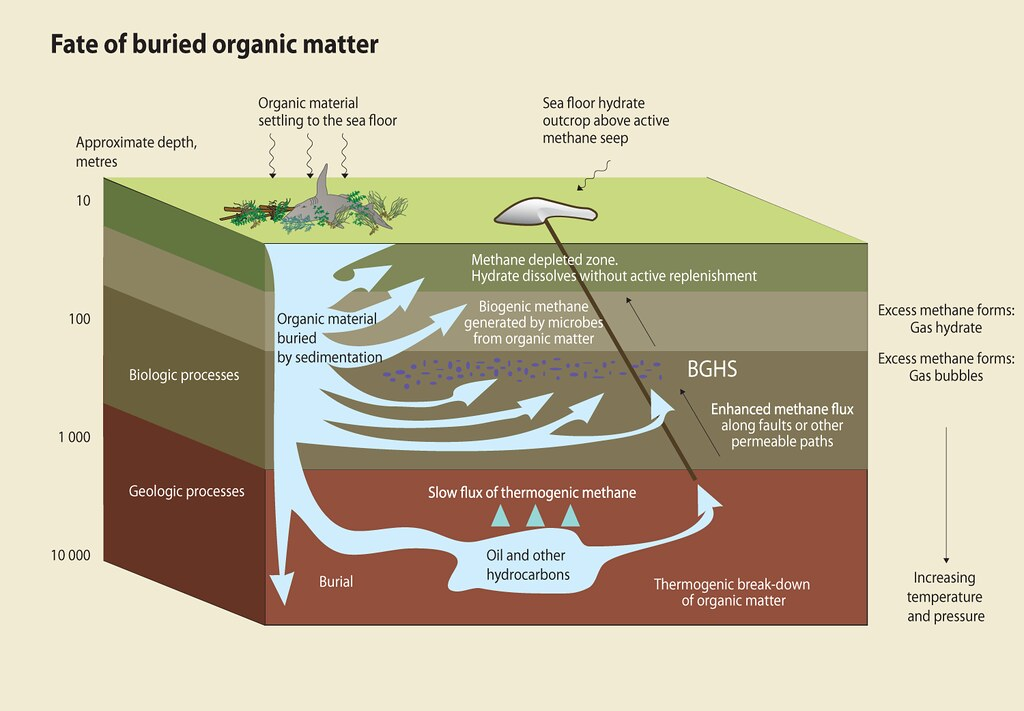
Fate of buried organic matter

The key outputs of the marine carbon system are particulate organic matter (POC) and calcium carbonate (PIC) preservation as well as reverse weathering. While there are regions with local loss of CO_{2} to the atmosphere and hydrothermal processes, a net loss in the cycle does not occur.

=== Organic matter preservation ===
Sedimentation is a long-term sink for carbon in the ocean, as well as the largest loss of carbon from the oceanic system. Deep marine sediments and geologic formations are important since they provide a thorough record of life on Earth and an important source of fossil fuel. Oceanic carbon can exit the system in the form of detritus that sinks and is buried in the seafloor without being fully decomposed or dissolved. Ocean floor surface sediments account for 1.75 × 10^{15} kg of carbon in the global carbon cycle. At most, 4% of the particulate organic carbon from the euphotic zone in the Pacific Ocean, where light-powered primary production occurs, is buried in marine sediments. It is then implied that since there is a higher input of organic matter to the ocean than what is being buried, a large portion of it is used up or consumed within.

==== Fate of sinking organic carbon ====
Historically, sediments with the highest organic carbon contents were frequently found in areas with high surface water productivity or those with low bottom-water oxygen concentrations. 90% of organic carbon burial occurs in deposits of deltas and continental shelves and upper slopes; this is due partly to short exposure time because of a shorter distance to the seafloor and the composition of the organic matter that is already deposited in those environments. Organic carbon burial is also sensitive to climate patterns: the accumulation rate of organic carbon was 50% larger during the glacial maximum compared to interglacials.

==== Degradation ====
POC is decomposed by a series of microbe-driven processes, such as methanogenesis and sulfate reduction, before burial in the seafloor. Degradation of POC also results in microbial methane production which is the main gas hydrate on the continental margins. Lignin and pollen are inherently resistant to degradation, and some studies show that inorganic matrices may also protect organic matter. Preservation rates of organic matter depend on other interdependent variables that vary nonlinearly in time and space. Although organic matter breakdown occurs rapidly in the presence of oxygen, microbes utilizing a variety of chemical species (via redox gradients) can degrade organic matter in anoxic sediments. The burial depth at which degradation halts depends upon the sedimentation rate, the relative abundance of organic matter in the sediment, the type of organic matter being buried, and innumerable other variables. While decomposition of organic matter can occur in anoxic sediments when bacteria use oxidants other than oxygen (nitrate, sulfate, Fe^{3+}), decomposition tends to end short of complete mineralization. This occurs because of preferential decomposition of labile molecules over refractile molecules.

==== Burial ====
Organic carbon burial is an input of energy for underground biological environments and can regulate oxygen in the atmosphere at long time-scales (> 10,000 years). Burial can only take place if organic carbon arrives to the sea floor, making continental shelves and coastal margins the main storage of organic carbon from terrestrial and oceanic primary production. Fjords, or cliffs created by glacial erosion, have also been identified as areas of significant carbon burial, with rates one hundred times greater than the ocean average. Particulate organic carbon is buried in oceanic sediments, creating a pathway between a rapidly available carbon pool in the ocean to its storage for geological timescales. Once carbon is sequestered in the seafloor, it is considered blue carbon. Burial rates can be calculated as the difference between the rate at which organic matter sinks and the rate at which it decomposes.

=== Calcium carbonate preservation ===
The precipitation of calcium carbonate is important as it results in a loss of alkalinity as well as a release of CO_{2} (Equation 4), and therefore a change in the rate of preservation of calcium carbonate can alter the partial pressure of CO_{2} in Earth's atmosphere. CaCO_{3} is supersatured in the great majority of ocean surface waters and undersaturated at depth, meaning the shells are more likely to dissolve as they sink to ocean depths. CaCO_{3} can also be dissolved through metabolic dissolution (i.e. can be used as food and excreted) and thus deep ocean sediments have very little calcium carbonate. The precipitation and burial of calcium carbonate in the ocean removes particulate inorganic carbon from the ocean and ultimately forms limestone. On time scales greater than 500,000 years Earth's climate is moderated by the flux of carbon in and out of the lithosphere. Rocks formed in the ocean seafloor are recycled through plate tectonics back to the surface and weathered or subducted into the mantle, the carbon outgassed by volcanoes.

== Human impacts ==
Oceans take up around 25 – 31% of anthropogenic CO_{2}. Because the Revelle factor increases with increasing CO_{2}, a smaller fraction of the anthropogenic flux will be taken up by the ocean in the future. Current annual increase in atmospheric CO_{2} is approximately 4–5 gigatons of carbon, about 2–3ppm CO_{2} per year. This induces climate change that drives carbon concentration and carbon-climate feedback processes that modifies ocean circulation and the physical and chemical properties of seawater, which alters CO_{2} uptake. Overfishing and the plastic pollution of the oceans contribute to the degraded state of the world's biggest carbon sink.

=== Ocean acidification ===
Full article: Ocean acidification

The pH of the oceans is declining due to uptake of atmospheric CO_{2}. The rise in dissolved carbon dioxide reduces the availability of the carbonate ion, reducing CaCO_{3} saturation state, thus making it thermodynamically harder to make CaCO_{3} shell. Carbonate ions preferentially bind to hydrogen ions to form bicarbonate, thus a reduction in carbonate ion availability increases the amount of unbound hydrogen ions, and decreases the amount of bicarbonate formed (Equations 1–3). pH is a measurement of hydrogen ion concentration, where a low pH means there are more unbound hydrogen ions. pH is therefore an indicator of carbonate speciation (the format of carbon present) in the oceans and can be used to assess how healthy the ocean is.

The list of organisms that may struggle due to ocean acidification include coccolithophores and foraminifera (the base of the marine food chain in many areas), human food sources such as oysters and mussels, and perhaps the most conspicuous, a structure built by organisms – the coral reefs. Most surface water will remain supersaturated with respect to CaCO_{3} (both calcite and aragonite) for some time on current emissions trajectories, but the organisms that require carbonate will likely be replaced in many areas. Coral reefs are under pressure from overfishing, nitrate pollution, and warming waters; ocean acidification will add additional stress on these important structures.

=== Iron fertilization ===
Full article: Iron Fertilization

Iron fertilization is a facet of geoengineering, which purposefully manipulates the Earth's climate system, typically in aspects of the carbon cycle or radiative forcing. Of current geoengineering interest is the possibility of accelerating the biological pump to increase export of carbon from the surface ocean. This increased export could theoretically remove excess carbon dioxide from the atmosphere for storage in the deep ocean. Ongoing investigations regarding artificial fertilization exist. Due to the scale of the ocean and the fast response times of heterotrophic communities to increases in primary production, it is difficult to determine whether limiting-nutrient fertilization results in an increase in carbon export. However, the majority of the community does not believe this is a reasonable or viable approach.

=== Dams and reservoirs ===
There are over 16 million dams in the world that alter carbon transport from rivers to oceans. Using data from the Global Reservoirs and Dams database, which contains approximately 7000 reservoirs that hold 77% of the total volume of water held back by dams (8000 km^{3}), it is estimated that the delivery of carbon to the ocean has decreased by 13% since 1970 and is projected to reach 19% by 2030. The excess carbon contained in the reservoirs may emit an additional ~0.184 Gt of carbon to the atmosphere per year and an additional ~0.2 GtC will be buried in sediment. Prior to 2000, the Mississippi, the Niger, and the Ganges River basins account for 25 – 31% of all reservoir carbon burial. After 2000, the Paraná (home to 70 dams) and the Zambezi (home to the largest reservoir) River basins exceeded the burial by the Mississippi. Other large contributors to carbon burial caused by damming occur on the Danube, the Amazon, the Yangtze, the Mekong, the Yenisei, and the Tocantins Rivers.

== See also ==
- Phosphorus cycle
