= Revelle factor =

Unit of measure used in oceanography

The Revelle factor (buffer factor) is the ratio of instantaneous change in carbon dioxide (CO_{2}) to the change in total dissolved inorganic carbon (DIC), and is a measure of the resistance to atmospheric CO_{2} being absorbed by the ocean surface layer. The buffer factor is used to examine the distribution of CO_{2} between the atmosphere and the ocean, and measures the amount of CO_{2} that can be dissolved in the mixed surface layer. It is named after the oceanographer Roger Revelle. The Revelle factor describes the ocean's ability to uptake atmospheric CO_{2}, and is typically referenced in global carbon budget analysis and anthropogenic climate change studies.

Revelle factor = Δ[CO_{2}]/ [CO_{2}] / Δ[DIC]/[DIC] where Δ[CO_{2}] / [CO_{2}] is the instantaneous change in pCO_{2} and Δ[DIC] / [DIC] is the instantaneous change in dissolved inorganic carbon at the oceans surface.

== Thermodynamics ==
In order to enter the ocean, carbon dioxide gas has to partition into one of the components of carbonic acid: carbonate ion, bicarbonate ion, or protonated carbonic acid, and the product of these many chemical dissociation constants factors into a "back-pressure" that limits how fast the carbon dioxide can enter the surface ocean.

== DIC ==
The species of DIC present in ocean waters are dependent on the pH of the system, and are illustrated by the Bjerrum plot below (Figure 1). Carbonate is dominant in higher pH (basic) environments, whereas carbon dioxide is dominant in lower pH (acidic) environments. Bicarbonate ions are abundant in relatively mid-pH waters. As the pH decreases, most of the DIC will be present as CO_{2} and hence increases its partial pressure (pCO_{2}), and the buffer factor will increase. An increased buffer factor results in a decreased buffering effect, which could lead to the uptake of more CO_{2} from the atmosphere, and decreasing the pH even more.

Figure 1: Curves illustrating the molar fraction of carbonate species present in seawater across pH, with salinity set at 5,000ppm, and temperature set to 25 degrees Celsius. Note temperature and salinity affect carbonate species present, and vary with location and season.

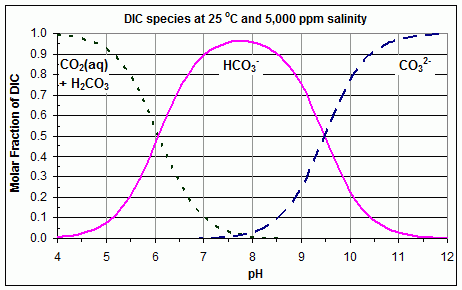

DIC and alkalinity govern carbonate and acid-base chemistry in the world's oceans, and their effects on the Revelle factor is no exception. The ratio of DIC to total alkalinity, and the changes in pCO_{2} are the main cause of Revelle Factor variability. Higher levels of DIC result in a lower Revelle factor, and consequently a larger buffering effect. Higher levels of pCO_{2} results in a higher Revelle factor, a positive feedback loop, and consequently a smaller buffering effect. Typically, the buffer factor ranges between 8 and 13.

== Anthropogenic CO_{2} ==
The capacity of the ocean waters to take up surplus (anthropogenic) CO_{2} is inversely proportional to the value of the Revelle factor. Hence, in modern-day oceans, it is possible to see the concentrations of anthropogenic CO_{2} by measuring the Revelle factor; the lower the Revelle factor, the greater the amount of anthropogenic CO_{2}. Low Revelle factors are typically found in the warmer tropical to subtropical waters, whereas higher Revelle factors are found in the colder high latitude waters of the North Atlantic. The North Pacific has higher Revelle factors, and has lower anthropogenic CO_{2}. This is due to the fact that the alkalinity values in the North Pacific are as much as 100μmol/kg lower than those in the North Atlantic.

== The Revelle effect ==
The Revelle effect describes how only a small fraction of pCO_{2} is present in ocean water when much larger amounts are added to the atmosphere. Depending on the alkalinity of the water, DIC is either present as CO_{3}, HCO_{3}, or CO_{2}. When the pH is high (basic) the buffering effect is greatest, causing much of the DIC to exist as HCO_{3} or CO_{3}, and not CO_{2}. So, the greater the buffering effect (low Revelle Factor) the more DIC occurs as CO_{3} or HCO_{3}, effectively lowering the pCO_{2} levels in both the atmosphere and ocean.

== See also ==
- Alkalinity
- Solubility pump
