= Gaston Charlot =

French chemist

Gaston Charlot (English: /ʃɑːrˈloʊ/ shar-LOH, French: [ɡastɔ̃ ʃaʁlo]; 11 June 1904 – 17 April 1994) was a French chemist, founder of modern analytical chemistry in France.

Charlot graduated from the École supérieure de physique et de chimie industrielles de la ville de Paris; he worked on the catalytic oxidation of organic substances in the gas phase. In 1945, he became professor of analytical chemistry at the École supérieure, and also lectured at the Faculté des sciences de Paris and at the Institut national des sciences et techniques nucléaires.

Charlot generalized the Brønsted–Lowry theory of acid-base chemistry to complex chemistry. In 1943, he published Théories et méthodes nouvelles d'analyse qualitative (New theories and methods of qualitative analysis), which eliminated traditional methods such as hydrogen sulfide tests by replacing them with electrochemical or colorimetric tests, complex chemistry, and non-aqueous chemical reactions. After some reluctance from part of the chemistry community, the Charlot method found approval after the first European post-war analytical chemistry congress, held in Utrecht in 1948.

Gaston Charlot was the author of many reference works in analytical chemistry, including his Cours de chimie analytique générale and Les réactions chimiques en solution aqueuse. He was elected member of the French Academy of Sciences in 1970 and knight of the Légion d'honneur.

== See also ==
- Charlot equation
