= Bjerrum plot =

Graph of polyprotic acid concentration as a function of pH

Example Bjerrum plot: Change in carbonate system of seawater from ocean acidification.

A Bjerrum plot (named after Niels Bjerrum), sometimes also known as a Sillén diagram (after Lars Gunnar Sillén), or a Hägg diagram (after Gunnar Hägg) is a graph of the concentrations of the different species of a polyprotic acid in a solution, as a function of pH, when the solution is at equilibrium. Due to the many orders of magnitude spanned by the concentrations, they are commonly plotted on a logarithmic scale. Sometimes the ratios of the concentrations are plotted rather than the actual concentrations. Occasionally H^{+} and OH^{−} are also plotted.

Most often, the carbonate system is plotted, where the polyprotic acid is carbonic acid (a diprotic acid), and the different species are dissolved carbon dioxide, carbonic acid, bicarbonate, and carbonate. In acidic conditions, the dominant form is CO_{2}; in basic (alkaline) conditions, the dominant form is CO^{2−}_{3}; and in between, the dominant form is HCO^{−}_{3}. At every pH, the concentration of carbonic acid is assumed to be negligible compared to the concentration of dissolved CO_{2}, and so is often omitted from Bjerrum plots. These plots are very helpful in solution chemistry and natural water chemistry. In the example given here, it illustrates the response of seawater pH and carbonate speciation due to the input of man-made CO_{2} emission by the fossil fuel combustion.

The Bjerrum plots for other polyprotic acids, including silicic, boric, sulfuric and phosphoric acids, are other commonly used examples.

== Bjerrum plot equations for carbonate system ==
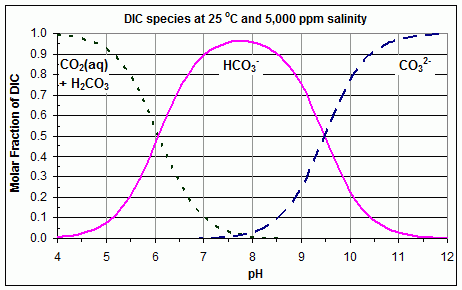

If carbon dioxide, carbonic acid, hydrogen ions, bicarbonate and carbonate are all dissolved in water, and at chemical equilibrium, their equilibrium concentrations are often assumed to be given by:

$$\begin{align}[]
\left[\textrm{CO}_2\right]_\text{eq} &= \frac{\left[\textrm{H}^+\right]_\text{eq}^2}{\left[\textrm{H}^+\right]_\text{eq}^2 + K_1\left[\textrm{H}^+\right]_\text{eq} + K_1 K_2} \times \textrm{DIC}, \\[3pt]
\left[\textrm{HCO}_3^-\right]_\text{eq} &= \frac{K_1\left[\textrm{H}^+\right]_\text{eq}}{\left[\textrm{H}^+\right]_\text{eq}^2 + K_1\left[\textrm{H}^+\right]_\text{eq} + K_1 K_2} \times \textrm{DIC}, \\[3pt]
\left[\textrm{CO}_3^{2-}\right]_\text{eq} &= \frac{K_1 K_2}{\left[\textrm{H}^+\right]_\text{eq}^2 + K_1\left[\textrm{H}^+\right]_\text{eq} + K_1 K_2} \times \textrm{DIC},
\end{align}$$

where the subscript 'eq' denotes that these are equilibrium concentrations, K_{1} is the equilibrium constant for the reaction CO_{2} + H_{2}O ⇌ H^{+} + HCO^{−}_{3} (i.e. the first acid dissociation constant for carbonic acid), K_{2} is the equilibrium constant for the reaction HCO^{−}_{3} ⇌ H^{+} + CO^{2−}_{3} (i.e. the second acid dissociation constant for carbonic acid), and DIC is the (unchanging) total concentration of dissolved inorganic carbon in the system, i.e. [CO_{2}] + [HCO^{−}_{3}] + [CO^{2−}_{3}]. K_{1}, K_{2} and DIC each have units of a concentration, e.g. mol/L.

A Bjerrum plot is obtained by using these three equations to plot these three species against pH = −log_{10} [H^{+}]_{eq}, for given K_{1}, K_{2} and DIC. The fractions in these equations give the three species' relative proportions, and so if DIC is unknown, or the actual concentrations are unimportant, these proportions may be plotted instead.

These three equations show that the curves for CO_{2} and HCO^{−}_{3} intersect at [H^{+}]_{eq} = K_{1}, and the curves for HCO^{−}_{3} and CO^{2−}_{3} intersect at [H^{+}]_{eq} = K_{2}. Therefore, the values of K_{1} and K_{2} that were used to create a given Bjerrum plot can easily be found from that plot, by reading off the concentrations at these points of intersection. An example with linear Y axis is shown in the accompanying graph. The values of K_{1} and K_{2}, and therefore the curves in the Bjerrum plot, vary substantially with temperature and salinity.

== Chemical and mathematical derivation of Bjerrum plot equations for carbonate system ==
Suppose that the reactions between carbon dioxide, hydrogen ions, bicarbonate and carbonate ions, all dissolved in water, are as follows:

CO_{2} + H_{2}O ⇌ H^{+} + HCO^{−}_{3}	1

HCO^{−}_{3} ⇌ H^{+} + CO^{2−}_{3}	2

Note that reaction 1 is actually the combination of two elementary reactions:

CO_{2} + H_{2}O ⇌ H_{2}CO_{3} ⇌ H^{+} + HCO^{−}_{3}

Assuming the mass action law applies to these two reactions, that water is abundant, and that the different chemical species are always well-mixed, their rate equations are

$$\begin{align}
\frac{\textrm{d}\left[\textrm{CO}_2\right]}{\textrm{d}t} &= -k_1\left[\textrm{CO}_2\right] + k_{-1}\left[\textrm{H}^+\right]\left[\textrm{HCO}_3^-\right], \\
\frac{\textrm{d}\left[\textrm{H}^+\right]}{\textrm{d}t} &= k_1\left[\textrm{CO}_2\right] - k_{-1}\left[\textrm{H}^+\right]\left[\textrm{HCO}_3^-\right] + k_2\left[\textrm{HCO}_3^-\right] - k_{-2}\left[\textrm{H}^+\right]\left[\textrm{CO}_3^{2-}\right], \\
\frac{\textrm{d}\left[\textrm{HCO}_3^-\right]}{\textrm{d}t} &= k_1\left[\textrm{CO}_2\right] - k_{-1}\left[\textrm{H}^+\right]\left[\textrm{HCO}_3^-\right] - k_2\left[\textrm{HCO}_3^-\right] + k_{-2}\left[\textrm{H}^+\right]\left[\textrm{CO}_3^{2-}\right], \\
\frac{\textrm{d}\left[\textrm{CO}_3^{2-}\right]}{\textrm{d}t} &= k_2\left[\textrm{HCO}_3^-\right] - k_{-2}\left[\textrm{H}^+\right]\left[\textrm{CO}_3^{2-}\right]
\end{align}$$

where [ ] denotes concentration, t is time, and K_{1} and k_{−1} are appropriate proportionality constants for reaction 1, called respectively the forwards and reverse rate constants for this reaction. (Similarly K_{2} and k_{−2} for reaction 2.)

At any equilibrium, the concentrations are unchanging, hence the left hand sides of these equations are zero. Then, from the first of these four equations, the ratio of reaction 1's rate constants equals the ratio of its equilibrium concentrations, and this ratio, called K_{1}, is called the equilibrium constant for reaction 1, i.e.

$K_1 = \frac{k_1}{k_{-1}} = \frac{[\textrm{H}^+]_\text{eq}[\textrm{HCO}_3^-]_\text{eq}}{[\textrm{CO}_2]_\text{eq}}$	3

where the subscript 'eq' denotes that these are equilibrium concentrations.

Similarly, from the fourth equation for the equilibrium constant K_{2} for reaction 2,

$K_2 = \frac{k_2}{k_{-2}} = \frac{\left[\textrm{H}^+\right]_\text{eq}\left[\textrm{CO}_3^{2-}\right]_\text{eq}}{\left[\textrm{HCO}_3^-\right]_\text{eq}}$	4

Rearranging 3 gives

$\left[\textrm{HCO}_3^-\right]_\text{eq} = \frac{K_1\left[\textrm{CO}_2\right]_\text{eq}}{\left[\textrm{H}^+\right]_\text{eq}}$	5

and rearranging 4, then substituting in 5, gives

$\left[\textrm{CO}_3^{2-}\right]_\text{eq} = \frac{K_2\left[\textrm{HCO}_3^-\right]_\text{eq}}{\left[\textrm{H}^+\right]_\text{eq}} = \frac{K_1 K_2\left[\textrm{CO}_2\right]_\text{eq}}{\left[\textrm{H}^+\right]_\text{eq}^2}$	6

The total concentration of dissolved inorganic carbon in the system is given by substituting in 5 and 6:

$$\begin{align}
\textrm{DIC}
&= \left[\textrm{CO}_2\right] + \left[\textrm{HCO}_3^-\right] + \left[\textrm{CO}_3^{2-}\right] \\
&= \left[\textrm{CO}_2\right]_\text{eq} \left(1 + \frac{K_1}{\left[\textrm{H}^+\right]_\text{eq}} + \frac{K_1 K_2}{\left[\textrm{H}^+\right]_\text{eq}^2}\right) \\
&= \left[\textrm{CO}_2\right]_\text{eq} \left(\frac{\left[\textrm{H}^+\right]_\text{eq}^2 + K_1\left[\textrm{H}^+\right]_\text{eq} + K_1K_2}{\left[\textrm{H}^+\right]_\text{eq}^2}\right)
\end{align}$$

Re-arranging this gives the equation for CO_{2}:

$$\left[\textrm{CO}_2\right]_\text{eq} = \frac{\left[\textrm{H}^+\right]_\text{eq}^2}{\left[\textrm{H}^+\right]_\text{eq}^2 + K_1\left[\textrm{H}^+\right]_\text{eq} + K_1 K_2} \times \textrm{DIC}$$

The equations for HCO^{−}_{3} and CO^{2−}_{3} are obtained by substituting this into 5 and 6.

== See also ==
- Charlot equation
- Gran plot (also known as Gran titration or the Gran method)
- Henderson–Hasselbalch equation
- Hill equation (biochemistry)
- Ion speciation
- Fresh water
- Seawater
- Thermohaline circulation
