= Charlot equation =

Equation used to calculate the pH of a weak acid or base solution

The Charlot equation (English: /ʃɑːrˈloʊ/ shar-LOH, French: [ʃaʁlo]), named after Gaston Charlot, is used in analytical chemistry to relate the hydrogen ion concentration, and therefore the pH, with the formal analytical concentration of an acid and its conjugate base. It can be used for computing the pH of buffer solutions when the approximations of the Henderson–Hasselbalch equation break down. The Henderson–Hasselbalch equation assumes that the autoionization of water is negligible and that the dissociation or hydrolysis of the acid and the base in solution are negligible (in other words, that the formal concentration is the same as the equilibrium concentration).

For an acid-base equilibrium such as HA ⇌ H^{+} + A^{−}, the Charlot equation may be written as

$$\mathrm{[H^+]} = K_a \frac{c_a - \Delta}{c_b + \Delta}$$

where [H^{+}] is the equilibrium concentration of H^{+}, K_{a} is the acid dissociation constant, C_{a} and C_{b} are the analytical concentrations of the acid and its conjugate base, respectively, and Δ = [H^{+}] − [OH^{−}]. The equation can be solved for [H^{+}] by using the autoionization constant for water, K_{w}, to introduce [OH^{−}] = K_{w}/[H^{+}]. This results in the following cubic equation for [H^{+}], which can be solved either numerically or analytically:

$$\mathrm{[H^+]^3} + (K_a + C_b)\mathrm{[H^+]^2} - (K_w + K_a C_a)\mathrm{[H^+]} - K_a K_w = 0$$

The solution to this equation may also be given in explicit form, although this is inconvenient to use

$$\begin{alignat}{2} \mathrm {[H^+]} ={}& \frac{2}{3} \sqrt{(K_a-C_b)^2+(3C_a+4C_b)K_a+3K_w)} \cdot {} \\& \cos \left(\frac{1}{3}\arccos \frac {\bigl(K_a+C_b\bigr)\bigl(18K_w-2(K_a+C_b)^2-9C_aK_a\bigr)-27C_bK_w} {2\bigl((K_a-C_b)^2+(3C_a+4C_b)K_a+3K_w\bigr)^{\frac{3}{2}}} \right)-\frac{K_a+C_b}{3}\end{alignat}$$

== Derivation ==
Considering the dissociation of the weak acid HA (e.g., acetic acid):

HA ⇌ H^{+} + A^{−}

Starting from the definition of the equilibrium constant

$$K_a = \mathrm{\frac{[H^+][A^-]}{[HA]}}$$

one can solve for [H^{+}] as follows:

$$\mathrm{[H^+] = \mathit{K_a} \frac{[HA]}{[A^-]}}$$

The main issue is how to determine the equilibrium concentrations [HA] and [A^{−}] from the initial, or analytical concentrations C_{a} and C_{b}. This can be achieved by considering the electroneutrality and mass balance constraints on the system. The first constraint is that the total concentration of cations needs to equal the total concentration of anions, because the system has to be electrically neutral:

$$\mathrm{[M^+] + [H^+] = [A^-] + [OH^-]}$$

Here M^{+} is the counterion that comes with the conjugate base, [A^{−}], that is added to the solution. For example, if HA is acetic acid, A^{−} would be acetate, which could be added to the solution in the form of sodium acetate. In this case, M^{+} would be the sodium cation. The equilibrium concentration [M^{+}] is constant and equal to the analytical concentration of the base, C_{b}. Therefore,

$$\mathrm{[A^-] = \mathit{C_b} + [H^+] - [OH^-]} = C_b + \Delta$$

Because of mass balance, the sum of the equilibrium concentrations of the acid and its conjugate base has to remain equal to the sum of their analytical concentrations. (HA may convert into A^{−} and vice versa, but what is lost of HA is gained of A^{−}, keeping the sum constant.)

$$\mathrm{[HA] + [A^-]} = C_a + C_b$$

Substituting [A^{−}] and solving for [HA]:

$$\mathrm{[HA]} = C_a - \Delta$$

Introducing the equations for [HA] and [A^{−}] into the equation for [H^{+}] yields the Charlot equation.

== See also ==
- Bjerrum plot
