= Sea ice brine pocket =

Salt water trapped in sea ice

A sea ice brine pocket is an area of fluid sea water with a high salt concentration trapped in sea ice as it freezes. Due to the nature of their formation, brine pockets are most commonly found in areas below −2 °C (28 °F), where it is sufficiently cold for seawater to freeze and form sea ice. Though the high salinity and low light conditions of brine pockets create a challenging environment for marine mammals, brine pockets serve as a habitat for various microbes. Sampling and studying these pockets requires specialized equipment to accommodate the hypersaline conditions and subzero temperatures.

== Formation ==
Brine pockets and channels are formed as seawater freezes, through a process called brine rejection. When sea ice forms, the water molecules form ice crystals, which have a regular lattice structure. The larger salt (NaCl) molecules in the sea water cannot be incorporated into this lattice, resulting in the salt being rejected from the sea ice. As seawater freezes and more pure water ice forms, the salt becomes more highly concentrated in the remaining sea water, forming a brine. As the brine salinity increases it becomes more dense compared to the surrounding sea ice, and the brine sinks downward through the ice, forming brine pockets. As the brine pockets form, they begin to coalesce, forming pockets of dense and saline brine. As these larger pockets of brine become interconnected, the may form a network of brine channels within the ice.

== Analysis of structure ==
The internal structure of sea ice can be analyzed using scanning electron microscopy and water-soluble resin. Brine can be drained from the sea ice using centrifugation at sufficiently cold temperatures to prevent melting and to maintain the structural integrity of the sea ice sample. Water-soluble resin is then injected to fill the brine pockets and channels and subsequently polymerized under ultraviolet light at around −12 °C (10 °F). The ice is sublimated by freeze drying, freeing the hardened casts, which can be examined using scanning electron microscopes to determine the structure of the brine pockets and channels and the volume of habitable space available to microbes.

== Abiotic conditions ==
=== Variability ===
Sea ice brine pockets create diverse and unique microecosystems, with abiotic factors such as chemical composition and physical conditions varying from one pocket to the next. Snow cover and temperature play the most significant role in influencing the variation of conditions present in brine pockets and channels. Sea ice brine pockets in general are extreme environments, due to their subzero temperatures and high salinities, but they harbor a diverse ecosystem of microbial life. Conditions within a brine pocket can vary drastically in a short time with a heavy snowfall or sudden temperature change, which means that microbial life within brine pockets must be flexible to environmental change.

=== Hypersaline environment ===
As sea ice forms, the water freezes into a lattice structure; this process ejects many of the salts and microbes from the ice, concentrating them in the remaining water. This high-salinity seawater is known as brine, and as more salts accumulate within the brine pockets, the remaining brine becomes more resistant to freezing. This accumulation of salts, producing a liquid environment that can remain liquid in subzero temperatures, provides a harsh-but-suitable environment for microorganisms to survive. These brine pockets maintain a very saline environment, have high concentrations of other dissolved minerals, and have a high density of microbial life. Brine salinity and concentration are directly dependent on the air temperature of the surrounding environment; as temperatures decrease, more salts become rejected from newly-formed ice, causing more salts to accumulate within the brine, and brine pockets decrease in size. This results in a hypersaline environment with dissolved salt contents which can reach up to 200 g/kg, in contrast to open seawater which has a salinity of 33-37 g/kg.

=== Light limitation ===
Brine pockets can form deep within sea ice where there is very low irradiance. Since snow and ice block and reflect incoming light, with deeper brine pockets experience more light limitation than shallower brine pockets. When salts in seawater become rejected during the ice formation, these salts can precipitate and accumulate within the ice, influencing the ability of light to pass through the ice. Given that more salts will precipitate with colder temperatures as brine becomes more concentrated, colder temperatures can result in a greater change to the optics of the ice as more salts accumulate. Lower light levels in brine pockets can impact the survivability of photosynthetic organisms such as cyanobacteria and diatoms. These organisms have developed adaptations so that they can survive in this extremely light-limited environment.

== Microbial diversity and abundance ==
=== Bacteria ===
Brine pockets are home to a diverse and dynamic community of marine bacteria which are adapted to survive and thrive in the extreme cold, called psychrophiles. As psychrophiles are adapted to survive and grow at very low temperatures, they are capable of synthesizing enzymes that remain active at low temperatures, allowing them to metabolize in the extremely cold conditions of brine pockets and channels. Bacteria in brine pockets must also be able to tolerate high salt concentrations, so these bacteria are also halophilic. Halophilic psychrophiles are found within Proteobacteria, Actinobacteria and Bacteroidetes.

Two Proteobacteria found to be abundant in brine pockets are gammaproteobacteria and alphaproteobacteria. Many gammaproteobacteria are capable of degrading organic matter, making them important for nutrient cycling and organic matter turnover within the brine pocket. For example, aerobic anoxygenic phototrophic (AAP) bacteria are found in marine environments and play a vital role in supporting the electron transport chain by metabolizing bacteriochlorophyll. Alphaproteobacteria include species that are known to be important for nitrogen cycling and carbon cycling in marine environments. Some Alphaproteobacteria are capable of nitrogen fixation, which can provide an important source of nitrogen for other microorganisms within the pocket.

Actinobacteria are also halophilic psyschrophiles that have been found in brine pockets, known for their ability to produce a wide range of secondary metabolites, including antibiotics and other bioactive compounds. Actinobacteria are often found in association with other microorganisms, where they may play a role in protecting their host from pathogens or other threats.

Lastly, bacteroidetes are found to be abundant in brine pockets, as they can degrade complex organic matter, including carbohydrates and proteins, such as algae-derived ocean polysaccharides. Compared to other bacteria, bacteroidetes species have been shown to contain more genes associated with polysaccharide degradation, allowing them to play a major contributing role in brine pocket carbon- and nutrient-cycling.

=== Viruses ===
Brine pockets can support a wide variety of bacteria, and they are also home to high concentrations of marine viruses. Marine viruses in brine pockets may play a major role in regulating the population dynamics of their hosts and influencing biogeochemical cycles within the pocket. As viruses are highly specific to their hosts, viruses in brine pockets include bacteriophages, which infect bacteria, and archaeal viruses, which infect archaea. Algal viruses and other eukaryotic viruses can also be present in brine pockets, which influences the productivity and diversity of these microorganisms. Marine viruses in brine pockets can also influence biogeochemical processes by releasing nutrients through the lysis of infected cells, and by facilitating horizontal gene transfer between hosts. Infections caused by viruses can also trigger changes in the host metabolism, leading to altered nutrient uptake and production of metabolites, which in turn can influence the surrounding environment.

The few studies on viral abundance and composition in brine pockets focus mainly on the diverse concentrations of viruses, separated by molecular size. Brine pockets in the Antarctic lakes have been found to have three groups of viruses at different abundances. In the Arctic waters, viral concentrations were found to vary from 1.6 to 82 × 10^{6} ml^{−1}, with the highest concentrations found in the coldest brine pockets (–24 to –31 °C).

=== Protists ===
Brine pockets harbor a diverse and abundant array of protists that are able to survive in extreme conditions. The most common protists in sea ice are pennate diatoms, which can accumulate in numbers so high that sea ice is visibly discolored brown. Sea ice pennate diatom populations can become very dense, reaching up to 1000 μg of chlorophyll per liter of seawater, compared to a typical maximum of 5 μg/L in the open ocean. Due to their high abundance in sea ice, pennate diatoms can profoundly impact the microecosystem within a brine pocket, such as DMSP production. Although diatoms themselves are not high producers of DMSP overall, because of their high abundance within sea ice, the amount of DMSP produced within sea ice as a cryoprotectant and osmoregulator can be impactful.

In addition to pennate diatoms, brine pockets and channels house a variety of flagellates, amoebae, and ciliates. Protist abundance and diversity within a brine pocket/channel is primarily limited to brine pocket/channel structure. Specifically, the size of pores and channels within the ice can limit or encourage the distribution of certain protists and metazoans, with some areas with larger pore sizes having greater abundances of large predatory protists such as ciliates, and other areas with reduced populations of predatory protists due to smaller pore sizes. Brine pockets which are accessed by smaller pores can experience a higher abundance of photoautotrophic protists as well as smaller heterotrophic protists due to limited grazing pressure by the reduced abundance of large predators, such as large ciliates and metazoan predators.

=== High population densities ===
Since sea ice pockets are confined and highly-concentrated ecosystems, they are able to house several orders of magnitude greater population densities of bacteria and protists than are found in the open ocean (up to thousands of individuals per liter for protists). This high abundance of organisms can pose challenges, as different bacteria and protists will compete for resources. A high density of microorganisms can result in the accumulation of metabolic byproducts, such as oxygen, dissolved organic matter, ammonia, and dimethylsulfoniopropionate (DMSP). Some organisms can gain a selective advantage within brine pockets as the high population density can result in increased rates of horizontal gene transfer because organisms are in close proximity. Horizontal gene transfer can allow certain organisms to obtain genes from bacteria that may be advantageous in a light-limited, extremely cold environment.

== Microbial adaptations ==
Survival in sea ice brine pockets and channels, which are freezing, hypersaline, and light-limited environments, requires organisms to adapt well to these conditions. Photosynthetic protists and cyanobacteria need to be able to produce energy through alternate metabolic pathways when light is limited within brine pockets. Sea ice brine pockets in Arctic and Antarctic sea ice sheets will experience several weeks of no light at certain locations. In addition to sea ice and snow blocking light from entering brine pockets, seasonal variations of light levels can result in brine pockets being extremely light-limited at times. Sea ice diatoms can alter their metabolic and photosynthetic pathways to survive during periods of little-to-no light. Such adaptations include developing flexible photosystems and altering photosynthetic pigment compositions to allow diatoms to photoacclimate and maintain high photosynthetic efficiency when light levels are low. Sea ice diatoms also have the ability to upregulate and downregulate proteins required for photosynthesis rapidly as light levels change, which helps them survive the environmental stresses of becoming trapped in sea ice and being released back into the ocean as ice melts. Additionally, sea ice microalgae (photosynthetic protists) may be mixotrophic, allowing them to switch to heterotrophy when light is limited. Some research has shown that sea ice diatoms can use an ancient bacterial metabolic pathway known as the Entner−Doudoroff pathway (EDP) to maintain metabolism and energy production during light limitation.

The ability of diatoms to use light for energy also depends on air temperature. As it gets colder, the thylakoid membranes within the microalgae plastids can become dense and compact, which influences how certain photosynthetic proteins (such as the proteins necessary for Photosystems I & II) function and self-assemble. Sea ice diatoms can alter the saturation of the fatty acids that compose the thylakoid membranes as temperatures decrease, which can provide more fluidity to these membranes and result in proper folding of photosynthetic proteins at subzero temperatures.

As temperatures within brine pockets decrease, organisms that survive within brine pockets produce substances that can help prevent freezing. Some sea ice diatoms can produce specialized ice-binding proteins and extracellular polymeric substances, which can help increase the habitat space available within a brine pocket by preventing ice formation and reducing the freezing temperature of the brine. Decreased temperatures can also reduce the efficiency of important physiological processes within many microorganisms. Psychrophilic diatoms and bacteria have the ability to regulate their production of proteins, DNA, and enzymes required for metabolism to help maintain metabolic efficiency in colder temperatures. In the same way that diatoms can regulate the fatty acid composition within their plastid membranes, they can also regulate the plasma membranes surrounding each cell. As temperatures decrease, membranes become less fluid. Both bacteria and sea ice diatoms can alter the fatty acid composition within their membranes to include more unsaturated fatty acids, which allow the plasma membrane to maintain fluidity in extreme cold temperatures.

== Sampling ==
=== Melted sample analysis ===
Methods used to study larger eukaryotes present in sea ice are also used to study other smaller microbes. Regardless of sea ice type, standard practice has been to eventually melt the collected sea ice sample before analysis for convenience. Analytical methods developed to investigate pelagic microbes can readily be applied to these melted sea ice samples. One drawback of this approach is that melting the sea ice exposes microbes accustomed to the hypersaline conditions of brine pockets and channels to significantly fresher water. The melting sea ice contains little-to-no salt, greatly diluting the salt concentration of the liquid phase of the sea ice sample. Osmotic shock and lysis may occur if the salinity decreases too much; additionally, careless warming of the sea ice sample may cause the microbes present to undergo thermal shock. One solution has been to melt the ice into a known volume of seawater kept at subzero temperatures filtered by pelagic microbes. This minimizes the decrease in salinity and drop in temperature and subsequently minimizes the loss of live microbes in the sample. Ice samples colder than –10 °C, however, will still see the loss of over half of the microbial population in the sample when using this approach. Colder ice samples will have brine pools with microbe populations that are adapted to significantly greater salinity and much colder temperatures than underlying seawater, requiring them to be melted into sterile brine solutions that match their further elevated salinity and even lower temperatures prior to analysis.

=== Unmelted sample analysis ===
Methods to analyze the microbe populations of colder, unmelted ice samples (cold enough to prevent brine drainage) under microscopes were developed by designing specialized equipment. Epifluorescence microscopes that can operate at subzero temperatures allowed researchers to observe undisturbed brine pool microbe populations with the addition of DAPI (DNA staining 4', 6-diamidino-2-phenylindole) mixed into an adequately salty and cold brine solution to highlight non-autofluorescing microbes. Alternatively, a microscope with a cold stage, commonly used to study glacial ice, may also be used to study unmelted sea ice with the right modifications.

Other stains such as Alcian Blue (stains extracellular polysaccharide substances) and CTC (stains oxygen-respiring bacteria, 5-cyano-2,3-ditolyl tetrazolium) have also been used. Alcian Blue stains have revealed that extracellular polymeric substances (EPS) are ubiquitous throughout brine pools found in sea ice, even without any microbes visible in the brine pool. Some EPS originates from seawater before freezing but is also produced in copious amounts within algal bands and by bacteria to a lesser extent but throughout the entirety of the sea ice. CTC stains have indicated greater percentages of microbial activity within the sea ice when compared to the seawater below it, especially bacteria associated with particulate matter.

CTC has also been applied to the staining of unmelted sections of sea ice sampled during spring and summer, which were subsequently returned to the ice core holes they were collected from for in situ incubation. After recollection, metabolic activity was halted by adding a fixative into the melting sea ice. DAPI and Alcian Blue were then used to stain subsamples of the resulting melted sea ice sample, bypassing the restrictive temperature requirement. It was found that gel-like particles of EPS associated with bacteria were in situ bacterial activity hotspots.

Extracellular enzyme activity has been detected down to as low as –18 °C in unmelted sea ice using a fluorescently-labeled protein substrate analogue. Relying on melted sea ice samples runs the risk of underestimating in situ activity due to the dilution of microbial populations.

=== Direct collection ===
A thick portion of sea ice is partially drilled into to create a hole that is covered and left to accumulate draining brine at the bottom before being collected later. This brine drainage occurs much more slowly as temperatures decrease, especially below –5 °C, which is the limit for bulk ice permeability. One limitation to this method is that the origins of the drained brine, as well as what proportion of microbes were left behind in the brine pool, cannot be known with certainty. Studies on these "sackhole" brines have illustrated that substantial bacteria and viruses can be found within brine pools.
