= Total inorganic carbon =

Sum of the inorganic carbon species

Total inorganic carbon (C_{T} or TIC) is the sum of the inorganic carbon species.

Carbon compounds can be distinguished as either organic or inorganic, and dissolved or particulate, depending on their composition. Organic carbon forms the backbone of key components of organic compounds such as proteins, lipids, carbohydrates, and nucleic acids. Inorganic carbon is found primarily in simple compounds such as carbon dioxide (CO_{2}), carbonic acid (H_{2}CO_{3}), bicarbonate (HCO^{−}_{3}), and carbonate (CO^{2−}_{3}).

== Overview ==
The aquatic inorganic carbon system is composed of the various ionic, dissolved, solid, and/or gaseous forms of carbon dioxide in water. These species include dissolved carbon dioxide, carbonic acid, bicarbonate anion, carbonate anion, calcium carbonate, magnesium carbonate, and others. The relative amounts of each species in a body of water depends on physical variables including temperature and salinity, as well as chemical variables like pH and gas partial pressure. Variables like alkalinity and dissolved (or total) inorganic carbon further define a mass and charge balance that constrains the total state of the system.

Given any two of the four central inorganic carbon system parameters (pH, alkalinity, dissolved inorganic carbon, partial pressure of carbon dioxide) the remainder may be derived by solving a system of equations that adhere to the principles of chemical thermodynamics.

For most of the 20th century, chemical equilibria in marine and freshwater systems were calculated according to various conventions, which led to discrepancies among laboratories' calculations and limited scientific reproducibility. Since 1998, a family of software programs called CO2SYS has been widely used. This software calculate chemical equilibria for aquatic inorganic carbon species and parameters. Their core function is to use any two of the four central inorganic carbon system parameters (pH, alkalinity, dissolved inorganic carbon, and partial pressure of carbon dioxide) to calculate various chemical properties of the system. The programs are widely used by oceanographers and limnologists to understand and predict chemical equilibria in natural waters.

== Inorganic carbon species ==
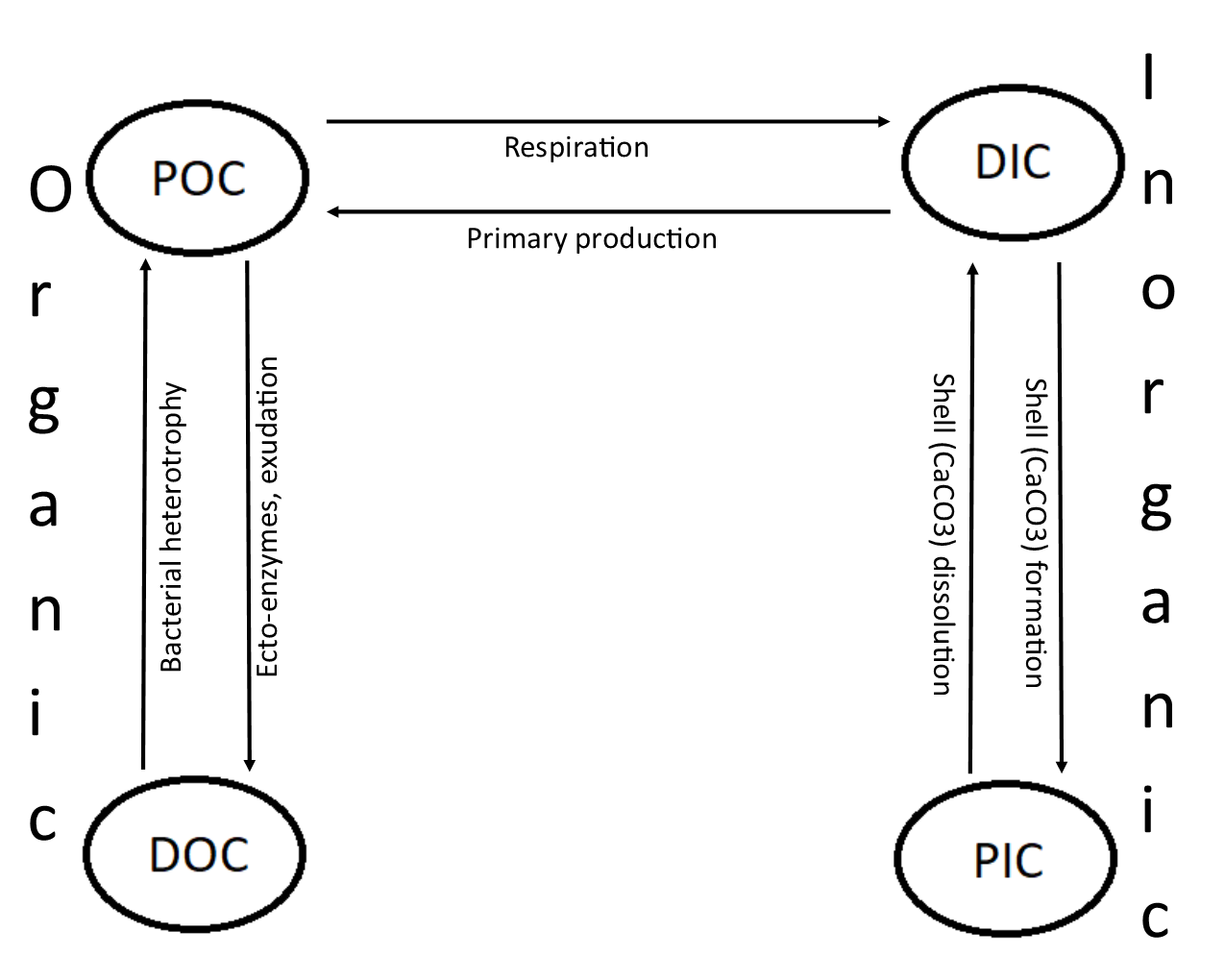
Carbon is separated into four distinct pools based on whether it is organic or inorganic, and whether it is dissolved or particulate. The processes associated with each arrow describe the transformation associated with the transfer of carbon from one reservoir to another.

The inorganic carbon species include carbon dioxide, carbonic acid, bicarbonate anion, and carbonate. It is customary to express carbon dioxide and carbonic acid simultaneously as CO_{2}*. C_{T} is a key parameter when making measurements related to the pH of natural aqueous systems, and carbon dioxide flux estimates.

$$C_T = \ce{[CO2^\star]{} + [HCO3^-]{} + [CO3^{2-}]}$$

where,

- C_{T} is the total inorganic carbon
- [CO_{2}*] is the sum of carbon dioxide and carbonic acid concentrations ([CO_{2}*] = [CO_{2}] + [H_{2}CO_{3}])
- [HCO^{−}_{3}] is the bicarbonate concentration
- [CO^{2−}_{3}] is the carbonate concentration

Each of these species are related by the following pH-driven chemical equilibria:

$$\ce{CO2 + H2O <=> H2CO3 <=> H+ + HCO3- <=> 2 H+ + CO3^2-}$$

The concentrations of the different species of DIC (and which species is dominant) depends on the pH of the solution, as shown by a Bjerrum plot.

Total inorganic carbon is typically measured by the acidification of the sample which drives the equilibria to CO_{2}. This gas is then sparged from solution and trapped, and the quantity trapped is then measured, usually by infrared spectroscopy.

== Marine carbon ==
Relationship between carbon types

Marine carbon is further separated into particulate and dissolved phases. These pools are operationally defined by physical separation – dissolved carbon passes through a 0.2 μm filter, and particulate carbon does not.

There are two main types of inorganic carbon that are found in the oceans:

- Dissolved inorganic carbon (DIC) is made up of bicarbonate (HCO^{−}_{3}), carbonate (CO^{2−}_{3}) and carbon dioxide (including both dissolved CO_{2} and carbonic acid H_{2}CO_{3}). DIC can be converted to particulate inorganic carbon (PIC) through precipitation of CaCO_{3} (biologically or abiotically). DIC can also be converted to particulate organic carbon (POC) through photosynthesis and chemoautotrophy (primary production). DIC increases with depth as organic carbon particles sink and are respired. Free oxygen decreases as DIC increases because oxygen is consumed during aerobic respiration.
- Particulate inorganic carbon (PIC) is the other form of inorganic carbon found in the ocean. Most PIC is the CaCO_{3} that makes up shells of various marine organisms, but can also form in whiting events. Marine fish also excrete calcium carbonate during osmoregulation.

Some of the inorganic carbon species in the ocean, such as bicarbonate and carbonate, are major contributors to alkalinity, a natural ocean buffer that prevents drastic changes in acidity (or pH). The marine carbon cycle also affects the reaction and dissolution rates of some chemical compounds, regulates the amount of carbon dioxide in the atmosphere and Earth's temperature.
