= Ocean acidification in the Great Barrier Reef =

Threat to the reef which harms corals

Ocean acidification threatens the Great Barrier Reef by reducing the viability and strength of coral reefs. The Great Barrier Reef, considered one of the seven natural wonders of the world and a biodiversity hotspot, is located in Australia. Similar to other coral reefs, it is experiencing degradation due to ocean acidification. Ocean acidification results from a rise in atmospheric carbon dioxide, which is taken up by the ocean. This process can increase sea surface temperature, decrease aragonite, and lower the pH of the ocean. The more humanity consumes fossil fuels, the more the ocean absorbs released CO_{2}, furthering ocean acidification.

This decreased health of coral reefs, particularly the Great Barrier Reef, can result in reduced biodiversity. Organisms can become stressed due to ocean acidification and the disappearance of healthy coral reefs, such as the Great Barrier Reef, is a loss of habitat for several taxa. Ocean acidification makes it harder for organisms to reproduce affecting the ecosystem in the Great Barrier Reef.

Species of fish can be affected immensely from ocean acidification which disrupts the overall ecosystem. There is a possible solution that can reverse the effects of ocean acidification called alkalization injection. Alkalization injection injects a solution into the ocean and increases the pH of the water. Coral reefs are very important to society and the economy.

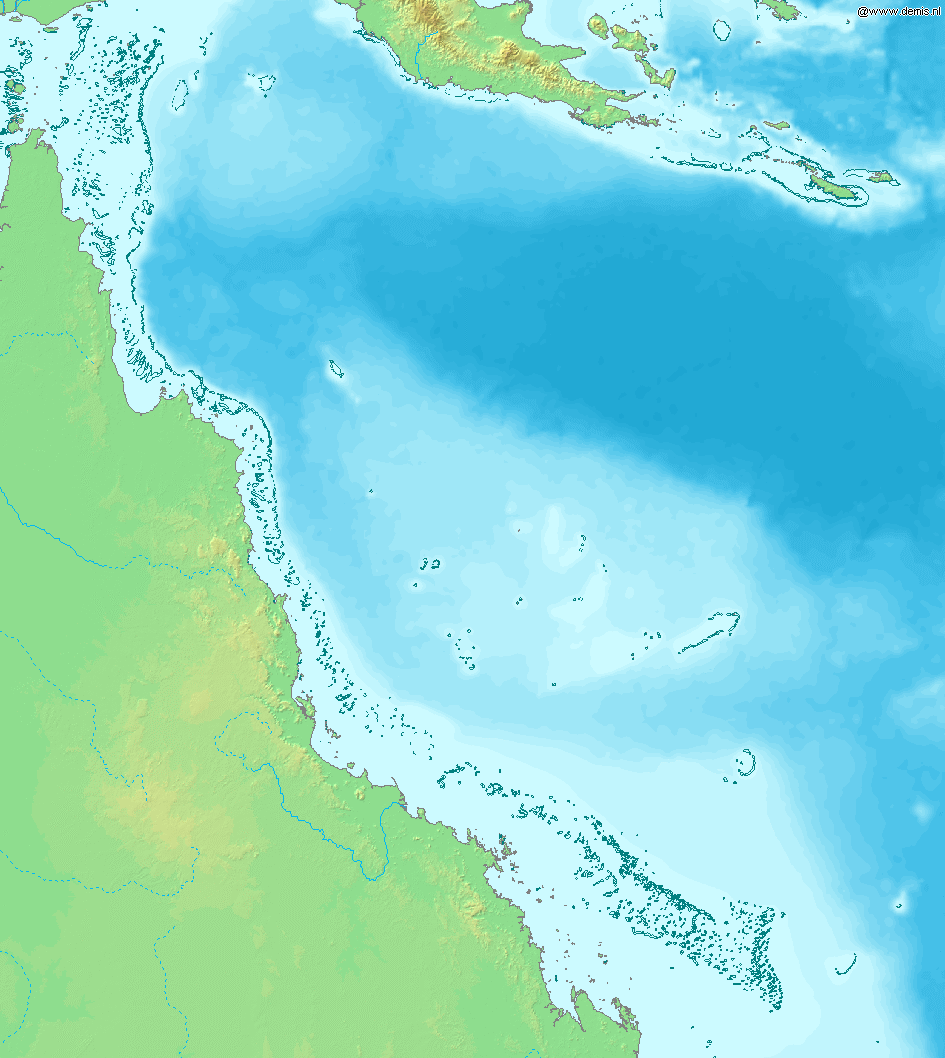
Map of the Great Barrier Reef

== Background ==
Atmospheric carbon dioxide has risen from 280 to 409 ppm since the industrial revolution. Around 30% of carbon dioxide released from humans have been absorbed into the ocean during that era. This increase in carbon dioxide has led to a 0.1 decrease in pH, and it could decrease by 0.5 by 2100. When carbon dioxide meets seawater, it forms carbonic acid; the molecules dissociate into hydrogen, bicarbonate, and carbonate, and they lower the pH of the ocean. Sea surface temperature, ocean acidity, and dissolved inorganic carbon are also positively correlated with atmospheric carbon dioxide. Ocean acidification can cause hypercapnia and increase stress in marine organisms, thereby leading to decreased biodiversity. Coral reefs themselves can also be negatively affected by ocean acidification, as calcification rates decrease and acidity increases.

Aragonite is impacted by the process of ocean acidification because it is a form of calcium carbonate. It is essential in coral viability and health because it is found in coral skeletons and is more readily soluble than calcite. Increasing carbon dioxide levels can reduce coral growth rates from 9 to 56% due to the lack of available carbonate ions needed for the calcification process. Other calcifying organisms, such as bivalves and gastropods, experience negative effects due to ocean acidification as well. The excess hydrogen ions in the acidic water dissolve their shells, limiting their shelter and reproduction rates.

As a biodiversity hotspot, the many taxa of the Great Barrier Reef are threatened by ocean acidification. Rare and endemic species are in greater danger due to ocean acidification, because they rely upon the Great Barrier Reef more extensively. Additionally, the risk of coral reefs collapsing due to acidification poses a threat to biodiversity. The stress of ocean acidification could also negatively affect other biological processes, such as reducing photosynthesis or reproduction and allowing organisms to become vulnerable to disease.

The Great Barrier Reef is susceptible to poor water quality and the impacts of ocean acidification. There are thirty five major rivers that discharge nutrient and sediment loads, there is about five to eight times the amount of discharge then prior to European settlement. These discharges lead to elevated seawater nutrients and turbidity which further promotes the impacts Ocean acidification.

== Coral health ==
=== Calcification and aragonite ===
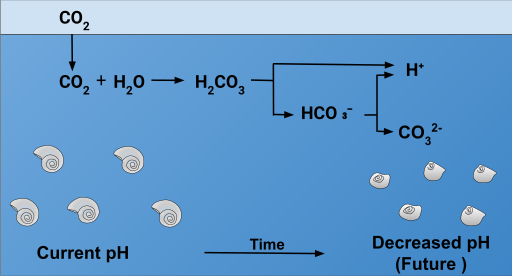
Carbon dioxide (CO_{2}) reacts with water to form carbonic acid (H_{2}CO_{3}), which dissociates into bicarbonate (HCO_{3}^{-}) and hydrogen ions (H^{+}), leading to a reduction in carbonate ions (CO_{3}^{2-}) and shell dissolution over time.

Coral is a calcifying organism, putting it at high risk for decay and slow growth rates as ocean acidification increases. Aragonite assists the coral as they build their skeletons because it is another form of calcium carbonate (CaCO_{3}) that is more soluble. When the pH of the water decreases, aragonite decreases as well, leading to the loss of calcium carbonate uptake in corals. Levels of aragonite have decreased by 16% since industrialization and could be lower in some portions of the Great Barrier Reef due to the current, which allows northern corals to take up more aragonite than southern corals. Aragonite is predicted to reduce by 0.1 by 2100 which could greatly hinder coral growth. Since 1990, calcification rates of Porites, a common large reef-building coral in the Great Barrier Reef, have decreased by 14.2% annually. Aragonite levels across the Great Barrier Reef itself are not equal; due to currents and circulation, some portions of the Great Barrier Reef can have half as much aragonite as others. Levels of aragonite are also affected by calcification and production, which can vary from reef to reef. If atmospheric carbon dioxide reaches 560 ppm, most ocean surface waters will be adversely undersaturated with respect to aragonite, and the pH will have reduced by about 0.24 units, from almost 8.2 today to just over 7.9. At this point (sometime in the third quarter of this century, at current rates of carbon dioxide increase), only a few parts of the Pacific will have levels of aragonite saturation adequate for coral growth. Additionally, if atmospheric carbon dioxide reaches 800 ppm, the ocean surface water pH decrease will be 0.4 units, and the total dissolved carbonate ion concentration will have decreased by at least 60%. Recent estimates state that with business-as-usual emission levels, the atmospheric carbon dioxide could reach 800 ppm by the year 2100. At this point, it is almost certain that all the reefs in the world will be in erosional states. Increasing the pH and replicating pre-industrialization ocean chemistry conditions in the Great Barrier Reef, however, led to an increase in coral growth rates of 7%.

=== Temperature ===
Ocean acidification can also lead to increased sea surface temperature. An increase of about 1 or 2 °C can cause the collapse of the relationship between coral and zooxanthellae, possibly leading to bleaching. The average sea surface temperature in the Great Barrier Reef is predicted to increase between 1 and 3 °C by 2100. Bleaching occurs when the zooxanthellae and coralline algae leave the coral skeleton behind due to stresses in the water. This causes the coral to lose its colour because the previous organisms sustained on the coral skeleton vacate, leaving a white skeleton. The bleached coral can no longer complete photosynthesis, and so it slowly dies. The acidity of the water will slowly dissolve the leftover coral skeletons, essentially damaging the structural integrity of the coral reef. There are many organisms that also rely on the algae and zooxanthellae for their main source of food. Therefore, organisms in the bleached coral reef are forced to leave in search of new food sources. Since zooxanthellae and algae grow very slowly, restoring the coral reef to its original form will take a very long time. This breakdown of the relationship between the coral and the zooxanthellae occurs when Photosystem II is damaged, either due to a reaction with the D1 protein or a lack of carbon dioxide fixation; these result in a lack of photosynthesis and can lead to bleaching.

=== Reproduction ===
Ocean acidification threatens coral reproduction throughout almost all aspects of the process. Gametogenesis may be indirectly affected by coral bleaching. Additionally, the stress that acidification puts on coral can potentially harm the viability of the sperm released. Larvae can also be affected by this process; metabolism and settlement cues could be altered, changing the size of the population or viability of reproduction. Other species of calcifying larvae have shown reduced growth rates under ocean acidification scenarios. Biofilm, a bioindicator for oceanic conditions, underwent a reduced growth rate and altered composition in acidification, possibly affecting larval settlement on the biofilm itself.

=== Health Reports of The Great Barrier Reef ===
Throughout the years there have been a few mass bleaching events that have affected the Great Barrier Reef. In particular, the years of 2016 and 2017, saw the reef sustain two years of back to back bleaching periods. This long period accounted for an estimated loss of half of the coral life in the Great Barrier Reef. The parts of the reef that did survive were damaged, leading to an overall period of low coral reproduction. This was later followed by another bleaching event in 2020, making it the third bleaching event in five years. Studies found however that the results of the 2020 bleaching were not too severe, as it only affected a minimal amount of reefs, with most being in the lower to moderate levels of bleaching.

In early 2022 a study showed, 91% of coral in the Great Barrier Reef, have experienced some degree of coral bleaching. The reefs that had higher levels of bleaching, often were accompanied by higher overall air temperature. These temperature levels lasted all through the summer season in Australia, attributing to prolonged coral bleaching periods. Prolonged periods raise concern, as corals would not be able to reproduce and die out, leading to more loss of the reefs. However, recent reports from June 2022, have stated that the Great Barrier Reef, is currently recovering. Reefs affected by bleaching have lowered to 16% along different areas of the Australian Coast. As ocean temperatures continue to drop, we can expect bleaching levels to go down, and coral levels to increase. Though coral bleaching has gone down, predators of the coral reef, Crown-of-thorns starfish, are still impacting coral growth and development.

== Biodiversity ==
Biodiversity refers to the variety of life forms, including species diversity, genetic diversity, and ecosystem diversity. The Great Barrier Reef is a biodiversity hotspot, ranging over 9000 known species. However, since the 1950's half of the living corals on the Great Barrier Reef have died, and coral reef-associated biodiversity has declined by sixty three percent. Only an estimated twenty five percent of these species have been formally discovered, leaving a substantial proportion yet to be scientifically classified. We are no doubt losing species we have yet to identify in the wake of a shifting climate.

Reduced levels of aragonite, as a result of ocean acidification, continues to be one of the Great Barrier Reef's biggest threats. Healthy reefs support thousands of different corals, fish and marine mammals, but bleached reefs lose their ability to support and sustain life. Coral structural formations create complex habitats critical for providing shelter, breeding grounds, and food sources for numerous marine organisms, including fish, invertebrates, and microorganisms. In turn, corals depend on reef fish and other organisms to clean and regulate algae levels, provide nutrients for coral growth, and keep pests in check. Coral reefs and the species they host have dynamic symbiotic relationships.

Ocean acidification can also indirectly affect any organism, having reduced growth rates, decreased reproductive capacity, increased susceptibility to disease, and elevated mortality rates. Bleaching events trigger homogenization of coral composition and losses of structural complexity which can be detrimental to reef fish and other organisms that depend on branching coral for breeding and shelter. This decrease in ecosystem diversity has direct effects on species diversity.

=== Vulnerable Species ===
As coral reefs decay, their residents will have to adapt or find new habitats on which to rely. Ocean acidification threatens the fundamental chemical balance of our oceans, creating conditions that eat away at essential minerals like calcium carbonate. A lack of aragonite and decreasing pH levels in ocean water makes it harder for calcifying organisms such as oysters, clams, lobsters, shrimp and coral reefs to build their shells and exoskeletons. Organisms have been found to be more sensitive to the effects of ocean acidification in early, larval or planktonic stages. Larval health and settlement of both calcifying and non-calcifying organisms can be harmed by ocean acidification.

A study published in the journal Global Change Biology developed a model for predicting the vulnerability of sharks and sting rays to climate change in the Great Barrier Reef. It was found that 30 of the 133 species were identified as moderately or highly vulnerable to climate change with the most vulnerable species being the freshwater whipray, porcupine ray, speartooth shark, and sawfish. Increasing temperature is also affecting the behavior and fitness of may reef species such as the common coral trout, a very important fish in sustaining the health of coral reefs. Not only can ocean acidification affect habitat and development, but it can also affect how organisms view predators and conspecifics. Studies on the effects of ocean acidification have not been performed on long enough time scales to see if organisms can adapt to these conditions. However, ocean acidification is predicted to occur at a rate that evolution cannot match.

Some fish can compensate for disturbances under high CO_{2} conditions but they show unexpected sensitivity to current and future growing CO_{2} levels. The sensitivity affects many physiological and behavioral processes, including the growth to otoliths which are calcium carbonate structures in fish ears that aid in balance. Also, it affects functions in the brains, the amount of energy the fish uses, and the amount of nutrients a fish can absorb. The consequences of disrupted neurotransmitters like GABA are still being studied, but it can affect fish in the near future. Sensitivity of fish from ocean acidification varies between species with sensory perception being affected the most between all species.

=== Crown of Thorns Sea Star ===
A naturally occurring predator to coral reefs in the Great Barrier Reef is the Crown of Thorns sea star (Acanthaster planci). Population outbreaks of the Crown of Thorns sea star are one of the major causes of coral decline across the Great Barrier Reef, as an adult crown-of-thorns starfish is capable of consuming up to 10 m2 of reef building coral a year. However, each species of coral is not equally impacted, as the sea star has been observed to favor branching species of coral, Acropora, followed by a sub branching species. This results in a sequential and ordered eradication of coral reef species.

Crown of Thorns Sea Star outbreaks on the Great Barrier Reef have become more frequent in recent years, which scientists predict could be linked to human activities. Any increase in nutrients, possibly from river run-off, can positively affect starfish populations, leading to detrimental outbreaks. As pressures from climate change increase, the time between reef disturbances is becoming shorter, leaving less time for reef recovery.

== Possible Solution ==
A simulation from 2015 has shown a potential solution that involves artificial ocean alkalization. This method contains a solution that increases the alkalinity of water by about 4 moles. Ships will inject artificial ocean alkalization throughout the coast of the ocean and it would increase the pH of the ocean, causing ocean acidification to go away temporarily. Through the simulation, the results stated a significant increase in aragonite saturation state across the Great Barrier Reef. The use of alkalization would offset around 4 years of ocean acidification. Also, the results showed that there was an increase in aragonite saturation state in about 25% of the reefs which means that alkalization is helpful in reducing OA.

== Importance of Coral Reefs ==
Being a major hotspots of biodiversity, coral reefs are very important to the ecosystem and livelihood of marine and human life. Countries around the world depend on reefs as a source of food and income, especially for civilizations that inhabit small islands. With over a 60% decrease in available fishing around coral reefs, many countries, will be forced to adapt. Coral Reefs are also important for a countries economy, as reefs provide various forms of tourist activities, that can generate a lot of revenue for the economy. These can also contribute to individual levels of wellness, as the owners of these business, profit off of increased visitation and usage. Coral Reefs also provide, a form of coastal infrastructure, that acts as a barrier protecting coastal communities from major ocean catastrophes, such as tsunamis and coastal storms.

== See also ==
- Ocean acidification in the Arctic Ocean
