= Ocean acidification =

Decrease of pH levels in the ocean

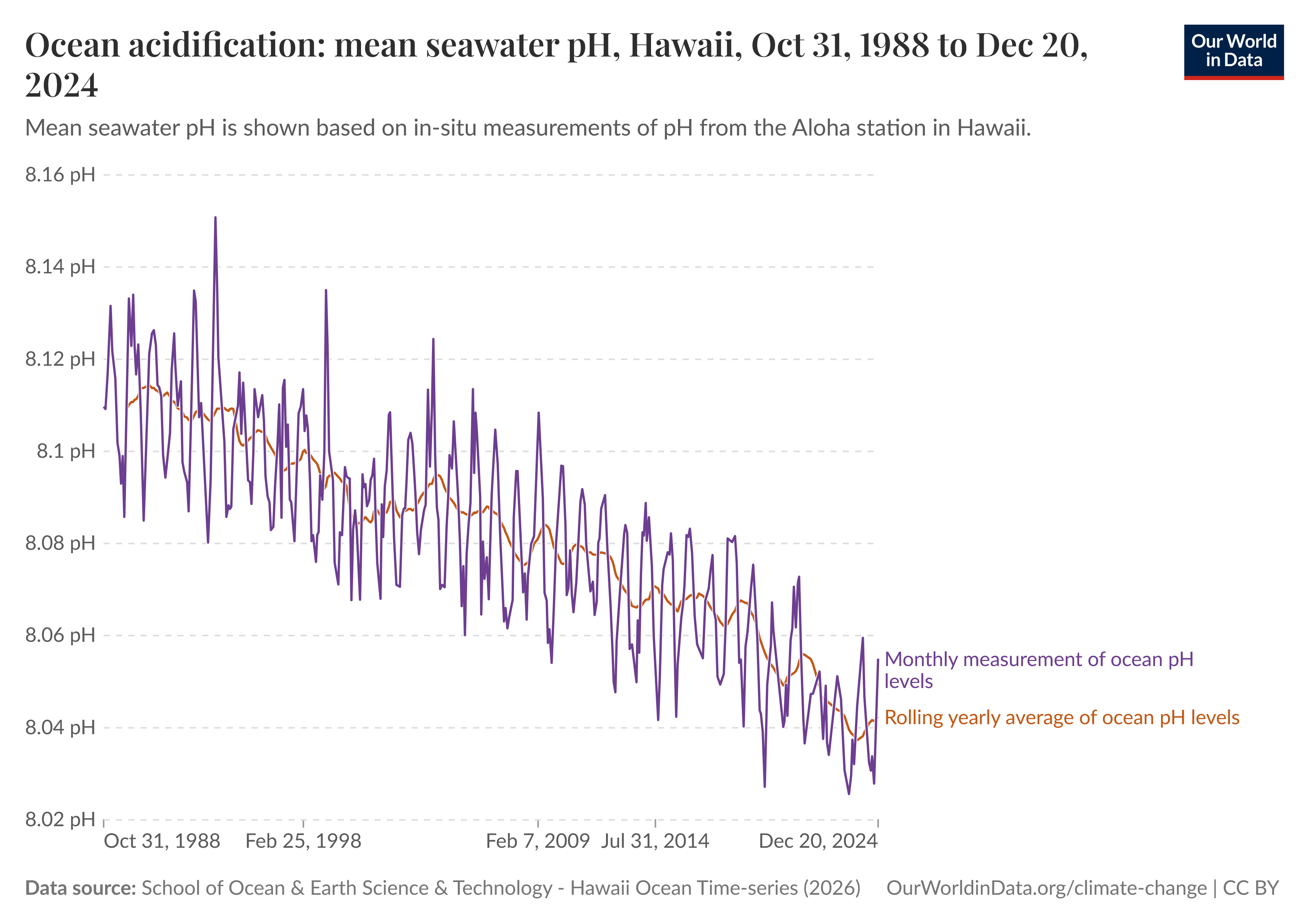
Ocean acidification means that the average seawater pH value is dropping over time.

Ocean acidification is the ongoing decrease in the pH of the Earth's ocean. Between 1950 and 2026, the average pH of the ocean surface fell from approximately 8.15 to 8.05. Carbon dioxide emissions from human activities are the primary cause of ocean acidification, with atmospheric carbon dioxide (CO_{2}) levels exceeding 422 ppm (as of 2024). CO_{2} from the atmosphere is absorbed by the oceans. This chemical reaction produces carbonic acid (H_{2}CO_{3}) which dissociates into a bicarbonate ion (HCO^{−}_{3}) and a hydrogen ion (H^{+}). The presence of free hydrogen ions (H^{+}) lowers the pH of the ocean, increasing acidity (this does not mean that seawater is acidic yet; It is still alkaline, with a pH higher than 8). Marine calcifying organisms, such as mollusks and corals, are especially vulnerable because they rely on calcium carbonate to build shells and skeletons.

A change in pH by 0.1 represents a 26% increase in hydrogen ion concentration in the world's oceans (the pH scale is logarithmic, so a change of one in pH units is equivalent to a tenfold change in hydrogen ion concentration). Sea-surface pH and carbonate saturation states vary depending on ocean depth and location. Colder and higher latitude waters are capable of absorbing more CO_{2}. This can cause acidity to rise, lowering the pH and carbonate saturation levels in these areas. Several other factors influence the atmosphere-ocean CO_{2} exchange, and thus local ocean acidification. These include ocean currents and upwelling zones, proximity to large continental rivers, sea ice coverage, and atmospheric exchange with nitrogen and sulfur from fossil fuel burning and agriculture.

A lower ocean pH has a range of potentially harmful effects for marine organisms. Scientists have observed for example reduced calcification, lowered immune responses, and reduced energy for basic functions such as reproduction. Ocean acidification can impact marine ecosystems that provide food and livelihoods for many people. About one billion people are wholly or partially dependent on the fishing, tourism, and coastal management services provided by coral reefs. Ongoing acidification of the oceans may therefore threaten food chains linked with the oceans.

One of the only solutions that would address the root cause of ocean acidification is reducing carbon dioxide emissions. This is one of the main objectives of climate change mitigation measures. The removal of carbon dioxide from the atmosphere would also help to reverse ocean acidification. In addition, there are some specific ocean-based mitigation methods, for example ocean alkalinity enhancement and enhanced weathering. These strategies are under investigation, but generally have a low technology readiness level and many risks.

Ocean acidification has happened before in Earth's geologic history. The resulting ecological collapse in the oceans had long-lasting effects on the global carbon cycle and climate.

== Cause ==
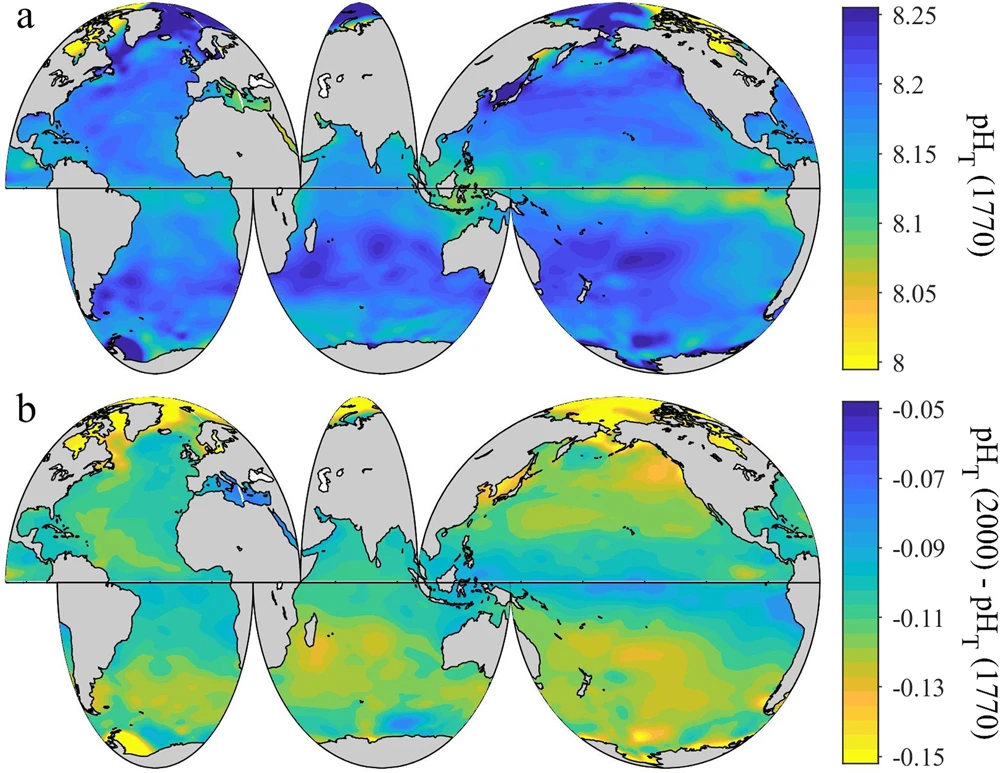
Spatial distribution of global surface ocean pH (Panel a: the annually-averaged surface ocean pH to be approximate for the year 1770; Panel b: the difference between pH in 2000 and 1770 in the global surface ocean).

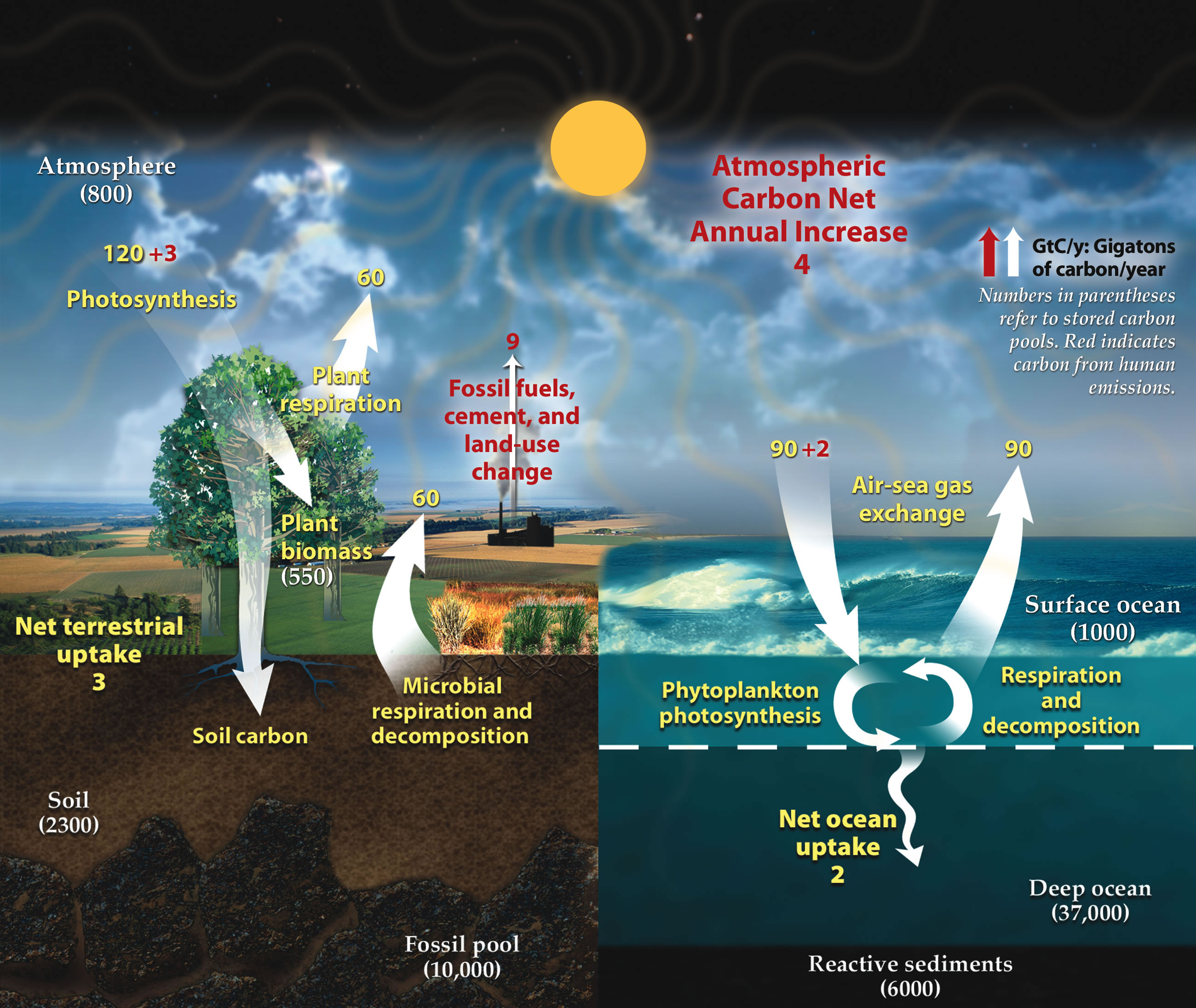
This diagram of the fast carbon cycle shows the movement of carbon between land, atmosphere, and oceans. Yellow numbers are natural fluxes, and red are human contributions in gigatons of carbon per year. White numbers indicate stored carbon.

Video summarizing the impacts of ocean acidification. Source: NOAA Environmental Visualization Laboratory.

In 2021, atmospheric carbon dioxide (CO_{2}) levels of around 415 ppm were around 50% higher than preindustrial concentrations. According to the National Oceanic and Atmospheric Administration in 2023, atmospheric CO_{2} levels have risen from approximately 280 parts per million (ppm) in the pre-industrial era to over 410 ppm today, primarily due to human activities such as fossil fuel combustion and deforestation. The current elevated levels and rapid growth rates are unprecedented in the past 55 million years of the geological record. The sources of this excess CO_{2} are clearly established as human driven: they include anthropogenic fossil fuel, industrial, and land-use/land-change emissions. One source of this is fossil fuels, which are burned for energy. When burned, CO_{2} is released into the atmosphere as a byproduct of combustion, which is a significant contributor to the increasing levels of CO_{2} in the Earth's atmosphere. The ocean acts as a carbon sink for anthropogenic CO_{2} and takes up roughly a quarter of total anthropogenic CO_{2} emissions. However, the additional CO_{2} in the ocean results in a wholesale shift in seawater acid-base chemistry toward more acidic, lower pH conditions and lower saturation states for carbonate minerals used in many marine organism shells and skeletons.

Accumulated since 1850, the ocean sink holds up to 175±35 gigatons of carbon, with more than two-thirds of this amount (120 Gt C) being taken up by the global ocean since 1960. Over the historical period, the ocean sink increased in pace with the exponential anthropogenic emissions increase. From 1850 until 2022, the ocean has absorbed 26% of total anthropogenic emissions. Emissions during the period 1850–2021 amounted to 670±65 gigatons of carbon and were partitioned among the atmosphere (41%), ocean (26%), and land (31%).

The carbon cycle describes the fluxes of carbon dioxide (CO_{2}) between the oceans, terrestrial biosphere, lithosphere, and atmosphere. The carbon cycle involves both organic compounds such as cellulose and inorganic carbon compounds such as carbon dioxide, carbonate ion, and bicarbonate ion, together referenced as dissolved inorganic carbon (DIC). These inorganic compounds are particularly significant in ocean acidification, as they include many forms of dissolved CO_{2} present in the Earth's oceans.

When CO_{2} dissolves, it reacts with water to form a balance of ionic and non-ionic chemical species: dissolved free carbon dioxide (CO_{2}(aq)), carbonic acid (H_{2}CO_{3}), bicarbonate (HCO^{−}_{3}) and carbonate (CO^{2−}_{3}). The ratio of these species depends on factors such as seawater temperature, pressure, and salinity (as shown in a Bjerrum plot). These different forms of dissolved inorganic carbon are transferred from the ocean's surface to its interior by the ocean's solubility pump. The resistance of an area of ocean to absorbing atmospheric CO_{2} is known as the Revelle factor.

== Main effects ==
The ocean's chemistry is changing due to the uptake of anthropogenic carbon dioxide (CO_{2}). Ocean pH, carbonate ion concentrations ([CO^{2−}_{3}]), and calcium carbonate mineral saturation states (Ω) have been declining as a result of the uptake of approximately 30% of the anthropogenic carbon dioxide emissions over the past 270 years (since around 1750). This process, commonly referred to as "ocean acidification", is making it harder for marine calcifiers to build a shell or skeletal structure, endangering coral reefs and the broader marine ecosystems.

Ocean acidification has been called the "evil twin of global warming" and "the other CO_{2} problem". Increased ocean temperatures and oxygen loss act concurrently with ocean acidification and constitute the "deadly trio" of climate change pressures on the marine environment. The impacts of this will be most severe for coral reefs and other shelled marine organisms, as well as those populations that depend on the ecosystem services they provide.

=== Reduction in pH value ===
Dissolving CO_{2} in seawater increases the hydrogen ion (H^{+}) concentration in the ocean, and thus decreases ocean pH, as follows:

CO_{2} _{(aq)} + H_{2}O ⇌ H_{2}CO_{3} ⇌ HCO^{−}_{3} + H^{+} ⇌ CO^{2−}_{3} + 2 H^{+}_{.}

In shallow coastal and shelf regions, a number of factors interplay to affect air-ocean CO_{2} exchange and resulting pH change. These include biological processes, such as photosynthesis and respiration, as well as water upwelling. Also, ecosystem metabolism in freshwater sources reaching coastal waters can lead to large, but local, pH changes.

Freshwater bodies also appear to be acidifying, although this is a more complex and less obvious phenomenon.

The absorption of CO_{2} from the atmosphere does not affect the ocean's alkalinity. This is important to know in this context as alkalinity is the capacity of water to resist acidification. Ocean alkalinity enhancement has been proposed as one option to add alkalinity to the ocean and therefore buffer against pH changes.

=== Decreased calcification in marine organisms ===
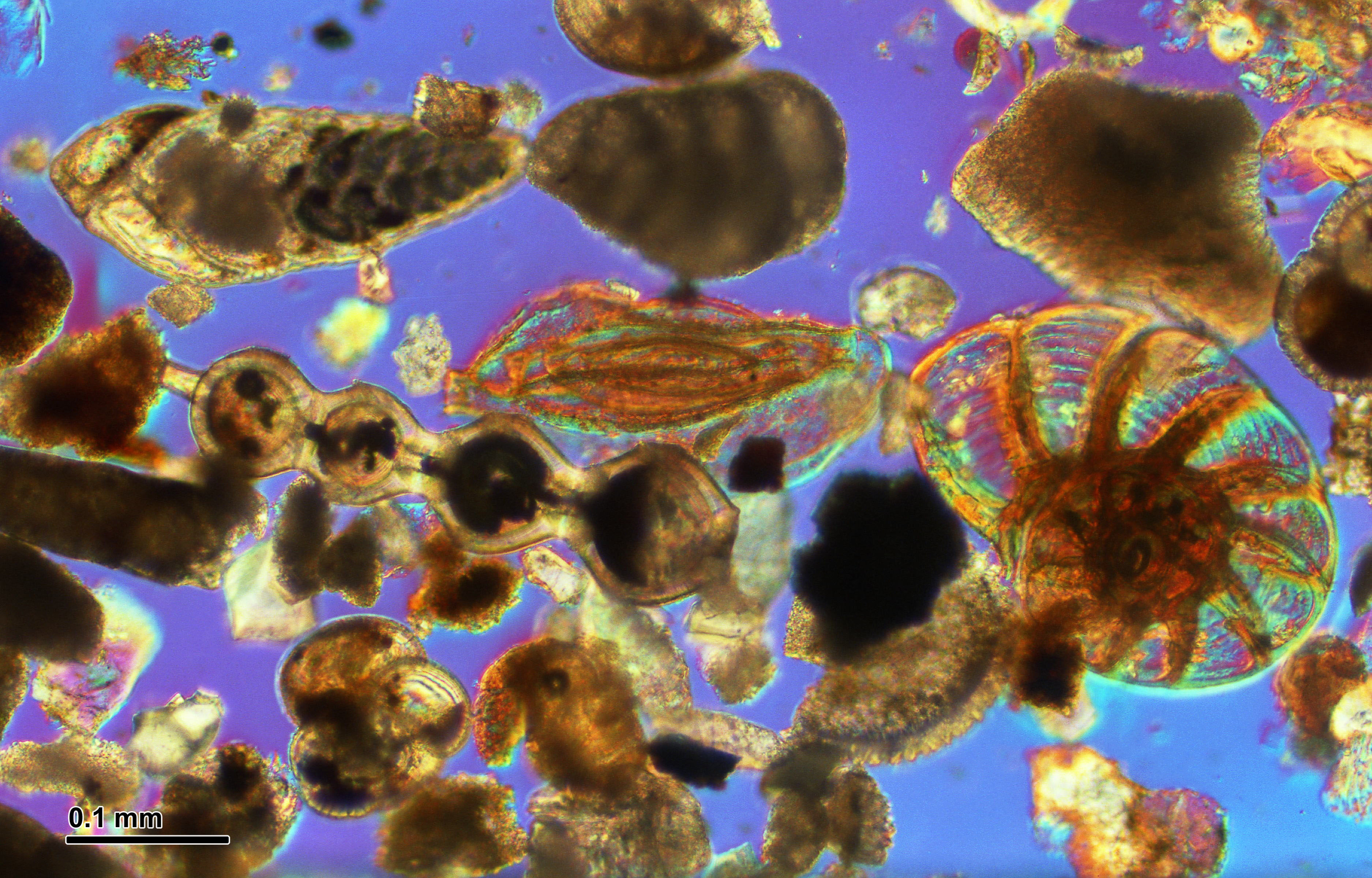
Various types of foraminifera observed through a microscope using differential interference contrast

Bjerrum plot: Change in carbonate system of seawater from ocean acidification

Changes in ocean chemistry can have extensive direct and indirect effects on organisms and their habitats. One of the most important repercussions of increasing ocean acidity relates to the production of shells out of calcium carbonate (CaCO_{3}). This process is called calcification and is important to the biology and survival of a wide range of marine organisms. Calcification involves the precipitation of dissolved ions into solid CaCO_{3} structures, structures for many marine organisms, such as coccolithophores, foraminifera, crustaceans, mollusks, etc. After they are formed, these CaCO_{3} structures are vulnerable to dissolution unless the surrounding seawater contains saturating concentrations of carbonate ions (CO^{2−}_{3}).

Very little of the extra carbon dioxide that is added into the ocean remains as dissolved carbon dioxide. The majority dissociates into additional bicarbonate and free hydrogen ions. The increase in hydrogen is larger than the increase in bicarbonate, creating an imbalance in the reaction:

HCO^{−}_{3} ⇌ CO^{2−}_{3} + H^{+}

To maintain chemical equilibrium, some of the carbonate ions already in the ocean combine with some of the hydrogen ions to make further bicarbonate. Thus the ocean's concentration of carbonate ions is reduced, removing an essential building block for marine organisms to build shells, or calcify:

Ca^{2+} + CO^{2−}_{3} ⇌ CaCO_{3}

The increase in concentrations of dissolved carbon dioxide and bicarbonate, and reduction in carbonate, are shown in the Bjerrum plot.

Disruption of the food chain is also a possible effect as many marine organisms rely on calcium carbonate-based organisms at the base of the food chain for food and habitat. This can potentially have detrimental effects throughout the food web and potentially lead to a decline in availability of fish stocks which would have an impact on human livelihoods.

=== Decrease in saturation state ===
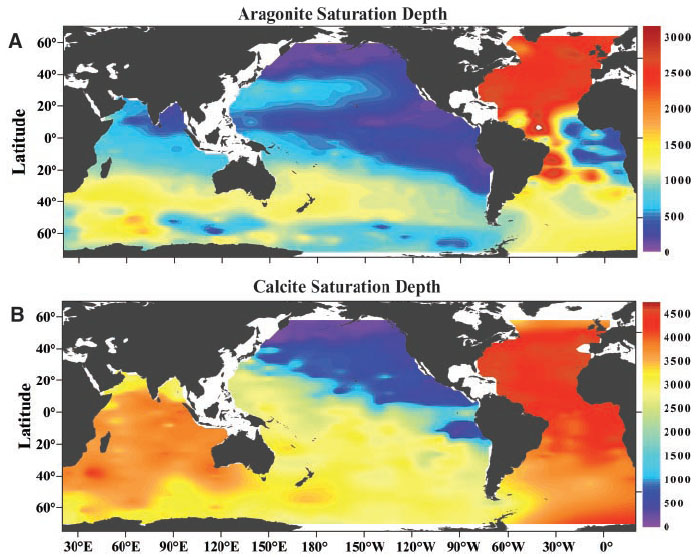
Distribution of (A) aragonite and (B) calcite saturation depth in the global oceans

The saturation state (known as Ω) of seawater for a mineral is a measure of the thermodynamic potential for the mineral to form or to dissolve, and for calcium carbonate is described by the following equation:

$${\Omega} = \frac{\left[\ce{Ca^2+}\right] \left[\ce{CO3^2-}\right]}{K_{sp}}$$

Here Ω is the product of the concentrations (or activities) of the reacting ions that form the mineral (Ca^{+}_{2} and CO^{2−}_{3}), divided by the apparent solubility product at equilibrium (K_{sp}), that is, when the rates of precipitation and dissolution are equal. In seawater, dissolution boundary is formed as a result of temperature, pressure, and depth, and is known as the saturation horizon. Above this saturation horizon, has a value greater than 1, and CaCO_{3} does not readily dissolve. Most calcifying organisms live in such waters. Below this depth, has a value less than 1, and CaCO_{3} will dissolve. The carbonate compensation depth is the ocean depth at which carbonate dissolution balances the supply of carbonate to sea floor, therefore sediment below this depth will be void of calcium carbonate. Increasing CO_{2} levels, and the resulting lower pH of seawater, decreases the concentration of CO^{2−}_{3} and the saturation state of CaCO_{3} therefore increasing CaCO_{3} dissolution.

Calcium carbonate most commonly occurs in two common polymorphs (crystalline forms): aragonite and calcite. Aragonite is much more soluble than calcite, so the aragonite saturation horizon, and aragonite compensation depth, is always nearer to the surface than the calcite saturation horizon. This also means that those organisms that produce aragonite may be more vulnerable to changes in ocean acidity than those that produce calcite. Ocean acidification and the resulting decrease in carbonate saturation states raise the saturation horizons of both forms closer to the surface. This decrease in saturation state is one of the main factors leading to decreased calcification in marine organisms because the inorganic precipitation of CaCO_{3} is directly proportional to its saturation state and calcifying organisms exhibit stress in waters with lower saturation states.

=== Natural variability and climate feedbacks ===
Already now large quantities of water undersaturated in aragonite are upwelling close to the Pacific continental shelf area of North America, from Vancouver to Northern California. These continental shelves play an important role in marine ecosystems, since most marine organisms live or are spawned there. Other shelf areas may be experiencing similar effects.

At depths of 1000s of meters in the ocean, calcium carbonate shells begin to dissolve as increasing pressure and decreasing temperature shift the chemical equilibria controlling calcium carbonate precipitation. The depth at which this occurs is known as the carbonate compensation depth. Ocean acidification will increase such dissolution and shallow the carbonate compensation depth on timescales of tens to hundreds of years. Zones of downwelling are being affected first.

In the North Pacific and North Atlantic, saturation states are also decreasing (the depth of saturation is getting more shallow). Ocean acidification is progressing in the open ocean as the CO_{2} travels to deeper depth as a result of ocean mixing. In the open ocean, this causes carbonate compensation depths to become more shallow, meaning that dissolution of calcium carbonate will occur below those depths. In the North Pacific these carbonate saturations depths are shallowing at a rate of 1–2 m/year.

It is expected that ocean acidification in the future will lead to a significant decrease in the burial of carbonate sediments for several centuries, and even the dissolution of existing carbonate sediments.

== Measured and estimated values ==
=== Present-day and recent history ===
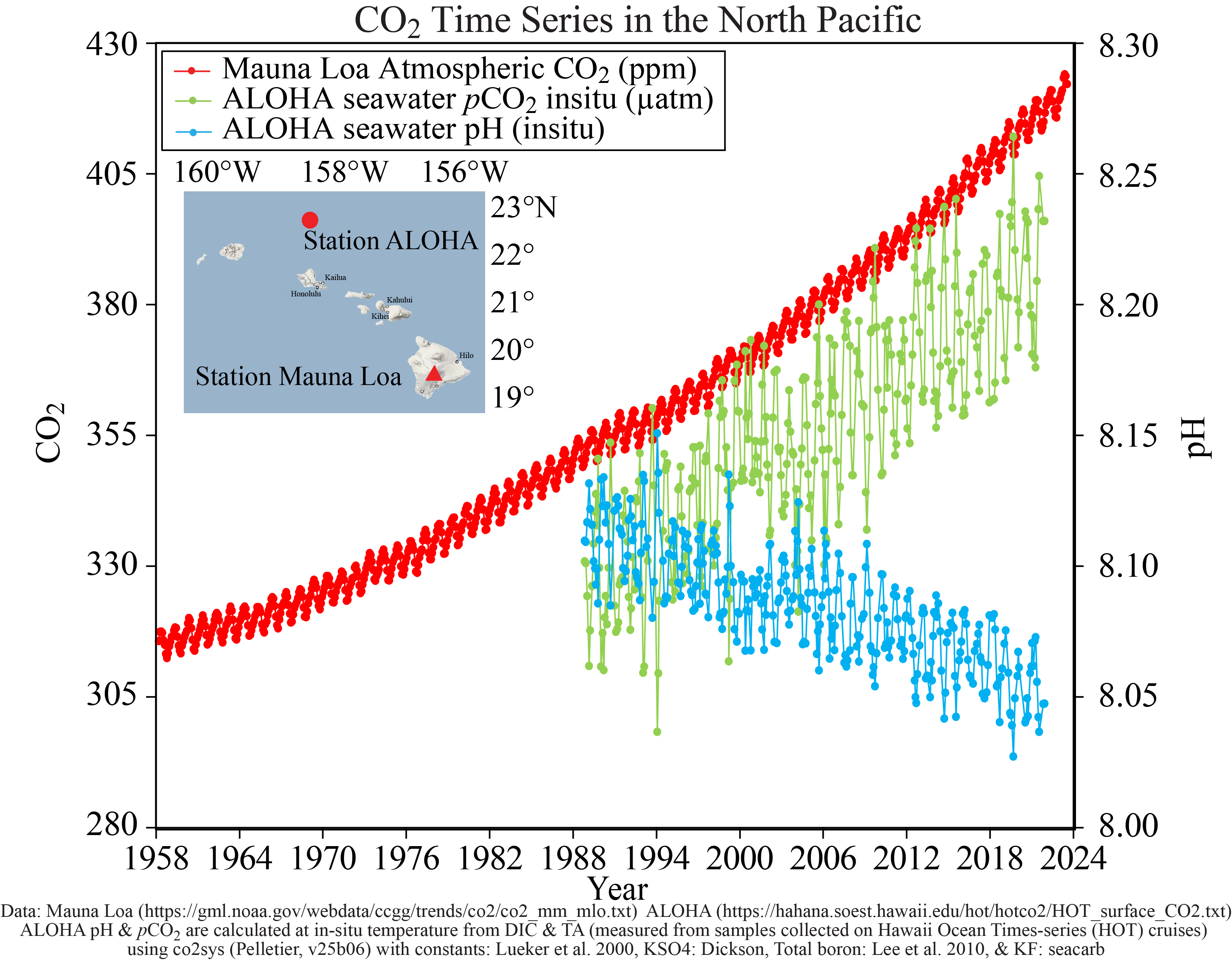
Time series of atmospheric CO_{2} at Mauna Loa (in parts per million volume, ppmv; red), surface ocean pCO_{2} (μatm; green) and surface ocean pH (blue) at Ocean Station ALOHA in the subtropical North Pacific Ocean

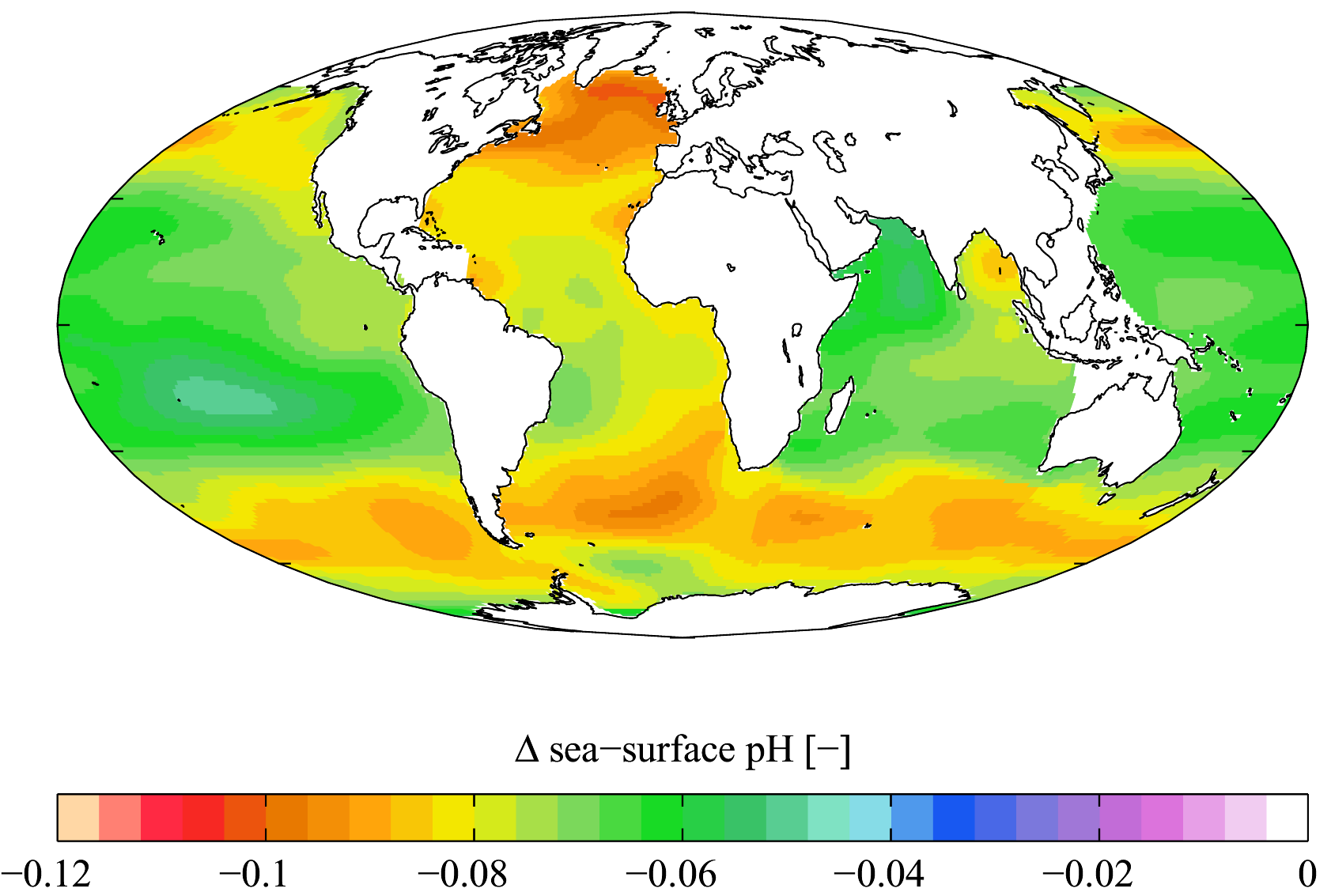
Estimated change in seawater pH caused by anthropogenic impact on CO_{2} levels between the 1700s and the 1990s, from the Global Ocean Data Analysis Project (GLODAP) and the World Ocean Atlas

Between 1950 and 2020, the average pH value of the ocean surface is estimated to have decreased from approximately 8.15 to 8.05. This represents an increase of around 26% in hydrogen ion concentration in the world's oceans (the pH scale is logarithmic, so a change of one in pH unit is equivalent to a tenfold change in hydrogen ion concentration). For example, in the 15-year period 1995–2010 alone, acidity has increased 6 percent in the upper 100 meters of the Pacific Ocean from Hawaii to Alaska.

The IPCC Sixth Assessment Report in 2021 stated that "present-day surface pH values are unprecedented for at least 26,000 years and current rates of pH change are unprecedented since at least that time. The pH value of the ocean interior has declined over the last 20–30 years everywhere in the global ocean. The report also found that "pH in open ocean surface water has declined by about 0.017 to 0.027 pH units per decade since the late 1980s".

The rate of decline differs by region. This is due to complex interactions between different types of forcing mechanisms: "In the tropical Pacific, its central and eastern upwelling zones exhibited a faster pH decline of minus 0.022 to minus 0.026 pH unit per decade." This is thought to be "due to increased upwelling of CO_{2}-rich sub-surface waters in addition to anthropogenic CO_{2} uptake". Some regions exhibited a slower acidification rate: a pH decline of minus 0.010 to minus 0.013 pH units per decade has been observed in warm pools in the western tropical Pacific.

The rate at which ocean acidification will occur may be influenced by the rate of surface ocean warming, because warm waters will not absorb as much CO_{2}. Therefore, greater seawater warming could limit CO_{2} absorption and lead to a smaller change in pH for a given increase in CO_{2}. The difference in changes in temperature between basins is one of the main reasons for the differences in acidification rates in different localities.

Current rates of ocean acidification have been likened to the greenhouse event at the Paleocene–Eocene boundary (about 56 million years ago), when surface ocean temperatures rose by 5–6 °C. In that event, surface ecosystems experienced a variety of impacts, but bottom-dwelling organisms in the deep ocean actually experienced a major extinction. Currently, the rate of carbon addition to the atmosphere-ocean system is about ten times the rate that occurred at the Paleocene–Eocene boundary.

Extensive observational systems are now in place or being built for monitoring seawater CO_{2} chemistry and acidification for both the global open ocean and some coastal systems.

Rates of increasing acidity in different marine regions
Location	Change in pH units per decade	Period	Data source	Year of publication
Iceland	minus 0.024	1984–2009	Direct measurements	2009
Drake Passage	minus 0.018	2002–2012	Direct measurements	2012
Canary (ESTOC)	minus 0.017	1995–2004	Direct measurements	2010
Hawaii (HOT)	minus 0.019	1989–2007	Direct measurements	2009
Bermuda (BATS)	minus 0.017	1984–2012	Direct measurements	2012
Coral Sea	minus 0.002	~1700 – ~1990	Proxy reconstruction	2005
Eastern Mediterranean	minus 0.023	1964–2005	Proxy reconstruction	2016

Rates of pH change for some regions of the world (Many more regions available in source table)
	Station, region	Study period	pH change per decade
Equatorial Pacific	TAO	2004–2011	−0.026
Indian Ocean	IO-STPS	1991–2011	−0.027
Mediterranean	Dyfamed (43.42°N, 7.87°E)	1995–2011	−0.03
North Atlantic	Iceland Sea (68°N, 12.67°W)	1985–2008; 1985–2010	−0.024 −0.014
North Atlantic	Irminger Sea (64.3°N, 28°W)	1983–2004	−0.026
North Pacific	NP-STSS	1991–2011	−0.01
Southern Ocean	PAL-LTER, west Antarctic Peninsula	1993–2012	+0.02

=== Geologic past ===
Ocean acidification has occurred previously in Earth's history. It happened during the Capitanian mass extinction, at the end-Permian extinction, during the end-Triassic extinction, and during the Cretaceous–Paleogene extinction event.

Three of the big five mass extinction events in the geologic past were associated with a rapid increase in atmospheric carbon dioxide, probably due to volcanism and/or thermal dissociation of marine gas hydrates. Elevated CO_{2} levels impacted biodiversity. Decreased CaCO_{3} saturation due to seawater uptake of volcanogenic CO_{2} has been suggested as a possible kill mechanism during the marine mass extinction at the end of the Triassic. The end-Triassic biotic crisis is still the most well-established example of a marine mass extinction due to ocean acidification, because (a) carbon isotope records suggest enhanced volcanic activity that decreased the carbonate sedimentation which reduced the carbonate compensation depth and the carbonate saturation state, and a marine extinction coincided precisely in the stratigraphic record, and (b) there was pronounced selectivity of the extinction against organisms with thick aragonitic skeletons, which is predicted from experimental studies. Ocean acidification has also been suggested as a one cause of the end-Permian mass extinction and the end-Cretaceous crisis. Overall, multiple climatic stressors, including ocean acidification, was likely the cause of geologic extinction events.

The most notable example of ocean acidification is the Paleocene–Eocene Thermal Maximum (PETM), which occurred approximately 56 million years ago when massive amounts of carbon entered the ocean and atmosphere, and led to the dissolution of carbonate sediments across many ocean basins. Relatively new geochemical methods of testing for pH in the past indicate the pH dropped 0.3 units across the PETM. One study that solves the marine carbonate system for saturation state shows that it may not change much over the PETM, suggesting the rate of carbon release at our best geological analogy was much slower than human-induced carbon emissions. However, stronger proxy methods to test for saturation state are needed to assess how much this pH change may have affected calcifying organisms.

== Predicted future values ==
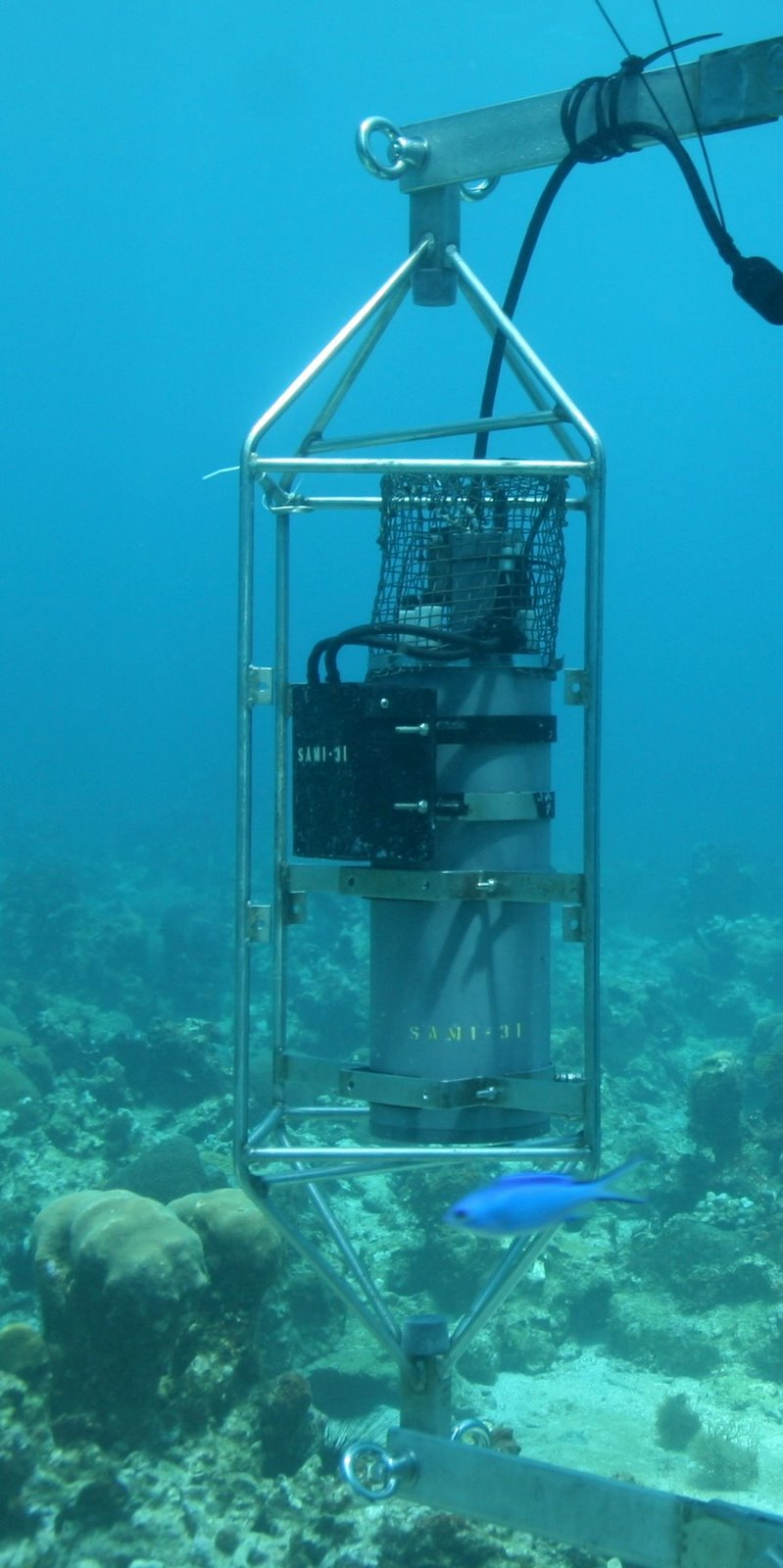
In situ CO_{2} concentration sensor (SAMI-CO_{2}), attached to a Coral Reef Early Warning System station, utilized in conducting ocean acidification studies near coral reef areas (by NOAA (AOML))

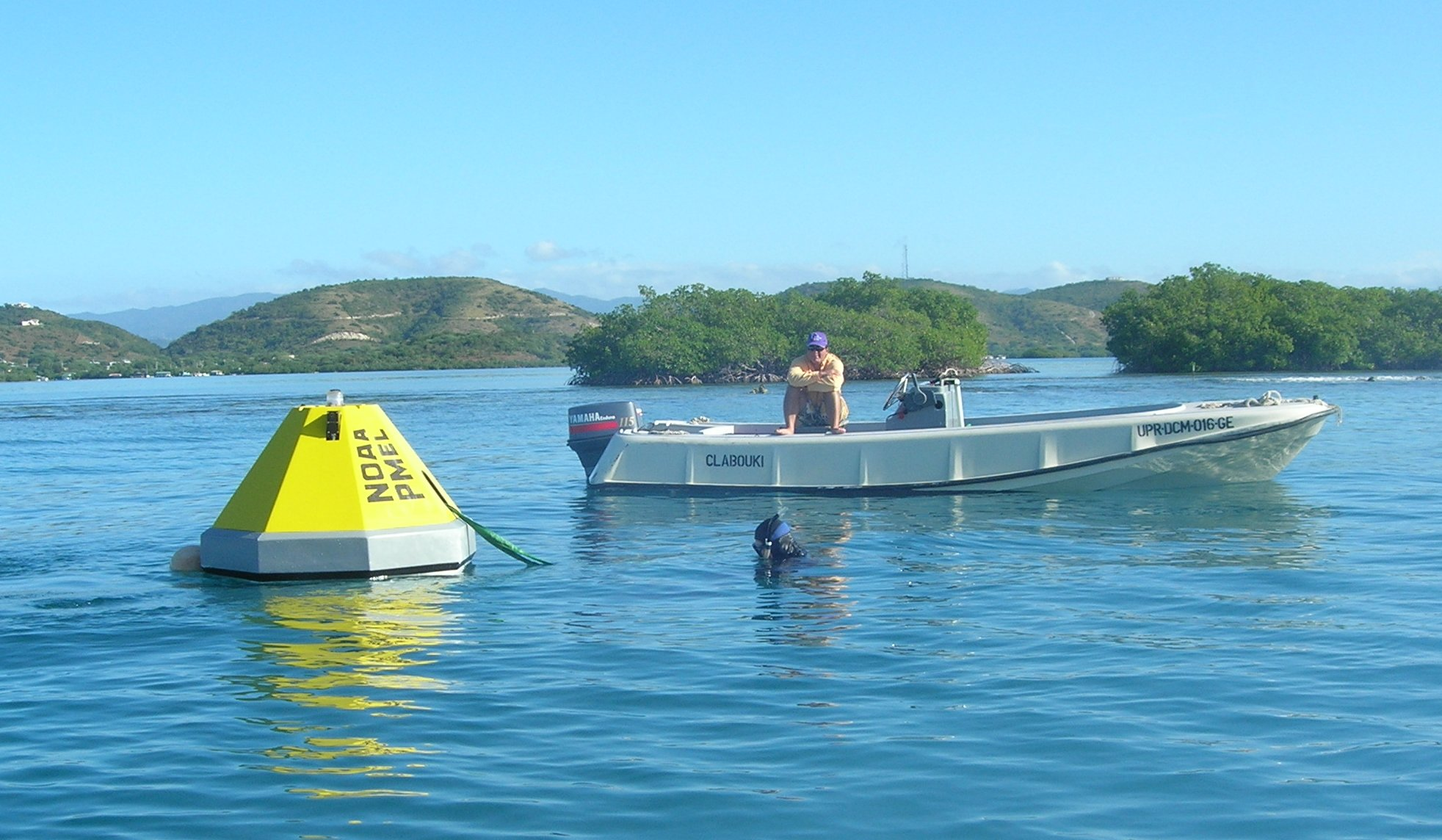
A moored autonomous CO_{2} buoy used for measuring CO_{2} concentration and ocean acidification studies (NOAA (by PMEL))

Importantly, the rate of change in ocean acidification is much higher than in the geological past. This faster change prevents organisms from gradually adapting, and prevents climate cycle feedbacks from kicking in to mitigate ocean acidification. Ocean acidification is now on a path to reach lower pH levels than at any other point in the last 300 million years. The rate of ocean acidification (i.e. the rate of change in pH value) is also estimated to be unprecedented over that same time scale. These expected changes are considered unprecedented in the geological record. In combination with other ocean biogeochemical changes, this drop in pH value could undermine the functioning of marine ecosystems and disrupt the provision of many goods and services associated with the ocean, beginning as early as 2100.

The extent of further ocean chemistry changes, including ocean pH, will depend on climate change mitigation efforts taken by nations and their governments. Different scenarios of projected socioeconomic global changes are modelled by using the Shared Socioeconomic Pathways (SSP) scenarios.

Under a very high emission scenario (SSP5-8.5), model projections estimate that surface ocean pH could decrease by as much as 0.44 units by the end of this century, compared to the end of the 19th century. This would mean a pH as low as about 7.7, and represents a further increase in H+ concentrations of two to four times beyond the increase to date.

Estimated past and future global mean surface pH for different emission scenarios
Time period	Ocean surface pH value (approx.)
Pre-industrial (1850)	8.17
Current (2021)	8.08
Future (2100) with low emission scenario (SSP 1–2.6)	8.0
Future (2100) with very high emission scenario (SSP 5–8.5)	7.7

== Impacts on oceanic calcifying organisms ==
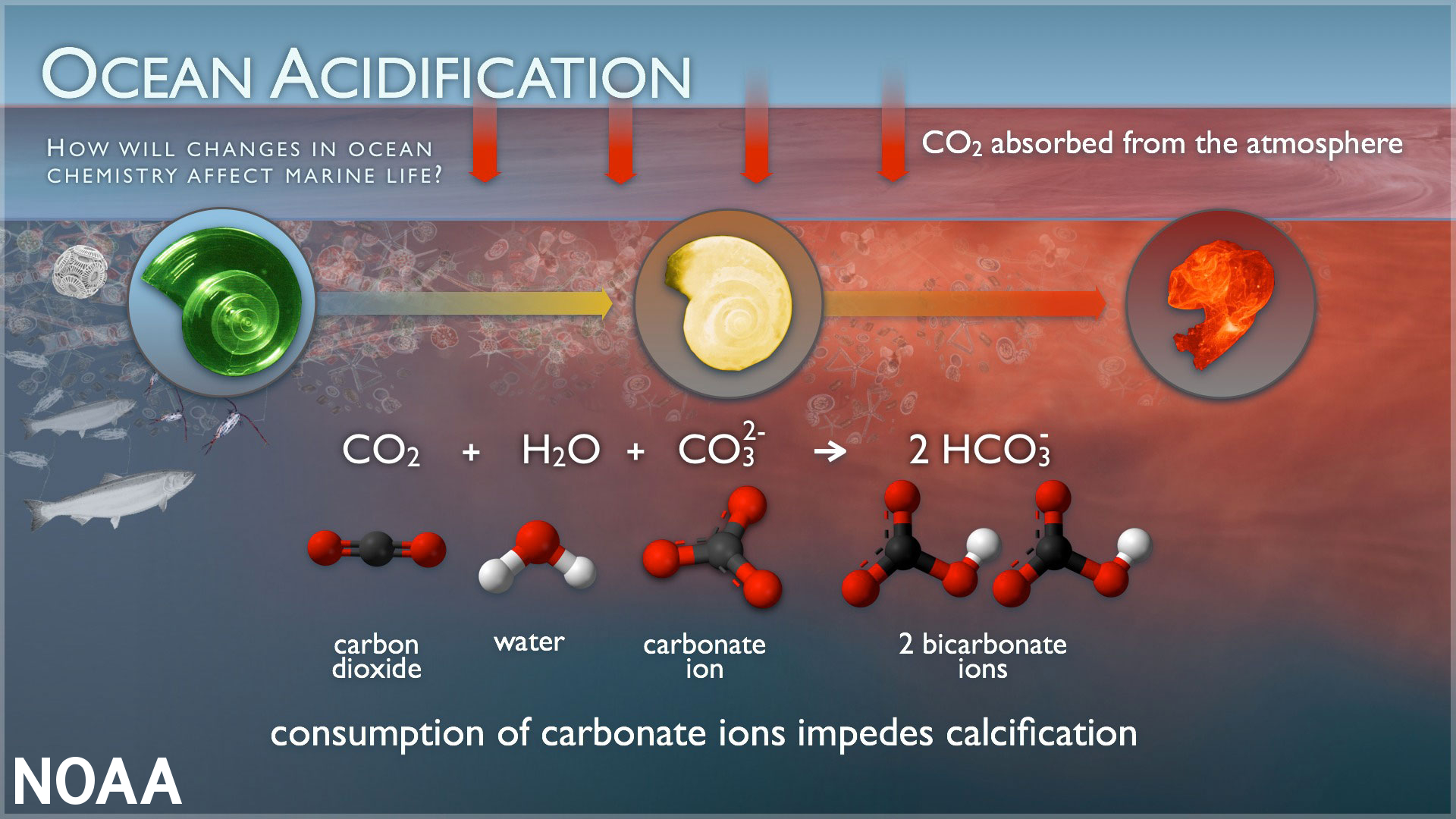
A pteropod shell is shown dissolving over time in seawater with a lower pH. When carbon dioxide is absorbed by the ocean from the atmosphere, the chemistry of the seawater is changed (source: NOAA)

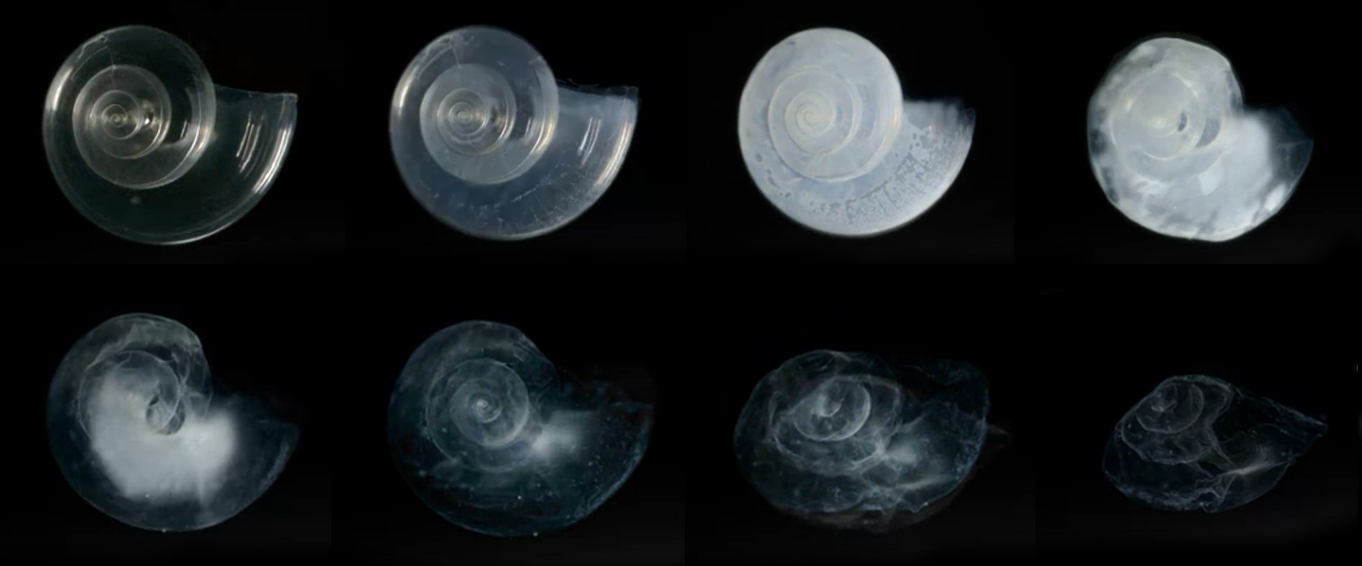
Pterapod shell dissolved in seawater adjusted to an ocean chemistry projected for the year 2100 (source: NOAA).

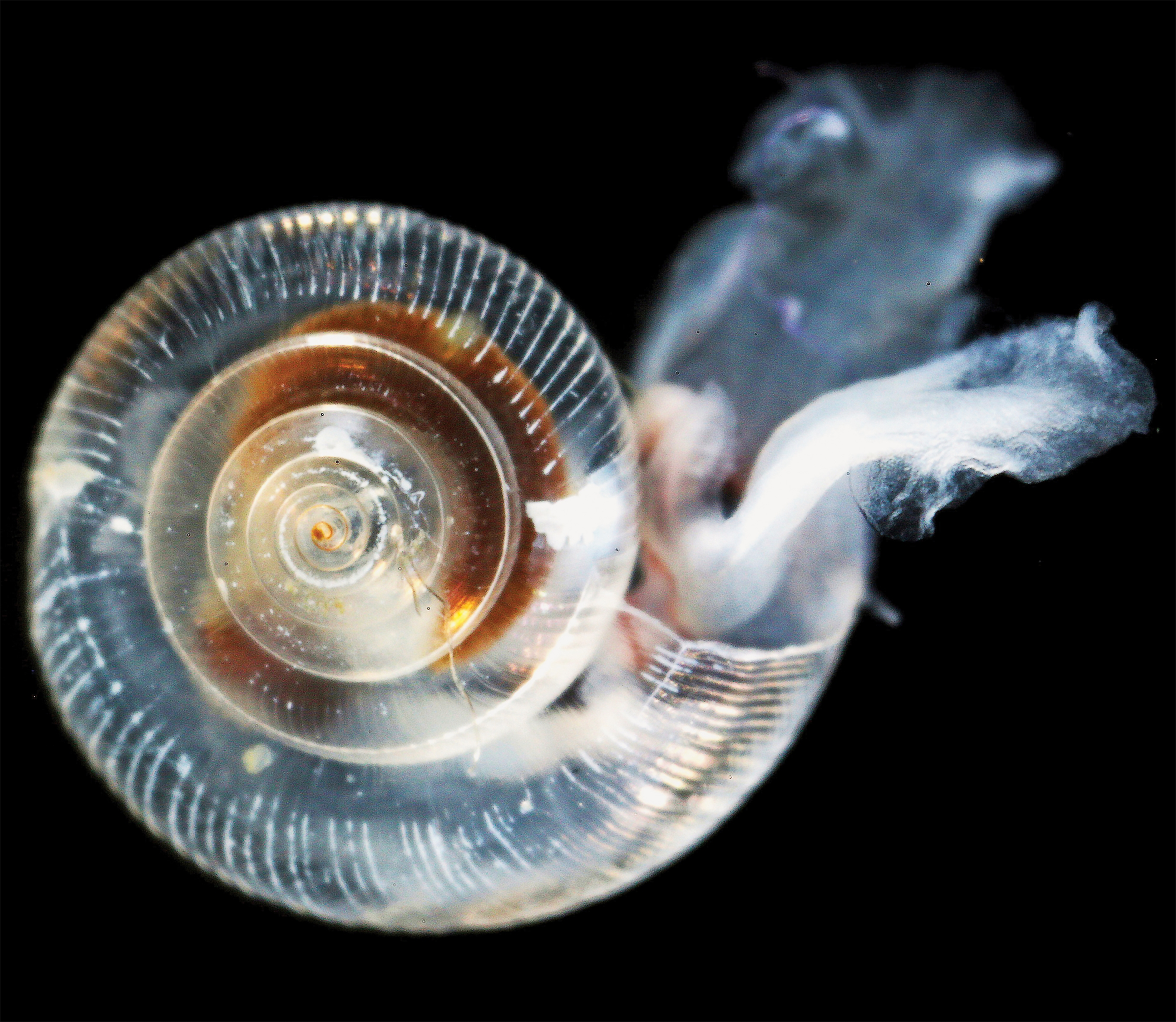
Unhealthy pteropod showing effects of ocean acidification including ragged, dissolving shell ridges on upper surface, a cloudy shell in lower right quadrant, and severe abrasions and weak spots at 6:30 position on lower whorl of shell (source: NOAA)

=== Complexity of research findings ===
The full ecological consequences of the changes in calcification due to ocean acidification are complex but it appears likely that many calcifying species will be adversely affected by ocean acidification. Increasing ocean acidification makes it more difficult for shell-accreting organisms to access carbonate ions, essential for the production of their hard exoskeletal shell. Oceanic calcifying organism span the food chain from autotrophs to heterotrophs and include organisms such as coccolithophores, corals, foraminifera, echinoderms, crustaceans, and molluscs.

Overall, all marine ecosystems on Earth will be exposed to changes in acidification and several other ocean biogeochemical changes. Ocean acidification may force some organisms to reallocate resources away from productive endpoints in order to maintain calcification. For example, the oyster Magallana gigas is recognized to experience metabolic changes alongside altered calcification rates due to energetic tradeoffs resulting from pH imbalances.

Under normal conditions, calcite and aragonite are stable in surface waters since the carbonate ions are supersaturated with respect to seawater. However, as ocean pH falls, the concentration of carbonate ions also decreases. Calcium carbonate thus becomes undersaturated, and structures made of calcium carbonate are vulnerable to calcification stress and dissolution. In particular, studies show that corals, coccolithophores, coralline algae, foraminifera, shellfish and pteropods experience reduced calcification or enhanced dissolution when exposed to elevated CO_{2}. Even with active marine conservation practices it may be impossible to bring back many previous shellfish populations.

Some studies have found different responses to ocean acidification, with coccolithophore calcification and photosynthesis both increasing under elevated atmospheric pCO_{2}, and an equal decline in primary production and calcification in response to elevated CO_{2}, or the direction of the response varying between species.

Similarly, the sea star, Pisaster ochraceus, shows enhanced growth in waters with increased acidity.

Reduced calcification from ocean acidification may affect the ocean's biologically driven sequestration of carbon from the atmosphere to the ocean interior and seafloor sediment, weakening the so-called biological pump. Seawater acidification could also reduce the size of Antarctic phytoplankton, making them less effective at storing carbon. Such changes are being increasingly studied and synthesized through the use of physiological frameworks, including the Adverse Outcome Pathway (AOP) framework.

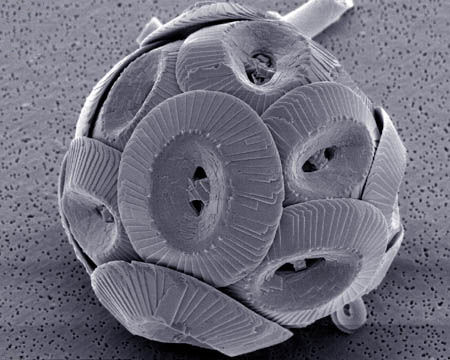
Coccolithus pelagicus, a species of coccolithophore sampled from the North Atlantic Ocean

Life-cycle assessment (LCA) and life-cycle impact assessments (LCIA) methods can be used to estimate potential marine biodiversity damage driven by emissions through the ocean acidification pathway. These methods combine modeled changes in seawater chemistry with data on the sensitivity of marine organisms. A 2025 study developed spatially differentiated characterization factors for carbon dioxide, carbon monoxide, and methane emissions across 232 coastal marine ecoregions and 18 open-ocean fishing areas. The resulting estimates showed substantial geographical variation in potential biodiversity impacts.

=== Coccolithophores ===
A coccolithophore is a unicellular, eukaryotic phytoplankton (alga). Understanding calcification changes in coccolithophores may be particularly important because a decline in the coccolithophores may have secondary effects on climate: it could contribute to global warming by decreasing the Earth's albedo via their effects on oceanic cloud cover. A study in 2008 examined a sediment core from the North Atlantic and found that the species composition of coccolithophorids remained unchanged over the past 224 years (1780 to 2004). But the average coccolith mass had increased by 40% during the same period.

=== Corals ===
Warm water corals are clearly in decline, with losses of 50% over the last 30–50 years due to multiple threats from ocean warming, ocean acidification, pollution, and physical damage from activities such as fishing, and these pressures are expected to intensify.

The fluid in the internal compartments (the coelenteron) where corals grow their exoskeleton is also extremely important for calcification growth. When the saturation state of aragonite in the external seawater is at ambient levels, the corals will grow their aragonite crystals rapidly in their internal compartments, hence their exoskeleton grows rapidly. If the saturation state of aragonite in the external seawater is lower than the ambient level, the corals have to work harder to maintain the right balance in the internal compartment. When that happens, the process of growing the crystals slows down, and this slows down the rate of how much their exoskeleton is growing. Depending on the aragonite saturation state in the surrounding water, the corals may halt growth because pumping aragonite into the internal compartment will not be energetically favorable. Under the current progression of carbon emissions, around 70% of North Atlantic cold-water corals will be living in corrosive waters by 2050–60.

Acidified conditions primarily reduce the coral's capacity to build dense exoskeletons, rather than affecting the linear extension of the exoskeleton. The density of some species of corals could be reduced by over 20% by the end of this century.

An in situ experiment, conducted on a 400 m2 patch of the Great Barrier Reef, to decrease seawater CO_{2} level (raise pH) to near the preindustrial value showed a 7% increase in net calcification. A similar experiment to raise in situ seawater CO_{2} level (lower pH) to a level expected soon after the 2050 found that net calcification decreased 34%.

However, a field study of the coral reef in Queensland and Western Australia from 2007 to 2012 found that corals are more resistant to the environmental pH changes than previously thought, due to internal homeostasis regulation; this makes thermal change (marine heatwaves), which leads to coral bleaching, rather than acidification, the main factor for coral reef vulnerability due to climate change.

==== Studies at carbon dioxide seep sites ====
In some places carbon dioxide bubbles out from the sea floor, locally changing the pH and other aspects of the chemistry of the seawater. Studies of these carbon dioxide seeps have documented a variety of responses by different organisms. Coral reef communities located near carbon dioxide seeps are of particular interest because of the sensitivity of some corals species to acidification. In Papua New Guinea, declining pH caused by carbon dioxide seeps is associated with declines in coral species diversity. However, in Palau carbon dioxide seeps are not associated with reduced species diversity of corals, although bioerosion of coral skeletons is much higher at low pH sites.

=== Pteropods and brittle stars ===
Pteropods and brittle stars both form the base of the Arctic food webs and are both seriously damaged from acidification. Pteropods shells dissolve with increasing acidification and the brittle stars lose muscle mass when re-growing appendages. For pteropods to create shells they require aragonite which is produced through carbonate ions and dissolved calcium and strontium. Pteropods are severely affected because increasing acidification levels have steadily decreased the amount of water supersaturated with carbonate. The degradation of organic matter in Arctic waters has amplified ocean acidification; some Arctic waters are already undersaturated with respect to aragonite.

The brittle star's eggs die within a few days when exposed to expected conditions resulting from Arctic acidification. Similarly, when exposed in experiments to pH reduced by 0.2 to 0.4, larvae of a temperate brittle star, a relative of the common sea star, fewer than 0.1 percent survived more than eight days.

== Other impacts on ecosystems ==
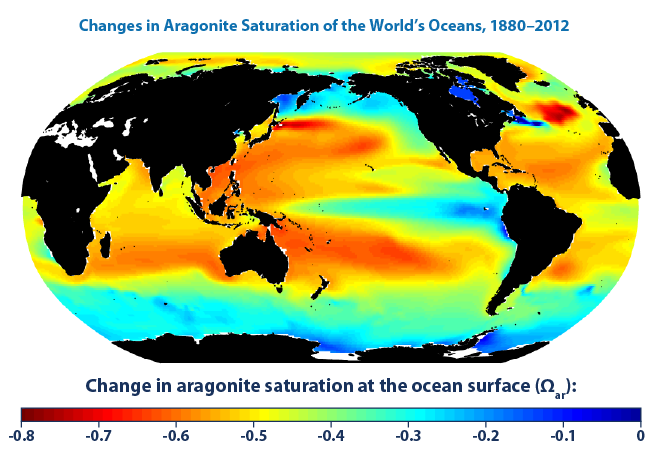
This map shows changes in the aragonite saturation level of ocean surface waters between the 1880s and 2006–2015. Aragonite is a form of calcium carbonate that many marine animals use to build their skeletons and shells. The lower the saturation level, the more difficult it is for organisms to build and maintain their skeletons and shells. A negative change represents a decrease in saturation.

=== Other biological impacts ===
Aside from the slowing and/or reversal of calcification, organisms may suffer other adverse effects, either indirectly through negative impacts on food resources, or directly as reproductive or physiological effects. For example, the elevated oceanic levels of CO_{2} may produce CO_{2}-induced acidification of body fluids, known as hypercapnia. Increasing acidity has been observed to reduce metabolic rates in jumbo squid and depress the immune responses of blue mussels. Atlantic longfin squid eggs took longer to hatch in acidified water, and the squid's statolith was smaller and malformed in animals placed in sea water with a lower pH. However, these studies are ongoing and there is not yet a full understanding of these processes in marine organisms or ecosystems.

==== Acoustic properties ====
Another potential route to ecosystem impacts is through bioacoustics. This may occur as ocean acidification can alter the acoustic properties of seawater, allowing sound to propagate further, and increasing ocean noise. This impacts all animals that use sound for echolocation or communication.

==== Algae and seagrasses ====
Another possible effect would be an increase in harmful algal bloom events, which could contribute to the accumulation of toxins (domoic acid, brevetoxin, saxitoxin) in small organisms such as anchovies and shellfish, in turn increasing occurrences of amnesic shellfish poisoning, neurotoxic shellfish poisoning, and paralytic shellfish poisoning. Although algal blooms can be harmful, other beneficial photosynthetic organisms may benefit from increased levels of carbon dioxide. Most importantly, seagrasses will benefit. Research found that as seagrasses increased their photosynthetic activity, calcifying algae's calcification rates rose, likely because localized photosynthetic activity absorbed carbon dioxide and elevated local pH.

==== Fish larvae ====
Ocean acidification can also impact marine fish larvae. It internally affects their olfactory systems, which is a crucial part of their early development. Orange clownfish larvae mostly live on oceanic reefs that are surrounded by vegetative islands. Larvae are known to use their sense of smell to detect the differences between reefs surrounded by vegetative islands and reefs not surrounded by vegetative islands. Clownfish larvae need to be able to distinguish between these two destinations to find a suitable area for their growth. Another use for marine fish olfactory systems is to distinguish between their parents and other adult fish, in order to avoid inbreeding.

In an experimental aquarium facility, clownfish were sustained in non-manipulated seawater with pH 8.15 ± 0.07, which is similar to our current ocean's pH. To test for effects of different pH levels, the seawater was modified to two other pH levels, which corresponded with climate change models that predict future atmospheric CO_{2} levels. In the year 2100 the model projects possible CO_{2} levels of 1,000 ppm, which correlates with the pH of 7.8 ± 0.05.

This experiment showed that when larvae are exposed to a pH of 7.8 ± 0.05 their reaction to environmental cues differs drastically from their reaction to cues at pH equal to current ocean levels. At pH 7.6 ± 0.05 larvae had no reaction to any type of cue. However, a meta-analysis published in 2022 found that the effect sizes of published studies testing for ocean acidification effects on fish behavior have declined by an order of magnitude over the past decade, and have been negligible for the past five years.

Eel embryos, a "critically endangered" species yet profound in aquaculture, are also being affected by ocean acidification, specifically the European eel. Although they spend most of their lives in fresh water, usually in rivers, streams, or estuaries, they go to spawn and die in the Sargasso Sea. Here is where European eels are experiencing the effects of acidification in one of their key life stages.

Fish embryos and larvae are usually more sensitive to pH changes than adults, as organs for pH regulation are not full developed. Because of this, European eel embryos are more vulnerable to changes in pH in the Sargasso Sea. A study of the European Eel in the Sargasso Sea was conducted in 2021 to analyze the specific effects of ocean acidification on embryos. The study found that exposure to predicted end-of-century ocean pCO_{2} conditions may affect normal development of this species in nature during sensitive early life history stages with limited physiological response capacities, while extreme acidification would negatively influence embryonic survival and development under hatchery conditions.

=== Compounded effects of acidification, warming, and deoxygenation ===
Drivers of hypoxia and ocean acidification intensification in upwelling shelf systems. Equatorward winds drive the upwelling of low dissolved oxygen (DO), high nutrient, and high dissolved inorganic carbon (DIC) water from above the oxygen minimum zone. Cross-shelf gradients in productivity and bottom water residence times drive the strength of DO (DIC) decrease (increase) as water transits across a productive continental shelf.

There is a substantial body of research showing that a combination of ocean acidification and elevated ocean temperature have a compounded effect on marine life and the ocean environment. This effect far exceeds the individual harmful impact of either. In addition, ocean warming, along with increased productivity of phytoplankton from higher CO_{2} levels exacerbates ocean deoxygenation. Deoxygenation of ocean waters is an additional stressor on marine organisms that increases ocean stratification therefore limiting nutrients over time and reducing biological gradients.

Meta analyses have quantified the direction and magnitude of the harmful effects of combined ocean acidification, warming, and deoxygenation on the ocean. These meta-analyses have been further tested by mesocosm studies that simulated the interaction of these stressors and found a catastrophic effect on the marine food web: thermal stress more than negates any primary producer to herbivore increase in productivity from elevated CO_{2}.

== Impacts on the economy and societies ==
The increase of ocean acidity decelerates the rate of calcification in salt water, leading to smaller and slower growing coral reefs which supports approximately 25% of marine life. Impacts are far-reaching from fisheries and coastal environments down to the deepest depths of the ocean. The increase in ocean acidity is not only killing the coral, but also the wildly diverse population of marine inhabitants which coral reefs support.

=== Fishing and tourism industry ===
The threat of acidification includes a decline in commercial fisheries and the coast-based tourism industry. Several ocean goods and services are likely to be undermined by future ocean acidification potentially affecting the livelihoods of some 470 to 870 million of the world's poorest people, depending upon the greenhouse gas emission scenario.

Some 1 billion people are completely or partially dependent on the fishing, tourism, and coastal management services provided by coral reefs. Ongoing acidification of the oceans may therefore threaten future food chains linked with the oceans.

==== Arctic ====
In the Arctic, commercial fisheries are threatened because acidification harms calcifying organisms which form the base of the Arctic food webs (pteropods and brittle stars, see above). Acidification threatens Arctic food webs from the base up. Arctic food webs are considered simple, meaning there are few steps in the food chain from small organisms to larger predators. For example, pteropods are "a key prey item of a number of higher predators – larger plankton, fish, seabirds, whales". Both pteropods and sea stars serve as a substantial food source and their removal from the simple food web would pose a serious threat to the whole ecosystem. The effects on the calcifying organisms at the base of the food webs could potentially destroy fisheries.

==== United Kingdom commercial fisheries ====
The shellfish industry is an important part of the United Kingdom economy. In 2013, the shellfish industry contributed 37% of total landings by value. England and Scotland are the highest producers of shellfish within the United Kingdom. It has been found that annually fishers catch 66,000 tons and 61,000 tons. In terms of value, the wild-captured shellfish are worth 203 million pounds per year. However, ocean acidification is causing a decrease in the growth of many shellfish species. This is causing a drastic economic loss in the United Kingdom economy.

It is predicted that by 2100 there will be an economy-wide economic loss of shellfish production in the United Kingdom. The direct potential loss ranges from 14 to 28 percent of fishery output. That is a total loss of about 23 to 88 million pounds. The financial losses vary regionally due to different patterns of wild-caught shellfish and the exploitation of species with differing sensitivities to ocean acidification. Shellfish resources in the United Kingdom will require regional, national, or international solutions to reduce the impacts of ocean acidification on shellfish species and stabilize the economy.

==== US commercial fisheries ====
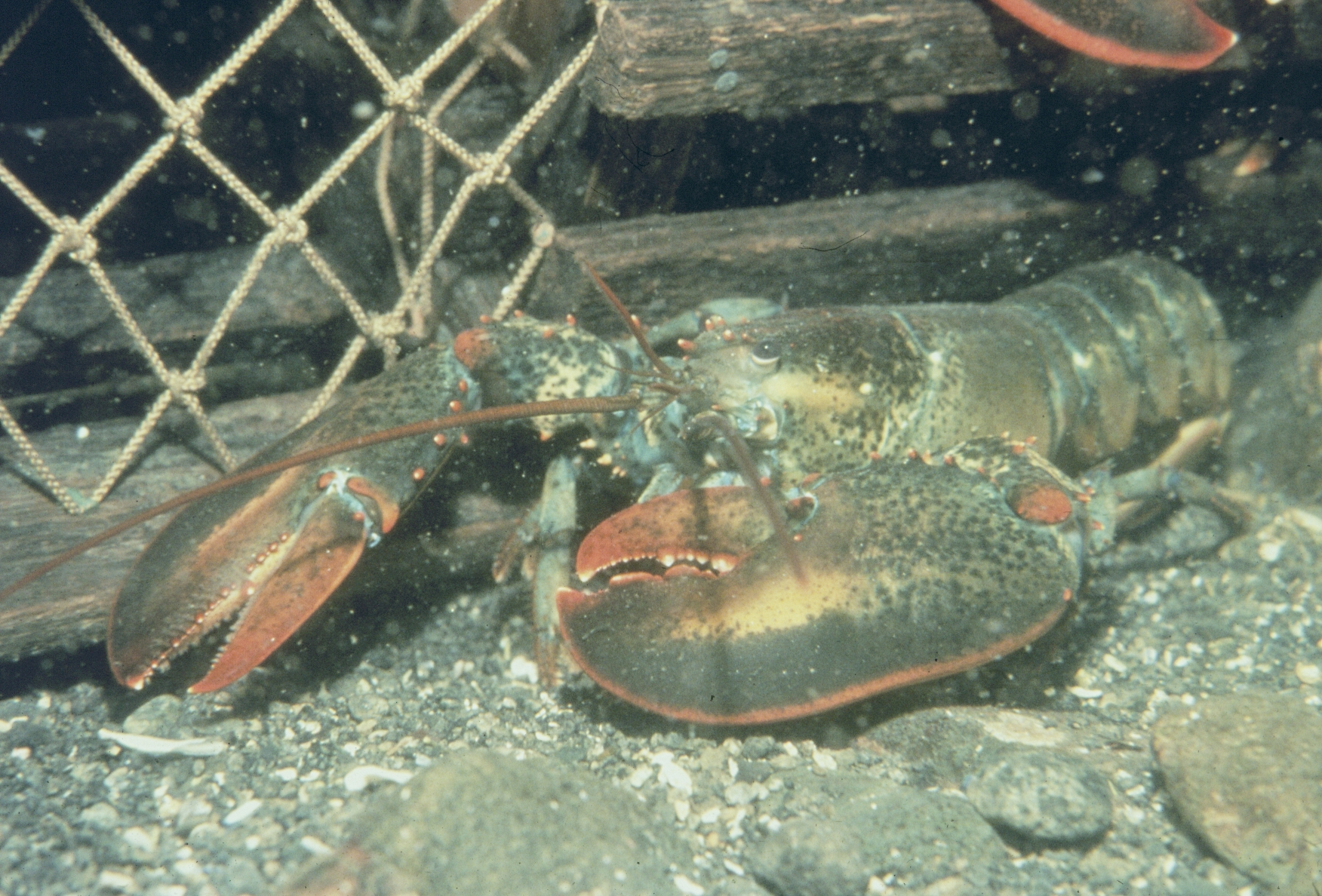
An adult American lobster rests on the sea floor. Rhode Island, Dutch Island, Newport County.

The value of fish caught from US commercial fisheries in 2007 was valued at $3.8 billion and of that 73% was derived from calcifiers and their direct predators. Other organisms are directly harmed as a result of acidification. For example, decrease in the growth of marine calcifiers such as the American lobster, ocean quahog, and scallops means there is less shellfish meat available for sale and consumption. Red king crab fisheries are also at a serious threat because crabs are also calcifiers. Baby red king crab when exposed to increased acidification levels experienced 100% mortality after 95 days. In 2006, red king crab accounted for 23% of the total guideline harvest levels and a serious decline in red crab population would threaten the crab harvesting industry.

== Possible responses ==
=== Climate change mitigation ===
Reducing carbon dioxide emissions (i.e. climate change mitigation measures) is the only solution that addresses the root cause of ocean acidification. For example, some mitigation measures focus on carbon dioxide removal (CDR) from the atmosphere (e.g. direct air capture (DAC), bioenergy with carbon capture and storage (BECCS)). These would also slow the rate of acidification.

Approaches that remove carbon dioxide from the ocean include ocean nutrient fertilization, artificial upwelling and/or downwelling, seaweed farming, ecosystem recovery, ocean alkalinity enhancement, enhanced weathering, and electrochemical processes. All of these methods use the ocean to remove CO_{2} from the atmosphere to store it in the ocean. These methods could assist with mitigation but they can have side-effects on marine life. The research field for all CDR methods has grown a lot since 2019.

In total, "ocean-based methods have a combined potential to remove 1–100 gigatons of CO_{2} per year". Their costs are in the order of US$40–500 per ton of CO_{2}. For example, enhanced weathering could remove 2–4 gigatons of CO_{2} per year. This technology comes with a cost of US$50–200 per ton of CO_{2}.

=== Carbon removal technologies which add alkalinity ===
Some carbon removal techniques add alkalinity to the ocean and therefore immediately buffer pH changes which might help the organisms in the region that the extra alkalinity is added to. The two technologies that fall into this category are ocean alkalinity enhancement and electrochemical methods. Eventually, due to diffusion, that alkalinity addition will be quite small to distant waters. This is why the term local ocean acidification mitigation is used. Both of these technologies have the potential to operate on a large scale and to be efficient at removing carbon dioxide. However, they are expensive, have many risks and side effects, and currently have a low technology readiness level.

==== Ocean alkalinity enhancement ====
Ocean alkalinity enhancement (OAE) is a proposed "carbon dioxide removal (CDR) method that involves deposition of alkaline minerals or their dissociation products at the ocean surface". The process would increase surface total alkalinity. It would work to increase ocean absorption of CO_{2}. The process involves increasing the amount of bicarbonate (HCO^{−}_{3}) through accelerated weathering (enhanced weathering) of rocks (silicate, limestone, and quicklime). This process mimics the silicate-carbonate cycle. The CO_{2} either becomes bicarbonate, remaining in that form for more than 100 years, or may precipitate into calcium carbonate (CaCO_{3}). When calcium carbonate is buried in the deep ocean, it can hold the carbon indefinitely when utilizing silicate rocks.

Enhanced weathering is one type of ocean alkalinity enhancement. Enhanced weathering increases alkalinity by scattering fine rock particles. This can happen on land and in the ocean (even though the outcome eventually affects the ocean).

In addition to sequestering CO_{2}, alkalinity addition buffers the pH of the ocean therefore reducing ocean acidification. However, little is known about how organisms respond to added alkalinity, even from natural sources. For example, weathering of some silicate rocks could release a large amount of trace metals at the weathering site.

Cost and energy consumed by ocean alkalinity enhancement (mining, pulverizing, transport) is high compared to other CDR techniques. The cost is estimated to be US$20–50 per ton of CO_{2} (for "direct addition of alkaline minerals to the ocean").

Carbon sequestered as bicarbonate in the ocean amounts to about 30% of carbon emissions since the Industrial Revolution.

Experimental materials include limestone, brucite, olivine, and alkaline solutions. Another approach is to use electricity to raise alkalinity during desalination to capture waterborne CO_{2}.

==== Electrochemical methods ====
Electrochemical methods, or electrolysis, can strip carbon dioxide directly from seawater. Electrochemical process are a type of ocean alkalinity enhancement, too. Some methods focus on direct CO_{2} removal (in the form of carbonate and CO_{2} gas) while others increase the alkalinity of seawater by precipitating metal hydroxide residues, which absorbs CO_{2} in a matter described in the ocean alkalinity enhancement section. The hydrogen produced during direct carbon capture can then be upcycled to form hydrogen for energy consumption, or other manufactured laboratory reagents such as hydrochloric acid.

However, implementation of electrolysis for carbon capture is expensive and the energy consumed for the process is high compared to other CDR techniques. In addition, research to assess the environmental impact of this process is ongoing. Some complications include toxic chemicals in wastewaters, and reduced DIC in effluents; both of these may negatively impact marine life.

== Policies and goals ==
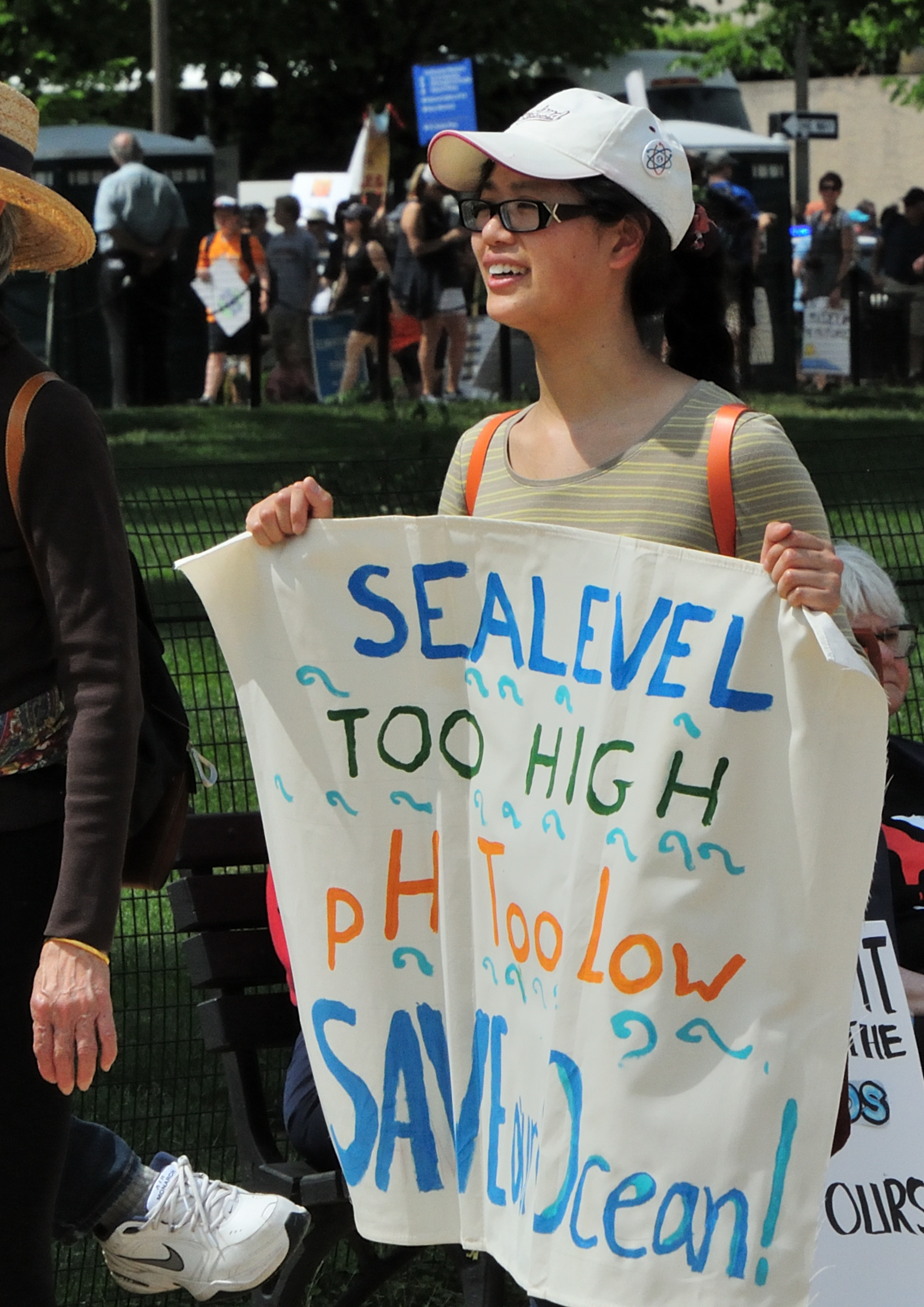
Demonstrator calling for action against ocean acidification at the People's Climate March (2017)

=== Global policies ===
As awareness about ocean acidification grows, policies geared toward increasing monitoring efforts of ocean acidification have been drafted. Previously in 2015, ocean scientist Jean-Pierre Gattuso had remarked that "The ocean has been minimally considered at previous climate negotiations. Our study provides compelling arguments for a radical change at the UN conference (in Paris) on climate change".

International efforts, such as the Wider Caribbean's Cartagena Convention (entered into force in 1986), may enhance the support provided by regional governments to highly vulnerable areas in response to ocean acidification. Many countries, for example in the Pacific Islands and Territories, have constructed regional policies, or National Ocean Policies, National Action Plans, National Adaptation Plans of Action and Joint National Action Plans on Climate Change and Disaster Risk Reduction, to help work toward SDG 14. Ocean acidification is now starting to be considered within those frameworks.

==== UN Ocean Decade ====
The UN Ocean Decade has a program called "Ocean acidification research for sustainability". It was proposed by the Global Ocean Acidification Observing Network (GOA-ON) and its partners, and has been formally endorsed as a program of the UN Decade of Ocean Science for Sustainable Development. The OARS program builds on the work of GOA-ON and has the following aims: to further develop the science of ocean acidification; to increase observations of ocean chemistry changes; to identify the impacts on marine ecosystems on local and global scales; and to provide decision makers with the information needed to mitigate and adapt to ocean acidification.

==== Global Climate Indicators ====
The importance of ocean acidification is reflected in its inclusion as one of seven Global Climate Indicators. These Indicators are a set of parameters that describe the changing climate without reducing climate change to only rising temperature. The indicators include key information for the most relevant domains of climate change: temperature and energy, atmospheric composition, ocean and water as well as the cryosphere. The Global Climate Indicators have been identified by scientists and communication specialists in a process led by Global Climate Observing System (GCOS). The Indicators have been endorsed by the World Meteorological Organization (WMO). They form the basis of the annual WMO Statement of the State of the Global Climate, which is submitted to the Conference of Parties (COP) of the United Nations Framework Convention on Climate Change (UNFCCC). Additionally, the Copernicus Climate Change Service (C3S) of the European Commission uses the Indicators for their annual "European State of the Climate".

==== Sustainable Development Goal 14 ====
In 2015, the United Nations adopted the 2030 Agenda and a set of 17 Sustainable Development Goals (SDG), including a goal dedicated to the ocean, Sustainable Development Goal 14, which calls to "conserve and sustainably use the oceans, seas, and marine resources for sustainable development". Ocean acidification is directly addressed by the target SDG 14.3. The full title of Target 14.3 is: "Minimize and address the impacts of ocean acidification, including through enhanced scientific cooperation at all levels". This target has one indicator: Indicator 14.3.1 which calls for the "Average marine acidity (pH) measured at agreed suite of representative sampling stations".

The Intergovernmental Oceanographic Commission (IOC) of UNESCO was identified as the custodian agency for the SDG 14.3.1 Indicator. In this role, IOC-UNESCO is tasked with developing the SDG 14.3.1 Indicator Methodology, the annual collection of data toward the SDG 14.3.1 Indicator and the reporting of progress to the United Nations.

=== Policies at country level ===
==== United States ====
In the United States, the Federal Ocean Acidification Research And Monitoring Act of 2009 supports government coordination, such as the National Oceanic Atmospheric Administration's (NOAA) "Ocean Acidification Program". In 2015, USEPA denied a citizens petition that asked EPA to regulate CO_{2} under the Toxic Substances Control Act of 1976 in order to mitigate ocean acidification. In the denial, the EPA said that risks from ocean acidification were being "more efficiently and effectively addressed" under domestic actions, e.g., under the Presidential Climate Action Plan, and that multiple avenues are being pursued to work with and in other nations to reduce emissions and deforestation and promote clean energy and energy efficiency.

== History ==
Research into the phenomenon of ocean acidification, as well as awareness raising about the problem, has been going on for several decades. The fundamental research really began with the creation of the pH scale by Danish chemist Søren Peder Lauritz Sørensen in 1909. By around the 1950s the massive role of the ocean in absorbing fossil fuel CO_{2} was known to specialists, but not appreciated by the greater scientific community. Throughout much of the 20th century, the dominant focus has been the beneficial process of oceanic CO_{2} uptake, which has enormously ameliorated climate change. The concept of "too much of a good thing" has been late in developing and was triggered only by some key events, and the oceanic sink for heat and CO_{2} is still critical as the primary buffer against climate change.

In the early 1970s questions over the long-term impact of the accumulation of fossil fuel CO_{2} in the sea were already arising around the world and causing strong debate. Researchers commented on the accumulation of fossil CO_{2} in the atmosphere and sea and drew attention to the possible impacts on marine life. By the mid-1990s, the likely impact of CO_{2} levels rising so high with the inevitable changes in pH and carbonate ion became a concern of scientists studying the fate of coral reefs.

By the end of the 20th century the trade-offs between the beneficial role of the ocean in absorbing some 90% of all heat created, and the accumulation of some 50% of all fossil fuel CO_{2} emitted, and the impacts on marine life were becoming more clear. By 2003, the time of planning for the "First Symposium on the Ocean in a High-CO_{2} World" meeting to be held in Paris in 2004, many new research results on ocean acidification were published.

In 2009, members of the InterAcademy Panel called on world leaders to "Recognize that reducing the build up of CO_{2} in the atmosphere is the only practicable solution to mitigating ocean acidification". The statement also stressed the importance to "Reinvigorate action to reduce stressors, such as overfishing and pollution, on marine ecosystems to increase resilience to ocean acidification".

For example, research in 2010 found that in the 15-year period 1995–2010 alone, acidity had increased 6 percent in the upper 100 meters of the Pacific Ocean from Hawaii to Alaska.

According to a statement in July 2012 by Jane Lubchenco, head of the U.S. National Oceanic and Atmospheric Administration "surface waters are changing much more rapidly than initial calculations have suggested. It's yet another reason to be very seriously concerned about the amount of carbon dioxide that is in the atmosphere now and the additional amount we continue to put out."

A 2013 study found acidity was increasing at a rate 10 times faster than in any of the evolutionary crises in Earth's history.

The "Third Symposium on the Ocean in a High-CO_{2} World" took place in Monterey, California, in 2012. The summary for policy makers from the conference stated that "Ocean acidification research is growing rapidly".

In a synthesis report published in Science in 2015, 22 leading marine scientists stated that CO_{2} from burning fossil fuels is changing the oceans' chemistry more rapidly than at any time since the Great Dying (Earth's most severe known extinction event). Their report emphasized that the 2 °C maximum temperature increase agreed upon by governments reflects too small a cut in emissions to prevent "dramatic impacts" on the world's oceans.

A study done in 2020 argues that ocean acidification is not only negatively affecting marine life, but also human health. Food quality, respiratory issues, and human health are all negatively affected by ocean acidification.

== See also ==
- Estuarine acidification – Reducing pH values in coastal marine ecosystems
- Ocean acidification in the Arctic Ocean – Aspect of climate change
- Ocean acidification in the Great Barrier Reef – Threat to the reef which harms corals
- Ocean deoxygenation – Reduction of the oxygen content of the oceans
- Marine pollution – Harmful effects to oceans caused by discarded substances or emitted energy
