= Ocean acidification in the Arctic Ocean =

Aspect of climate change

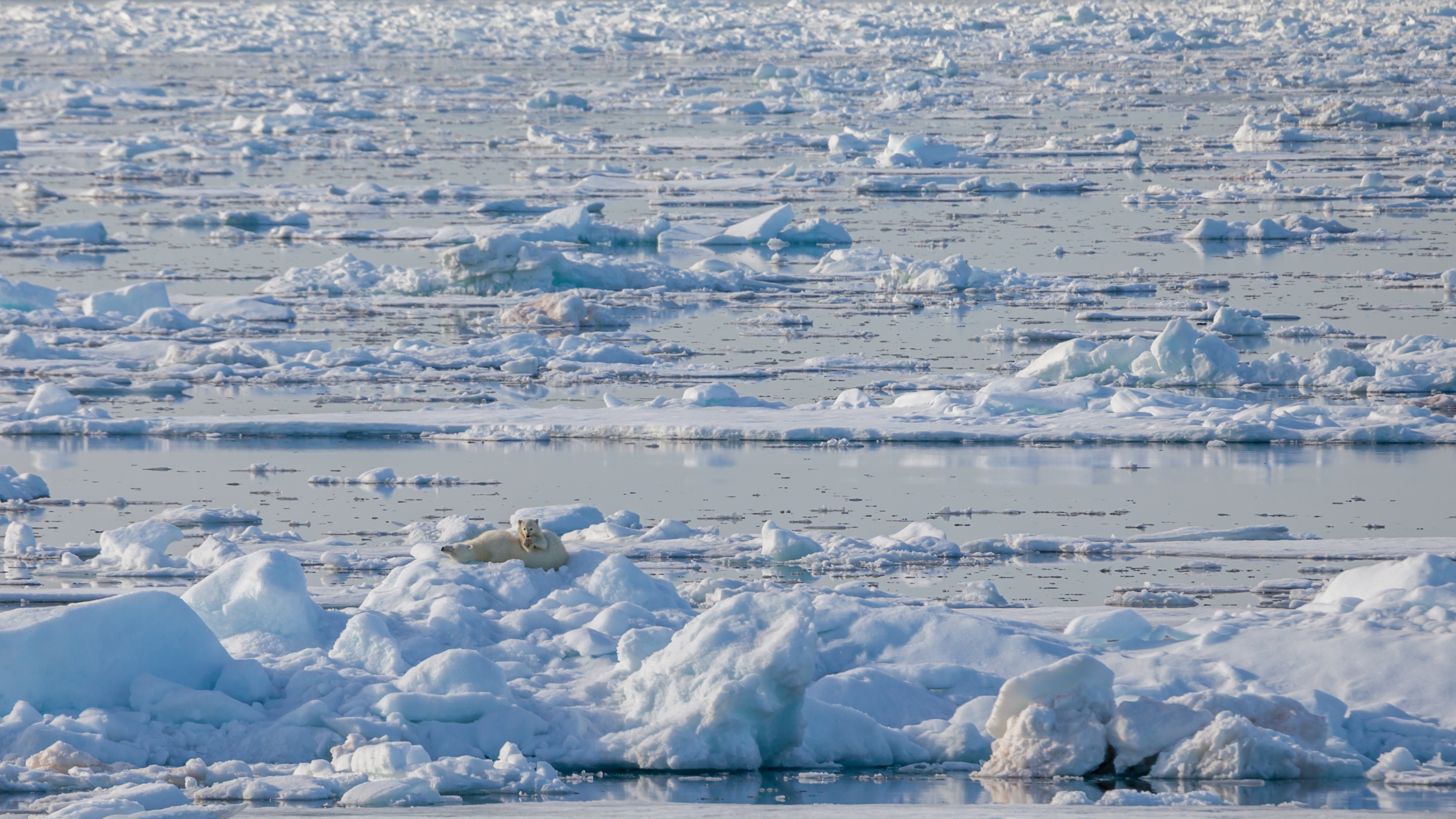
Arctic drift ice, with a popular arctic organism, the polar bear

The Arctic Ocean covers an area of 14,056,000 square kilometers, and supports a diverse and important socioeconomic food web of organisms, despite its average water temperature being 32 degrees Fahrenheit. Over the last three decades, the Arctic Ocean has experienced drastic changes due to climate change. One of the changes is in the acidity levels of the ocean, which have been consistently increasing at twice the rate of the Pacific and Atlantic oceans. Arctic Ocean acidification is a result of feedback from climate system mechanisms, and is having negative impacts on Arctic Ocean ecosystems and the organisms that live within them.

== Process ==
Ocean acidification is caused by the equilibration of the atmosphere with the ocean, a process that occurs worldwide. Carbon dioxide in the atmosphere equilibrates and dissolves into the ocean. During this reaction, carbon dioxide reacts with water to form carbonic acid. The carbonic acid then dissociates into bicarbonate ions and hydrogen ions. This reaction causes the pH of the water to lower, effectively acidifying it. Ocean acidification is occurring in every ocean across the world. Since the beginning of the Industrial Revolution, the World's oceans have absorbed approximately 525 billion tons of carbon dioxide. During this time, world ocean pH has collectively decreased from 8.2 to 8.1, with climatic modeling predicting a further decrease of pH by 0.3 units by 2100. However, the Arctic Ocean has been affected more due to the cold water temperatures and increased solubility of gases as water temperature decreases. The cold Arctic water is able to absorb higher amounts of carbon dioxide compared to the warmer Pacific and Atlantic Oceans.

The chemical changes caused by the acidification of the Arctic Ocean are having negative ecological and socioeconomic repercussions. With the changes in the chemistry of their environment, arctic organisms are challenged with new stressors. These stressors can have damaging effects on these organisms, with some being affected more than others. Calcifying organisms specifically appear to be the most impacted by this changing water composition, as they rely on carbonate availability to survive. Dissolved carbonate concentrations decrease with increasing carbon dioxide and lowered pH in the water.

Ecological food webs are also altered by the acidification. Acidification lowers the ability of many fish to grow, which not only impacts food webs but humans that rely on these fisheries as well. Economic effects are resulting from shifting food webs that decrease popular fish populations. These fish populations provide jobs to people who work in the fisheries industry. As is apparent, ocean acidification lacks any positive benefits, and as a result has been placed high on a priority list within the United States and other organizations such as the Scientific Committee on Oceanic Research, UNESCO's Intergovernmental Oceanographic Commission, the Ocean Carbon and Biogeochemistry Program, the Integrated Marine Biogeochemistry and Ecosystem Research Project, and the Consortium for Ocean Leadership.

== Causes ==
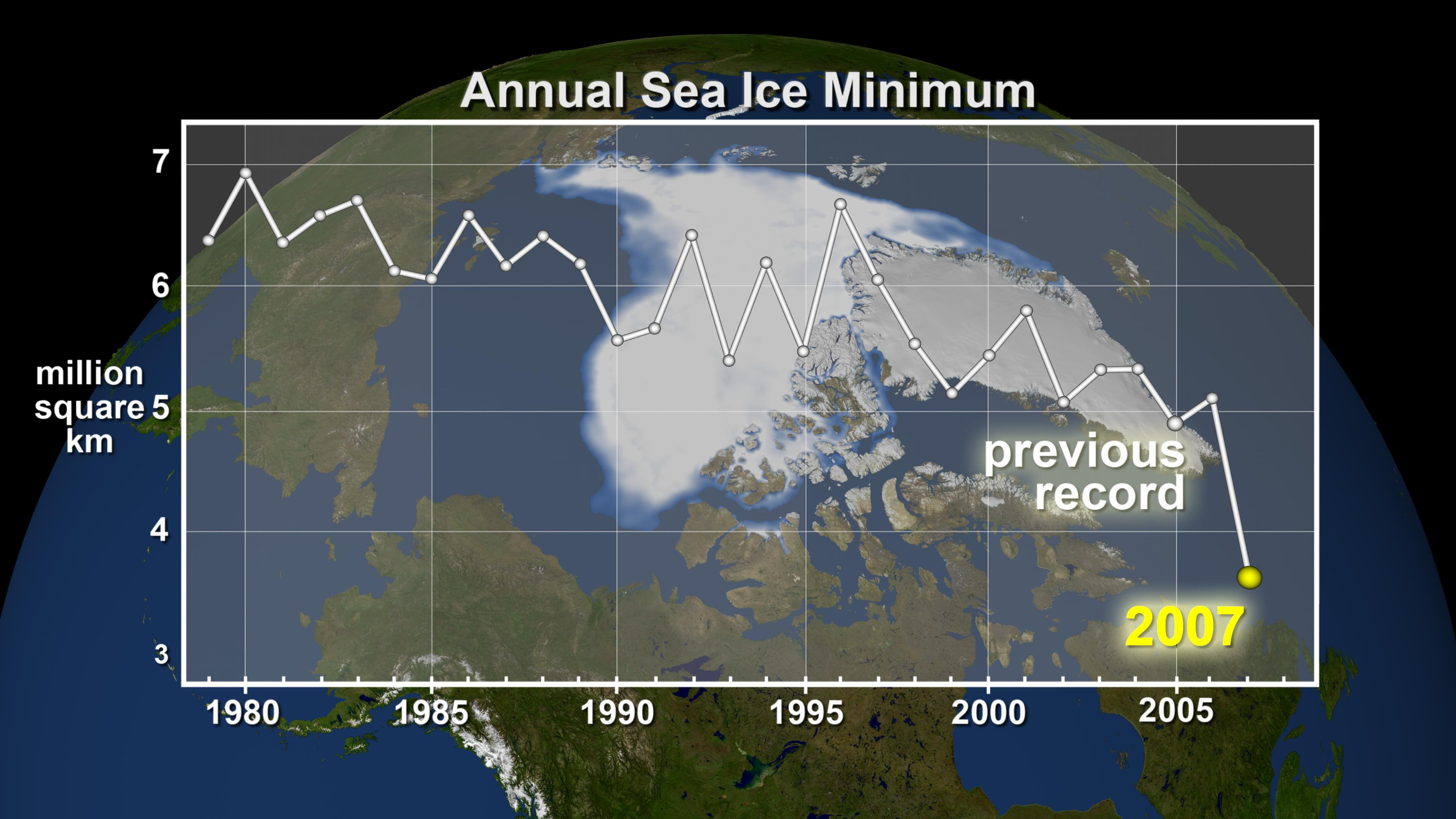
Annual Arctic Sea Ice Minimum

=== Decreased sea ice ===
Arctic sea ice has experienced an extreme reduction over the past few decades, with the minimum area of sea ice being 4.32 million km^{2} in 2019, a sharp 38% decrease from 1980, when the minimum area was 7.01 million km^{2}. Sea ice plays an important role in the health of the Arctic Ocean, and its decline has had detrimental effects on Arctic Ocean chemistry. All oceans equilibrate with the atmosphere by pulling carbon dioxide out of the atmosphere and into the ocean, which lowers the pH of the water. Sea ice limits the air-sea gas exchange with carbon dioxide by protecting the water from being completely exposed to the atmosphere. Low carbon dioxide levels are important to the Arctic Ocean due to intense cooling, fresh water runoff, and photosynthesis from marine organisms.

Reductions in sea ice have allowed more carbon dioxide to equilibrate with the arctic water, resulting in increased acidification. The decrease in sea ice has also allowed more Pacific Ocean water to flow into in the Arctic Ocean during the winter, called Pacific winter water. Pacific Ocean water is high in carbon dioxide, and with decreased amounts of sea ice, more Pacific Ocean water has been able to enter the Arctic Ocean, carrying carbon dioxide with it. This Pacific winter water has further acidified the Arctic Ocean, as well as increased the depth of acidified water.

=== Melting methane hydrates ===
Climate change is causing destabilization of multiple climate systems within the Arctic Ocean. One system that climate change is impacting is methane hydrates. Methane hydrates are located along the continental margins, and are stabilized by high pressure, as well as uniformly low temperatures. Climate change has begun to destabilize these methane hydrates within the Arctic Ocean by decreasing pressure and increasing temperatures, allowing methane hydrates to melt and release methane into the arctic waters. When methane is released into the water, it can either be used via anaerobic metabolism or aerobic metabolism by microorganisms in the ocean sediment, or be released from sea into the atmosphere. Most impactful to ocean acidification is aerobic oxidation by microorganisms in the water column. Carbon dioxide is produced by the reaction of methane and oxygen in water. Carbon dioxide then equilibrates with water, producing carbonic acid, which then equilibrates to release hydrogen ions and bicarbonate and further contributes to ocean acidification.

== Effects on Arctic organisms ==
Organisms in Arctic waters are under high environmental stress such as extremely cold water. It is believed that this high stress environment will cause ocean acidification factors to have a stronger effect on these organisms. It could also cause these effects to appear in the Arctic before it appears in other parts of the ocean. There is a significant variation in the sensitivity of marine organisms to increased ocean acidification. Calcifying organisms generally exhibit larger negative responses from ocean acidification than non-calcifying organisms across numerous response variables, with the exception of crustaceans, which calcify but don't seem to be negatively affected. This is due, mainly, to the process of marine biogenic calcification, that calcifying organisms utilize.

=== Calcifying organisms ===
Carbonate ions (CO_{3}^{2-}) are essential in marine calcifying organisms, like plankton and shellfish, as they are required to produce their calcium carbonate (CaCO_{3}) shells and skeletons. As the ocean acidifies, the increased uptake of CO_{2} by seawater increases the concentration of hydrogen ions, which lowers the pH of the water. This change in the chemical equilibrium of the inorganic carbon system reduces the concentration of these carbonate ions. This reduces the ability of these organisms to create their shells and skeletons.

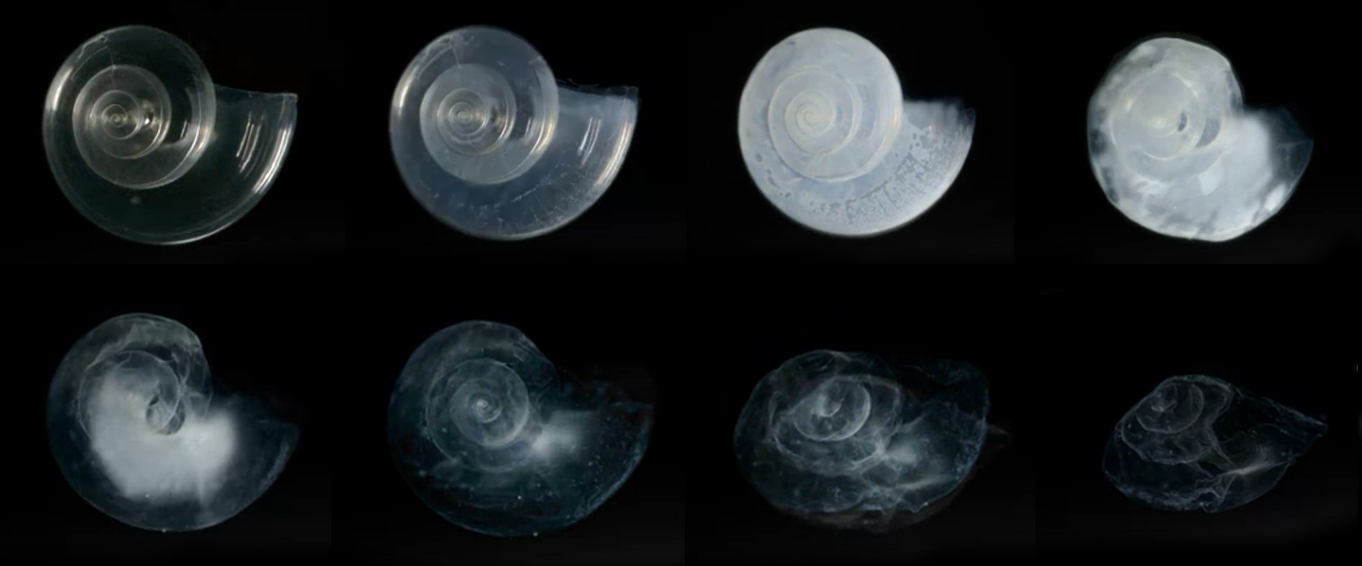
Pterapod shell dissolved in seawater adjusted to an ocean chemistry projected for the year 2100.

The two polymorphs of calcium carbonate that are produced by marine organisms are aragonite and calcite. These are the materials that makes up most of the shells and skeletons of these calcifying organisms. Aragonite, for example, makes up nearly all mollusc shells, as well as the exoskeleton of corals. The formation of these materials is dependent on the saturation state of CaCO_{3} in ocean water. Waters which are saturated in CaCO_{3} are favorable to precipitation and formation of CaCO_{3} shells and skeletons, but waters which are undersaturated are corrosive to CaCO_{3} shells. In the absence of protective mechanisms, dissolution of calcium carbonate will occur. As colder arctic water absorbs more CO_{2}, the concentration of CO_{3}^{2-} is reduced, therefore the saturation of calcium carbonate is lower in high-latitude oceans than it is in tropical or temperate oceans.

The undersaturation of CaCO_{3} causes the shells of calcifying organisms to dissolve, which can have devastating consequences to the ecosystem. As the shells dissolve, the organisms struggle to maintain proper health, which can lead to mass mortality. The loss of many of these species can lead to intense consequences on the marine food web in the Arctic Ocean, as many of these marine calcifying organisms are keystone species. Laboratory experiments on various marine biota in an elevated CO_{2} environment show that changes in aragonite saturation cause substantial changes in overall calcification rates for many species of marine organisms, including coccolithophore, foraminifera, pteropods, mussels, and clams.

Although the undersaturation of arctic water has been proven to have an effect on the ability of organisms to precipitate their shells, recent studies have shown that the calcification rate of calcifiers, such as corals, coccolithophores, foraminiferans and bivalves, decrease with increasing pCO_{2}, even in seawater supersaturated with respect to CaCO_{3}. Additionally, increased pCO_{2} has been found to have complex effects on the physiology, growth and reproductive success of various marine calcifiers.

==== Life cycle ====
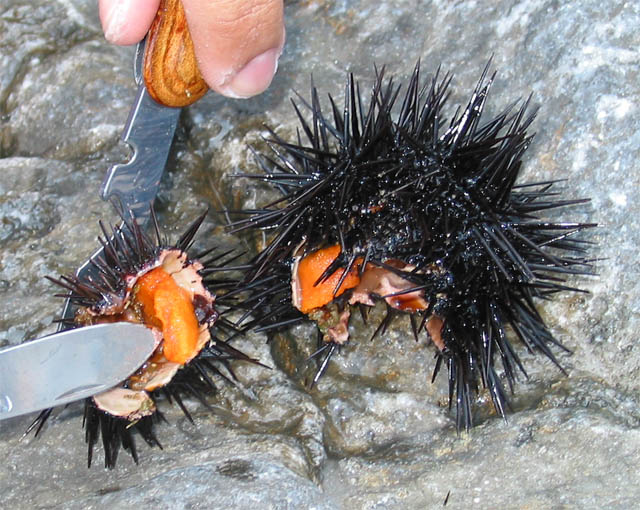
A sea urchin, cracked open to reveal its eggs inside. These eggs hold the embryo stage of this organism.

CO_{2} tolerance seems to differ between various marine organisms, as well as CO_{2} tolerance at different life cycle stages (e.g. larva and adult). The first stage in the life cycle of marine calcifiers at serious risk from high CO_{2} content is the planktonic larval stage. The larval development of several marine species, primarily sea urchins and bivalves, are highly affected by elevations of seawater pCO_{2}. In laboratory tests, numerous sea urchin embryos were reared under different CO_{2} concentrations until they developed to the larval stage. It was found that once they reached this stage, larval and arm sizes were significantly smaller, as well as abnormal skeleton morphology was noted with increasing pCO_{2}.

Similar findings have been found in CO_{2} treated-mussel larvae, which showed a larval size decrease of about 20% and showed morphological abnormalities such as convex hinges, weaker and thinner shells and protrusion of mantle. The larval body size also impacts the encounter and clearance rates of food particles, and if larval shells are smaller or deformed, these larvae are more prone to starvation. CaCO_{3} structures also serve vital functions for calcified larvae, such as defense against predation, as well as roles in feeding, buoyancy control and pH regulation.

Another example of a species which may be seriously impacted by ocean acidification is Pteropods, which are shelled pelagic molluscs which play an important role in the food-web of various ecosystems. Since they harbour an aragonitic shell, they could be very sensitive to ocean acidification driven by the increase of anthropogenic CO_{2} emissions. Laboratory tests showed that calcification exhibits a 28% decrease of the pH value of the Arctic ocean expected for the year 2100, compared to the present pH value. This 28% decline of calcification in the lower pH condition is within the range reported for other calcifying organisms such as corals. In contrast with sea urchin and bivalve larvae, corals and marine shrimps are more severely impacted by ocean acidification after settlement, while they developed into the polyp stage. From laboratory tests, the morphology of the CO_{2}-treated polyp endoskeleton of corals was disturbed and malformed compared to the radial pattern of control polyps.

This variability in the impact of ocean acidification on different life cycle stages of different organisms can be partially explained by the fact that most echinoderms and mollusks start shell and skeleton synthesis at their larval stage, while corals start at the settlement stage. Hence, these stages are highly susceptible to the potential effects of ocean acidification. Most calcifiers, such as corals, echinoderms, bivalves and crustaceans, play important roles in coastal ecosystems as keystone species, bioturbators and ecosystem engineers. The food web in the arctic ocean is somewhat truncated, meaning it is short and simple. Any impacts to key species in the food web can cause exponentially devastating effects on the rest of the food chain as a whole, as they will no longer have a reliable food source. If these larger organisms no longer have any source of nutrients, they too will eventually die off, and the entire Arctic ocean ecosystem will be affected. This would have a huge impact on the arctic people who catch arctic fish for a living, as well as the economic repercussions which would follow such a major shortage of food and living income for these families.

== Effects on local communities ==
Ocean acidification not only has impacts on aquatic life, but also on human communities and the overall livelihood of people living near these waters. For example, as a result of crustaceans being unable to produce their shells and skeletons due to reduced amounts of carbonate ions, populations such as crabs have significantly decreased in some areas in the Northern hemisphere. This has resulted in numerous fisheries in these areas to close down as a result of multi-million dollar losses. In addition, increased temperatures have caused a swift increase in toxic algal blooms, which are known to produce a neurotoxin called domoic acid that can accumulate inside the bodies of certain shellfish. If ingested by humans this toxin can cause severe health issues, which has forced many additional fisheries to close down.

== Methods to reduce acidification ==
Since the carbon cycle is tightly connected to the issue of ocean acidification, the most effective method for minimizing the effects of ocean acidification is to slow climate change. Anthropogenic inputs of CO_{2} can be reduced through methods such as limiting the use of fossil fuels and employing renewable energies. This will ultimately lower the amount of CO_{2} in the atmosphere and reduce the amount dissolved into the oceans. More intrusive methods to mitigate acidification involve a technique called enhanced weathering where powdered minerals like silicate are applied to the land or ocean surface. The powdered minerals enable accelerated dissolution, releasing cations, converting CO_{2} to bicarbonate and increasing the pH of the oceans. Other mitigation methods, like ocean iron fertilization, still need more experimentation and evaluation in order to be deemed effective. Ocean iron fertilization in particular has been shown to increase acidification in the deep ocean while only slightly reducing acidification at the surface.
