= Plankton =

Organisms living in water or air that drift in the current or wind

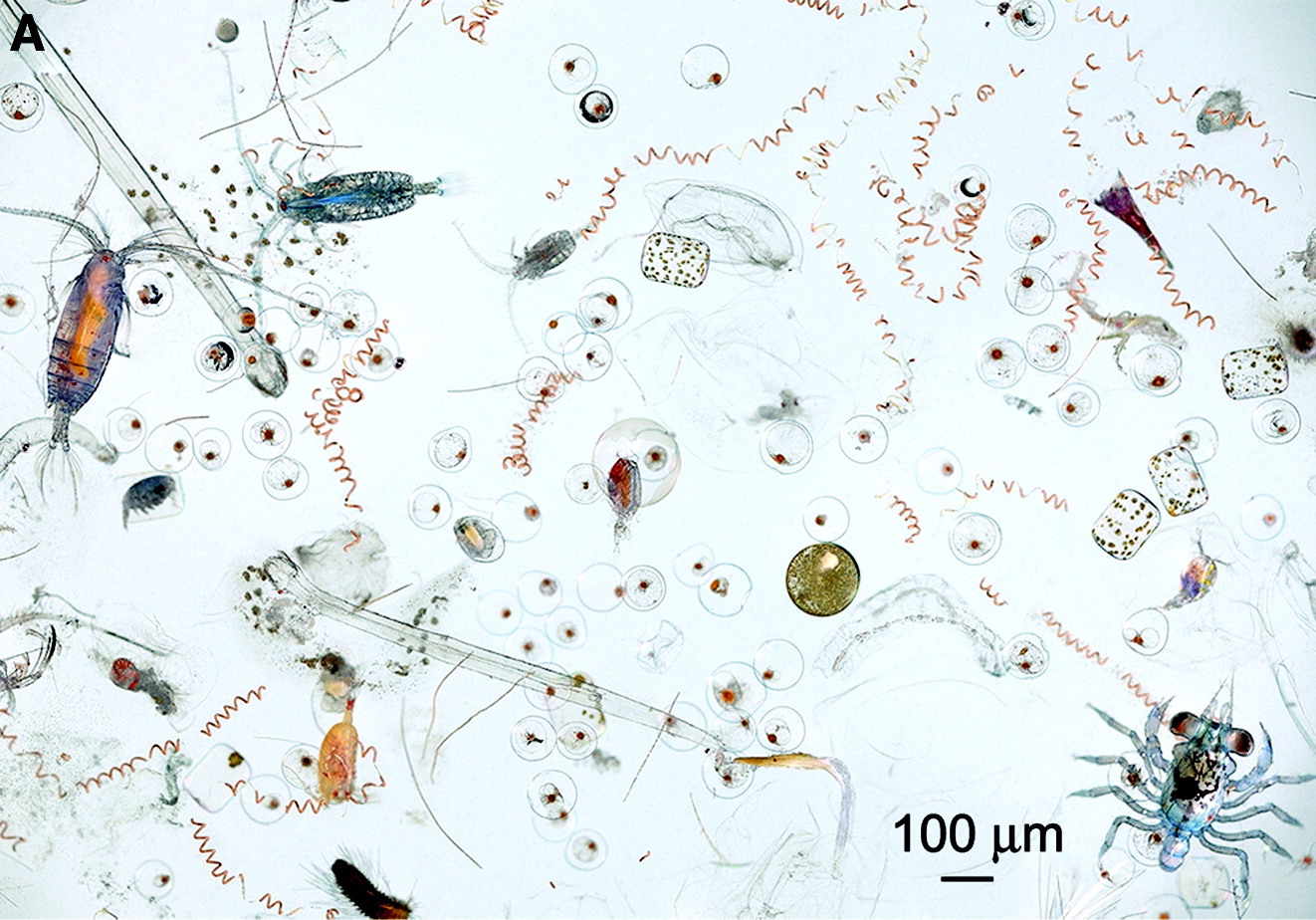
Marine microplankton and mesoplankton Part of the contents of one dip of a hand net. The image contains diverse planktonic organisms, ranging from photosynthetic cyanobacteria and diatoms to many different types of zooplankton, including both holoplankton (permanent residents of the plankton like copepods) and meroplankton (temporary residents of the plankton like fish eggs and crab larvae). 100 μm is one tenth of a mm

Plankton (from the Greek planktos, meaning "drifter" or "wanderer") are organisms that drift in water (or air) but are unable to actively propel themselves against currents (or wind). Marine plankton include drifting organisms that inhabit the saltwater of oceans and the brackish waters of estuaries. Freshwater plankton are similar to marine plankton, but are found in lakes and rivers. An individual plankton organism in the plankton is called a plankter.

Plankton includes organisms from species across all the major biological kingdoms, ranging in size from the microscopic (such as bacteria, archaea, protozoa and microscopic algae and fungi) to larger organisms (such as jellyfish and ctenophores). This is because plankton are defined by their ecological niche and level of motility rather than by any phylogenetic or taxonomic classification. The plankton category differentiates organisms from those that can swim against a current, called nekton, and those that live on the deep sea floor, called benthos. Organisms that float on or near the water's surface are called neuston. Neuston that drift as water currents or wind take them, and lack the swimming ability to counter this, form a special subgroup of plankton. Mostly plankton just drift where currents take them, though some, like jellyfish, swim slowly but not fast enough to generally overcome the influence of currents.

Plankton are a diverse group, which traditionally were divided into two trophic (feeding) groups: phytoplankton and zooplankton. Phytoplankton (autotrophic plant-like producers such as diatoms and cyanobacteria) synthesize their own food, while zooplankton (heterotrophic consumers such as radiolarians and copepods) get their food like animals do, by predating and eating other life forms. In recent years research has shown unicellular plankton often combine photosynthesis and ingestion within their single cell, such as Mesodinium and many dinoflagellates, which means they can act in both the above feeding modes. This has resulted in the recognition of a third group, called the mixoplankton. A fourth group are planktonic decomposers, which include microscopic fungi (mycoplankton and mobile zoospores), bacterioplankton and aquatic viruses. These decomposers recycle organic nutrients so they can be used again as food by other plankton through processes such as the mycoloop, microbial loop and viral shunt.

Microscopic plankton, smaller than about one millimetre in size, play crucial roles maintaining the health and balance of aquatic ecosystems. Phytoplankton (generally microscopic) are responsible for roughly half of Earth's oxygen production through photosynthesis and play a major role in carbon sequestration. Together, these largely unseen microplankton drive primary production, support local food webs and cycle nutrients. Marine microorganisms have been variously estimated to make up between 70 and 90 percent of the ocean biomass. They influence global biogeochemical processes and largely drive the biological pump (which removes carbon dioxide from the atmosphere and exports carbon to deeper waters). Altogether, plankton form the foundation of the marine food web, supporting many commercially important species from forage fish to baleen whales. Although plankton are usually thought of as inhabiting water, there are also airborne versions that live part of their lives drifting in the atmosphere. These aeroplankton can include plant spores, pollen and wind-scattered seeds. They can also include microorganisms swept into the air from terrestrial dust storms and oceanic plankton swept into the air by sea spray.

== Overview ==
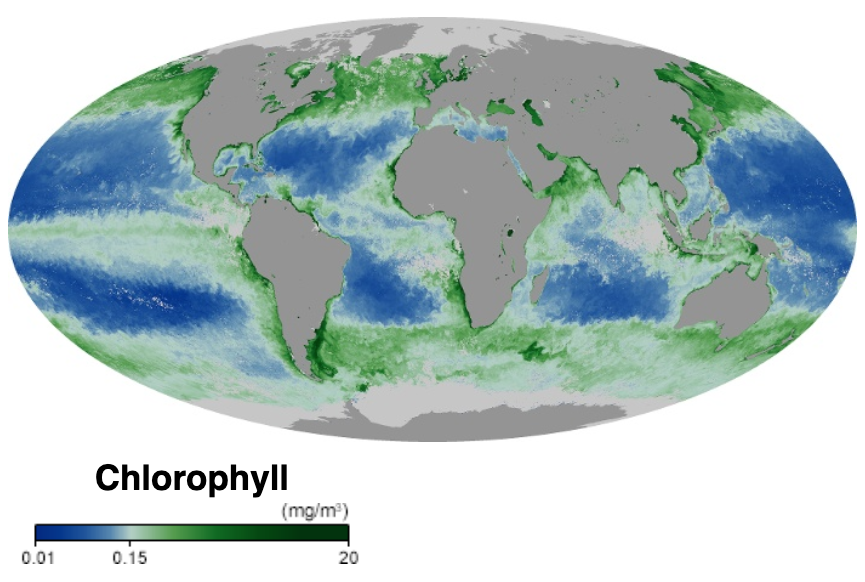
Ocean chlorophyll concentration is a proxy for, or an indicator of, the distribution and abundance of phytoplankton. The intensity of green indicates how abundant the phytoplankton are, while blue indicates where there are few phytoplankton. – NASA Earth Observatory, October 2019.

Apart from aeroplankton, plankton inhabits oceans, seas, estuaries, rivers, lakes and ponds. Local abundance varies horizontally, vertically and seasonally. The primary cause of this variability is the availability of light. Nearly all plankton ecosystems are driven by the input of solar energy (but see chemosynthesis), confining nearly all primary production to surface waters, and to geographical regions and seasons having abundant light.

A secondary variable is nutrient availability. The amount and distribution of plankton depends on available nutrients, the state of water and a large amount of other plankton. The local distribution of plankton can be affected by wind-driven Langmuir circulation and the biological effects of this physical process. Although large areas of the tropical and sub-tropical oceans have abundant light, they experience relatively low primary production because they offer limited nutrients such as nitrate, phosphate and silicate. This results from large-scale ocean circulation and water column stratification. In such regions, primary production usually occurs at greater depth, although at a reduced level (because of reduced light).

While plankton are most abundant in surface waters, they live throughout the water column. At depths where no primary production occurs, zooplankton and bacterioplankton instead consume organic material sinking from more productive surface waters above. This flux of sinking material, so-called marine snow, can be especially high following the termination of spring blooms.

Despite significant macronutrient concentrations, some ocean regions are unproductive (so-called HNLC regions). The micronutrient iron is deficient in these regions, and adding it can lead to the formation of phytoplankton algal blooms. Iron primarily reaches the ocean through the deposition of dust on the sea surface. Paradoxically, oceanic areas adjacent to unproductive, arid land thus typically have abundant phytoplankton (e.g., the eastern Atlantic Ocean, where trade winds bring dust from the Sahara Desert in north Africa).

Within the plankton, holoplankton spend their entire life cycle as plankton (e.g. most algae, copepods, salps, and some jellyfish). By contrast, meroplankton are only planktic for part of their lives (usually the larval stage), and then graduate to either a nektic (swimming) or benthic (sea floor) existence. Examples of meroplankton include the larvae of sea urchins, starfish, crustaceans, marine worms, and most fish.

=== Microscopic plankton ===
Microplankton

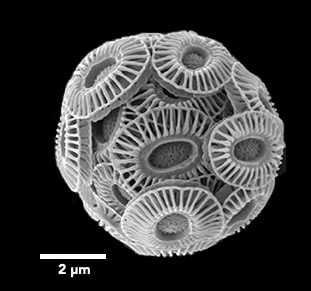
The coccolithophore Emiliania huxleyi (μm = thousandth of one mm)

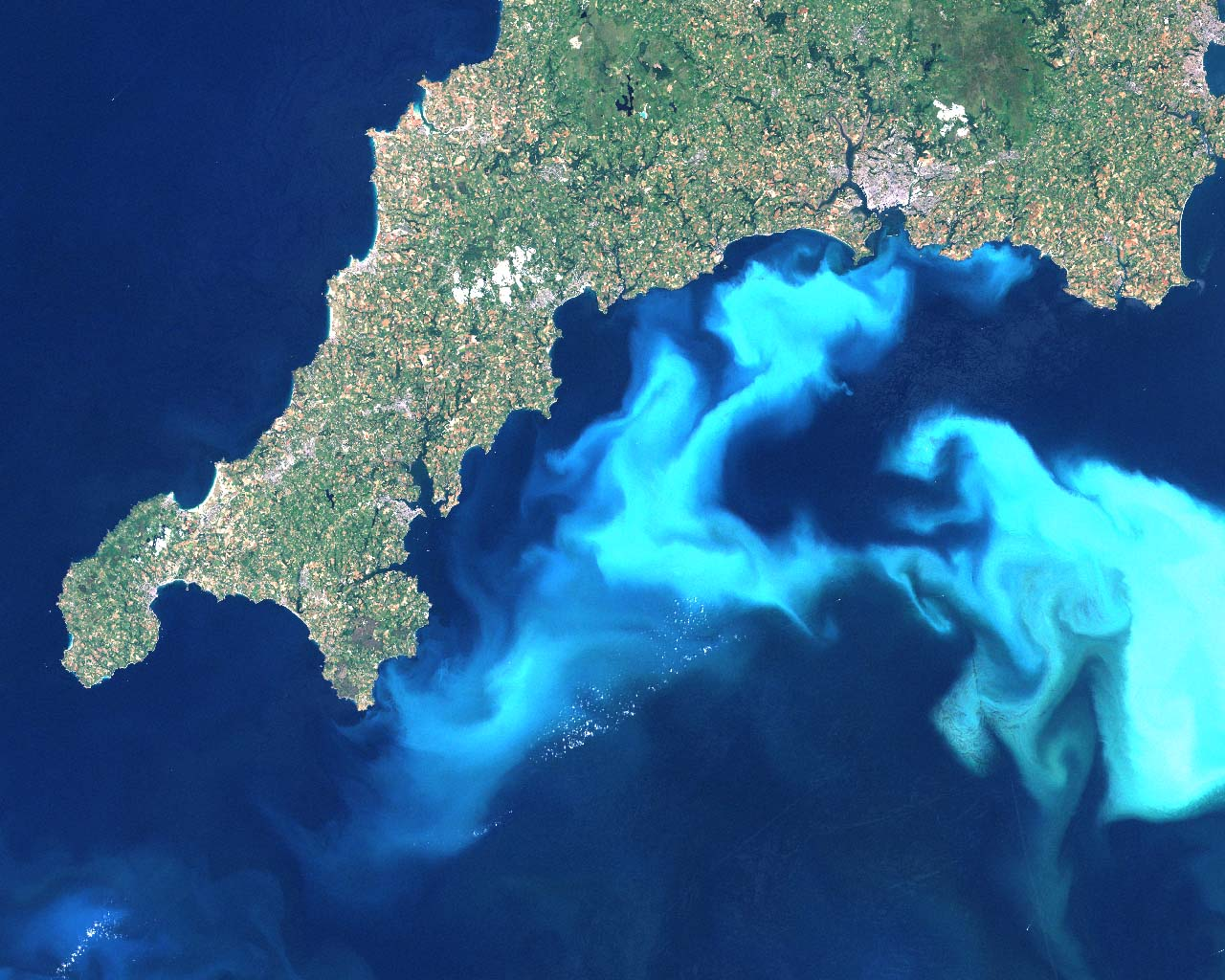
Algae bloom of Emiliania huxleyi off the southern coast of England

Plankton is mostly made up of planktonic microorganisms less than one millimetre across, most visible only through a microscope. Microorganisms have been variously estimated to make up about 70%, or about 90%, of the total ocean biomass. Taken together they form the marine microbiome. Over billions of years this microbiome has evolved many life styles and adaptations and come to participate in the global cycling of almost all chemical elements.

Microplankton are ecological linchpins in the marine food web. They are crucial to nutrient recycling in the way they act as decomposers. They are also responsible for nearly all photosynthesis that occurs in the ocean, as well as the cycling of carbon, nitrogen, phosphorus and other nutrients and trace elements. Microplankton sequesters large amounts of carbon and produce much of the world's oxygen.

It is estimated marine viruses kill 20% of ocean microplankton biomass every day. Viruses are the main agents responsible for the rapid destruction of harmful algal blooms which often kill other marine life. The number of viruses in the plankton decreases further offshore and deeper into the water, where there are fewer host organisms.

=== Terminology ===
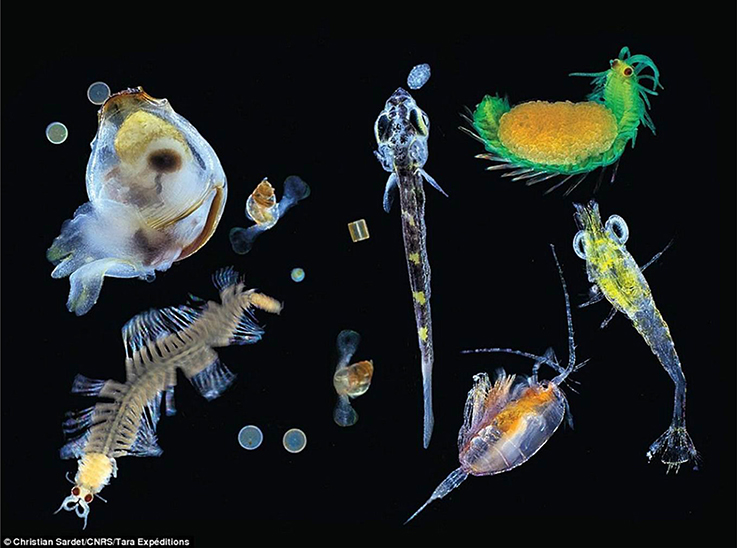
Plankton species diversity Diverse assemblages of unicellular and multicellular organisms with different sizes, shapes, feeding strategies, ecological functions, life cycle characteristics, and environmental sensitivities. Courtesy of Christian Sardet/CNRS/Tara expeditions

The name plankton was coined by German marine biologist Victor Hensen in 1887 from shortening the word halyplankton from Greek ἅλς háls "sea" and πλανάομαι planáomai "(I) drift" or "(I) wander". Some forms of plankton are capable of independent vertically movement, and can swim hundreds of meters vertically in a single day (a behavior called diel vertical migration). However their horizontal position is primarily determined by the surrounding water movement, so plankton typically flow with the ocean currents. This is in contrast to nekton organisms, such as fish, squid and marine mammals, which can swim against the ambient flow and control their position in the environment.

The study of plankton is termed planktology and a planktonic individual is referred to as a plankter. The adjective planktonic is widely used in both the scientific and popular literature, and is a generally accepted term. However, from the standpoint of prescriptive grammar, the less-commonly used planktic is more strictly the correct adjective. When deriving English words from their Greek or Latin roots, the gender-specific ending (in this case, "-on" which indicates the word is neuter) is normally dropped, using only the root of the word in the derivation.

== By habitat ==
=== Aeroplankton ===
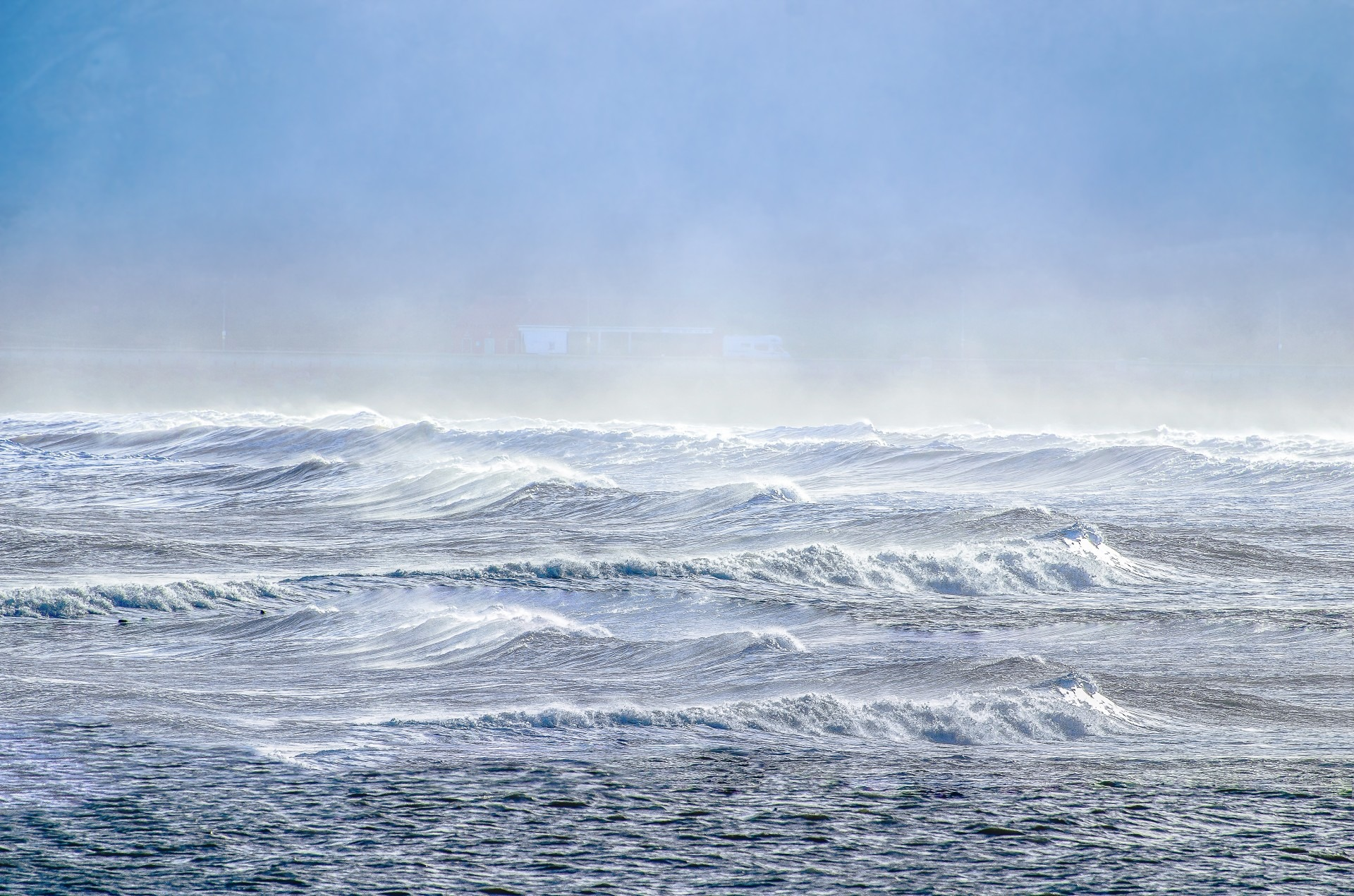
Sea spray containing microorganisms in marine plankton can be swept high into the atmosphere and may travel the globe as aeroplankton before falling back to earth.

Aeroplankton are tiny lifeforms that float and drift in the air, carried by the current of the wind; they are the atmospheric analogue to oceanic plankton. Most of the living things that make up aeroplankton are very small to microscopic in size, and many can be difficult to identify because of their tiny size. Scientists can collect them for study in traps and sweep nets from aircraft, kites or balloons. Aeroplankton is made up of numerous microbes, including viruses, about 1000 different species of bacteria, around 40,000 varieties of fungi, and hundreds of species of protists, algae, mosses and liverworts that live some part of their life cycle as aeroplankton, often as spores, pollen, and wind-scattered seeds. Additionally, peripatetic microorganisms are swept into the air from terrestrial dust storms, and an even larger amount of airborne marine microorganisms are propelled high into the atmosphere in sea spray. Aeroplankton deposits hundreds of millions of airborne viruses and tens of millions of bacteria every day on every square meter around the planet. This means similar mixes of microscopic plankton taxon can be found in open bodies of water around the world.

The sea surface microlayer, compared to the sub-surface waters, contains elevated concentration of bacteria and viruses. These materials can be transferred from the sea-surface to the atmosphere in the form of wind-generated aqueous aerosols due to their high vapour tension and a process known as volatilisation. When airborne, these microbes can be transported long distances to coastal regions. If they hit land they can have an effect on animal, vegetation and human health. Marine aerosols that contain viruses can travel hundreds of kilometers from their source and remain in liquid form as long as the humidity is high enough (over 70%). These aerosols are able to remain suspended in the atmosphere for about 31 days. Evidence suggests that bacteria can remain viable after being transported inland through aerosols. Some reached as far as 200 meters at 30 meters above sea level. The process which transfers this material to the atmosphere causes further enrichment in both bacteria and viruses in comparison to either the SML or sub-surface waters (up to three orders of magnitude in some locations).

=== Freshwater plankton ===
Freshwater plankton parallel marine plankton (below), but are found inland in the freshwaters of lakes and rivers.

=== Geoplankton ===
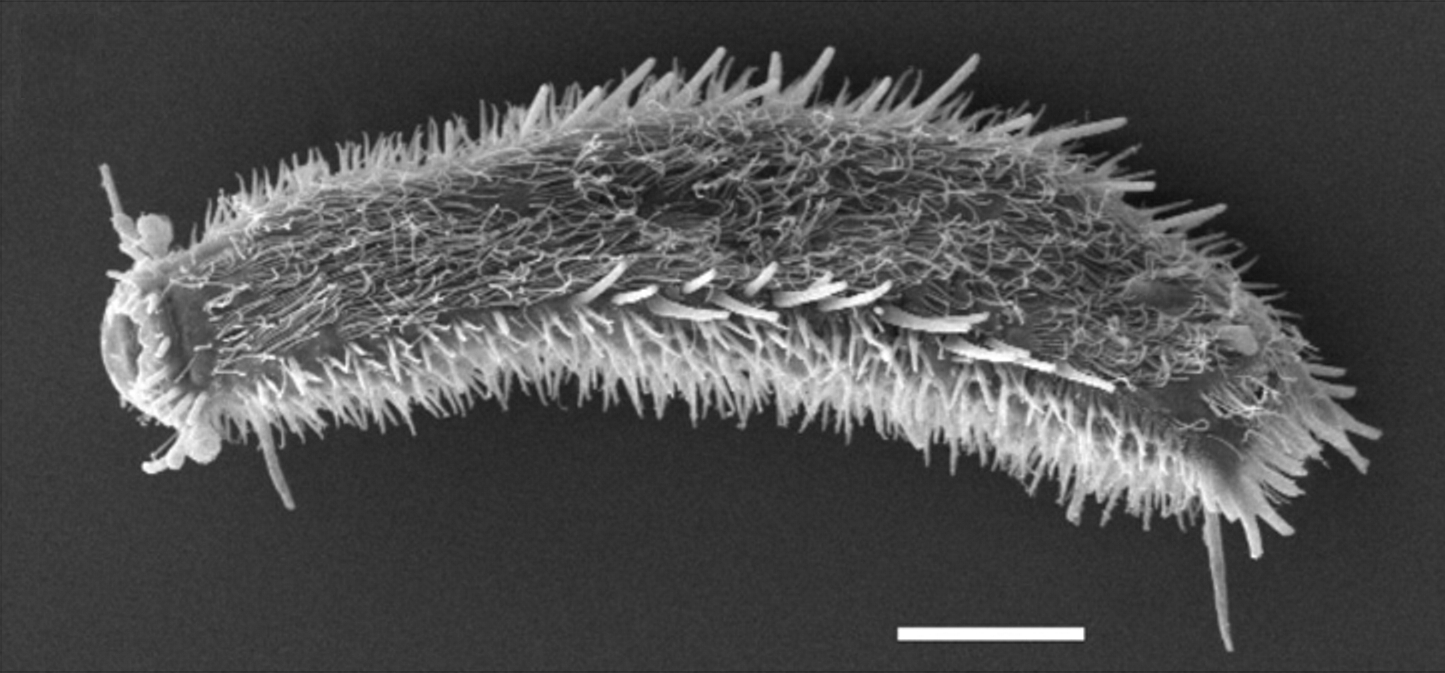
A gastrotrich can lay resilient eggs capable of surviving years in a dry environment. Scale bar: 20 μm.

Many animals live in terrestrial environments by thriving in transient often microscopic bodies of water and moisture, these include rotifers and gastrotrichs which lay resilient eggs capable of surviving years in dry environments, and some of which can go dormant themselves. Nematodes are usually microscopic with this lifestyle. Water bears, despite only having lifespans of a few months, famously can enter suspended animation during dry or hostile conditions and survive for decades. This allows them to be ubiquitous in terrestrial environments despite needing water to grow and reproduce. Many microscopic crustacean groups like copepods and amphipods (of which sandhoppers are members) and seed shrimp are known to go dormant when dry and live in transient bodies of water too

=== Marine plankton ===
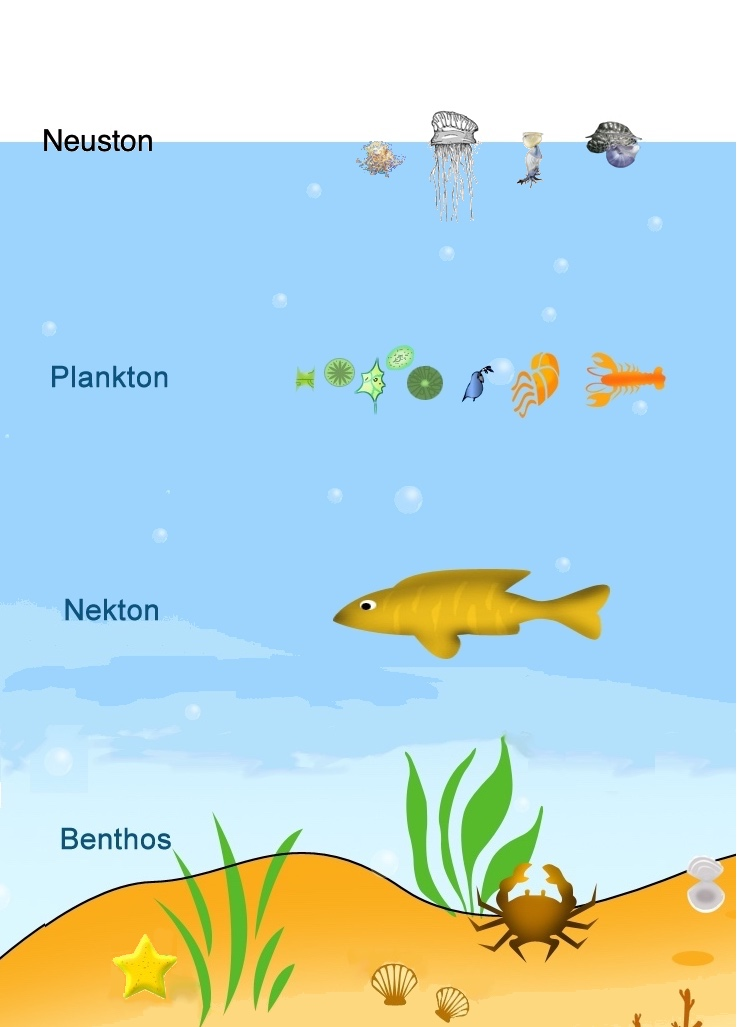
Plankton (organisms that drift with water currents) can be contrasted with nekton (organisms that can swim against water currents) and benthos (organisms that live at the ocean floor). There are also neuston (organisms that live at the ocean surface). Neuston that cannot swim against currents or the wind are a special subset of plankton.

Marine plankton includes marine protists (algae and protozoa), drifting and floating animals (particularly microanimals), marine prokaryotes (bacteria and archaea), and marine viruses that inhabit the saltwater of oceans and the brackish waters of estuaries.

==== At the ocean surface ====
Plankton are also found at the ocean surface. Organisms that live at or just below the air-sea interface are called neuston. They float either on the water's surface (epineuston) or swim in the top few centimeters (hyponeuston). Many neuston qualify to be categorised as part of the broader plankton community, because they drift largely as currents or wind dictate, lacking strong enough swimming ability to counter them.

Neustonic animals are primarily adapted to float upside-down on the ocean surface, similar to an inverted benthos, and form a unique subset of the zooplankton community, which plays a pivotal role in the functioning of marine ecosystems. Neustonic zooplankton are partially responsible for the active energy flux between superficial and deep layers of the ocean.Neustonic plankton is also a food source for marine zooplankton and fish migrating from the deep layers and seabirds.

==== In deep ocean ====
In 2025, researchers discovered microbial communities inhabiting the ocean conveyor belt, even at great depths in the ocean. Ocean currents are generated by surface wind and storms down to about 500 m (1,600 ft) below the surface. But the average depth of the ocean goes far below to 3.7 km (2.3 mi). At these greater depths, currents are driven by differences in water density, which in turn are controlled by differences in water temperature and salinity. This mechanism results in a circulation which behaves like a conveyor belt, carrying water and microorganisms to great depths and around the world.

Water samples were taken along the full depth of the water column in the South Pacific Ocean, from Easter Island to Antarctica. They found marked increases in microbial diversity about 300 m (1,000 ft) deep, in a layer they call the prokaryotic phylocline. This zone, similar to the pycnocline, represents a shift from less diverse surface waters to abundant microbial ecosystems in the deep ocean. For instance, a group they called the Antarctic Bottom Water contains microbes suited to cold and high pressure, while another group they called the Ancient Water Group, located in slowly circulating water isolated from the surface for over a millennium, contains microbes with genes adapted to low oxygen.

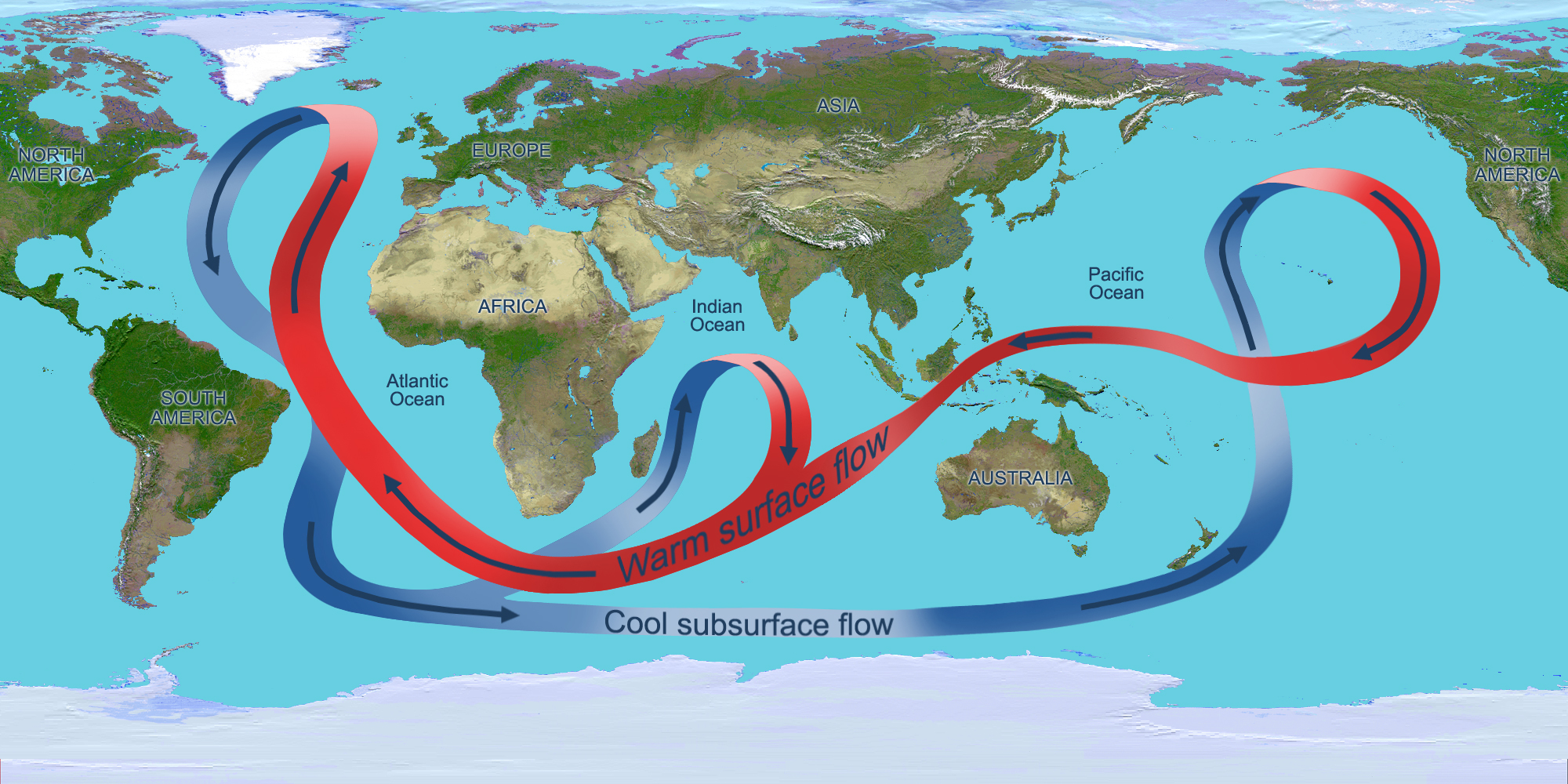
The ocean conveyor belt carries warm surface waters (red) northward near the surface and cold deep waters (blue) southward. Diverse and flourishing microbial ecosystems have been found deep in the belt.

== By taxon ==
Plankton contains representatives from all major divisions of life. This is because plankton are defined by habitat (water/air) and behaviour (drifting), and not by any phylogenetic or taxonomic considerations. So plankton are not a taxon, but they can be divided into broad taxonomic groups, as follows:

- planktonic animals (metazoa) : – mostly predators (zooplankton) of smaller plankton. Examples are arrow worms, sea butterfly, ostracods, and salps. There are also planktonic microanimals typically smaller than one mm, such as copepods, water fleas, rotifers, and larval stages of various crustaceans and corals.
- planktonic protists: – single-celled eukaryote microorganisms, mostly invisible to the naked eye, such as diatoms, dinoflagellates, coccolithophores, foraminifera, radiolarians, and ciliates. Planktonic protists include algae (phytoplankton), protozoa (zooplankton), and many mixoplankton.
- planktonic fungi: – known also as mycoplankton, play important roles in remineralisation and nutrient cycling. For example, in the mycoloop, parasitic chytrids facilitate the transfer of nutrients from large, inedible phytoplankton to zooplankton.
- planktonic prokaryotes: planktonic bacteria and archaea known also as bacterioplankton and archaeoplankton. These play important roles as primary producers, or in remineralising organic material like mycoplankton down the water column. Photosynthetic cyanobacteria are important members of the phytoplankton. The unusually small Pelagibacter ubique, perhaps the most abundant bacterium on Earth, makes up about one third of microbial cells in the surface ocean, and plays important roles recycling nutrients in the microbial loop. The Roseobacter clade are significantly connected to phytoplankton.
- planktonic viruses: – known also as virioplankton, though not always classified as living organisms, are abundant in planktonic communities and influence microbial dynamics. Viruses are small infectious agents that can replicate only inside the living cells of a host organism, because they need the replication machinery of the host to do so. They are more abundant in the plankton than bacteria and archaea, though much smaller. Viruses can infect all types of life forms, from animals and plants to microorganisms, including bacteria and archaea. In the viral shunt, viruses infect and break down (lyse) bacteria, releasing their nutrients and organic matter back into the water instead of allowing them to be consumed by larger organisms like zooplankton. This "shunts" nutrients away from higher trophic levels, keeping them in the microbial loop for reuse by other microorganisms.
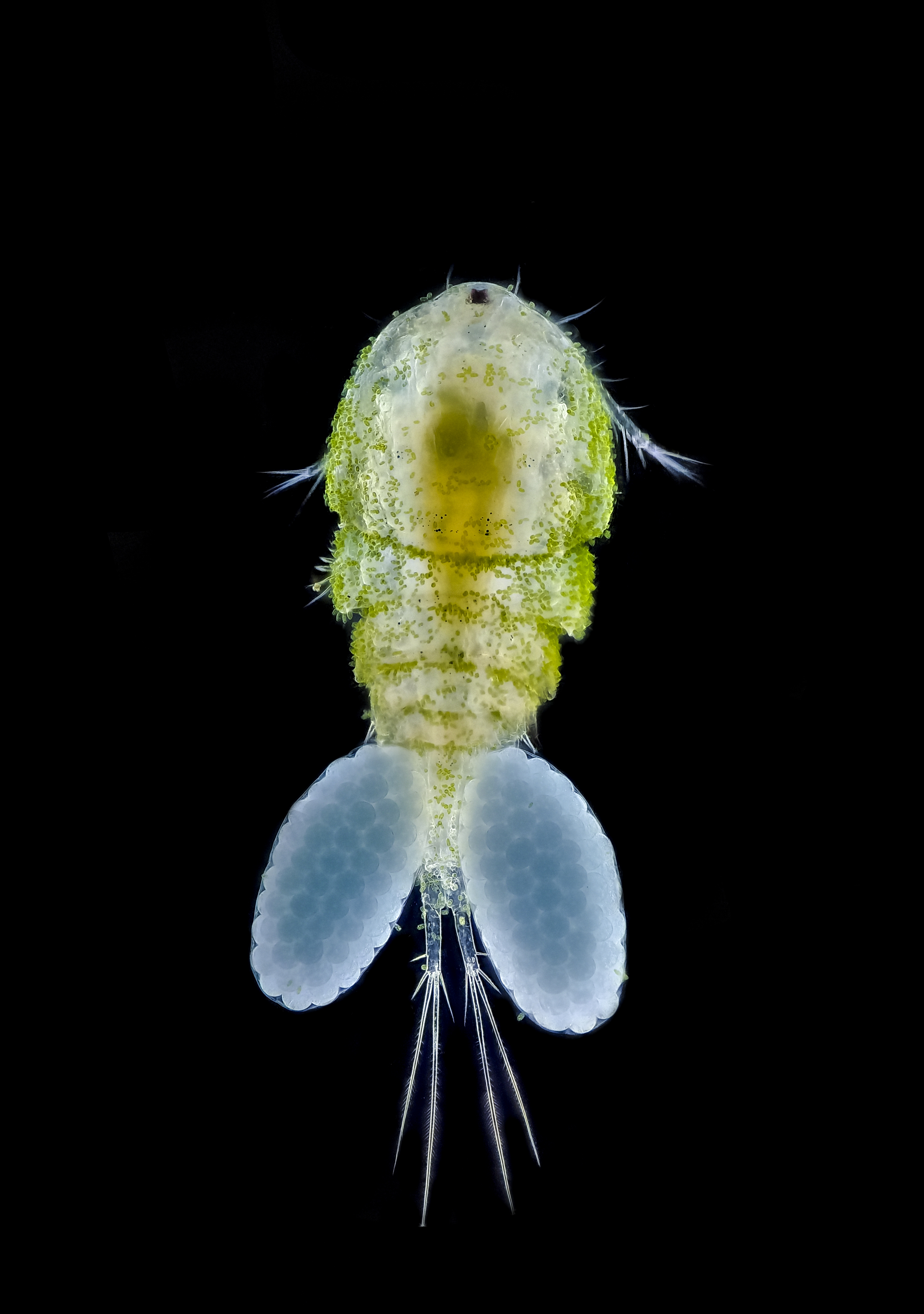
This planktonic animal (metazoa) is a female copepod. It has two egg sacs and microalgae attached to its body

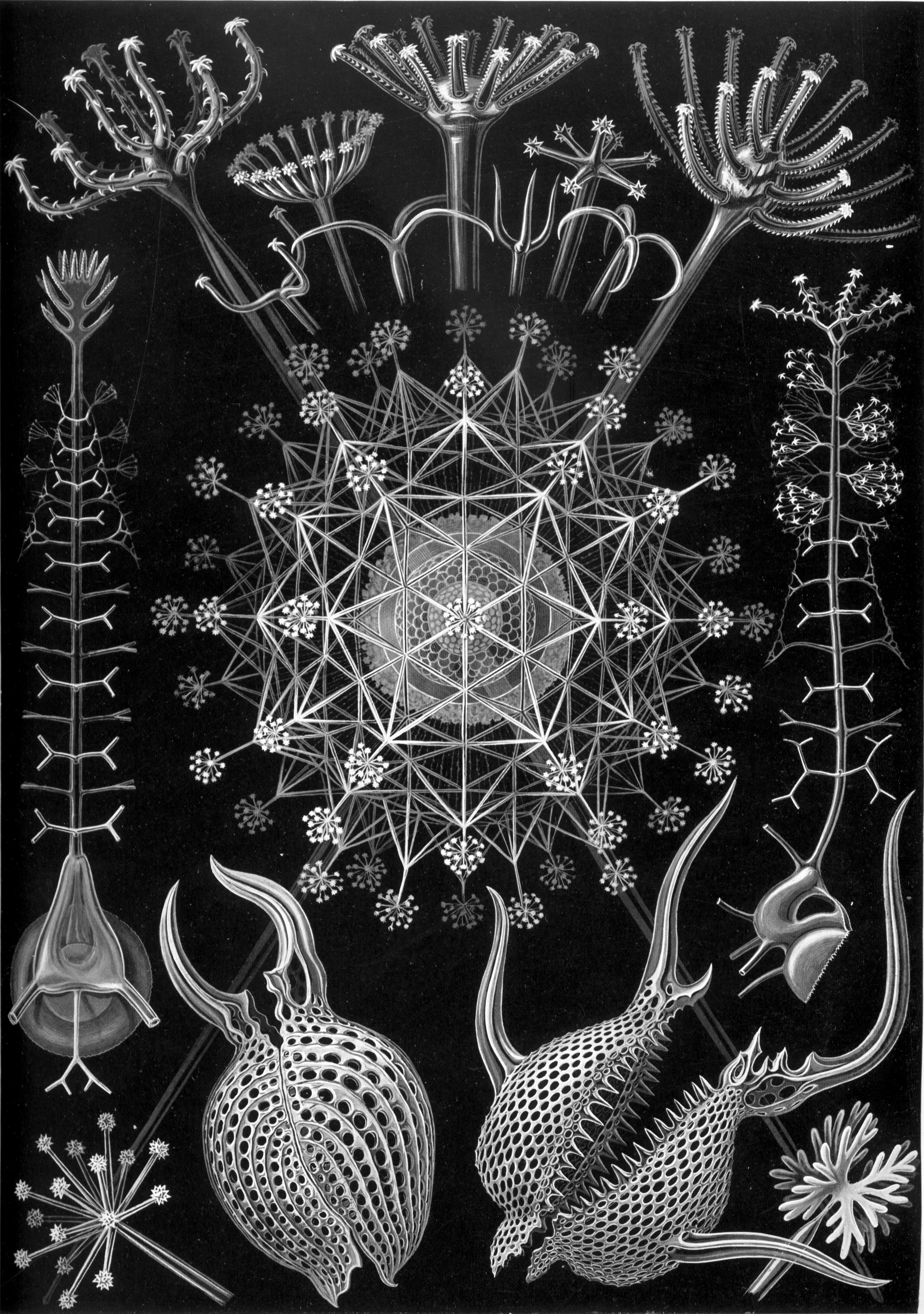
These are shells of planktonic protists called radiolarians, drawn by Ernst Haeckel (1904)

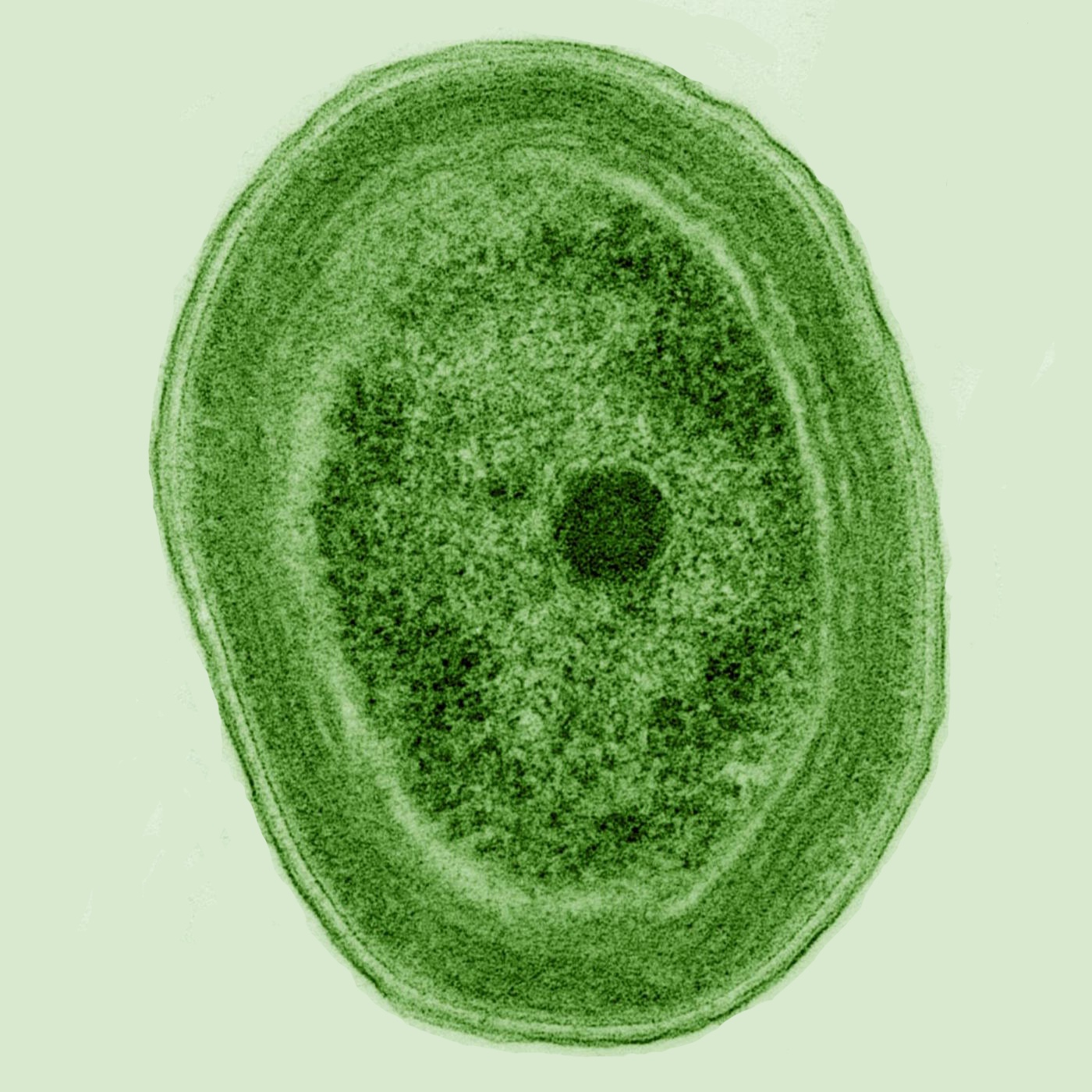
This planktonic bacterium is the cyanobacterium Prochlorococcus, the smallest photosynthetic organism in the world. It contributes up to 20% of the world's oxygen production, more than all tropical rainforests.

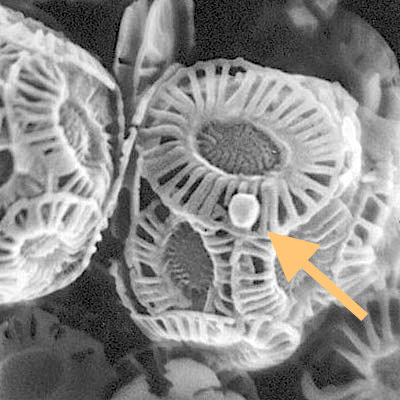
This planktonic virus (arrowed) is the giant coccolithovirus, Emiliania huxleyi virus 86, infecting an Emiliania huxleyi coccolithophore
Plankton sizes by taxonomic groups
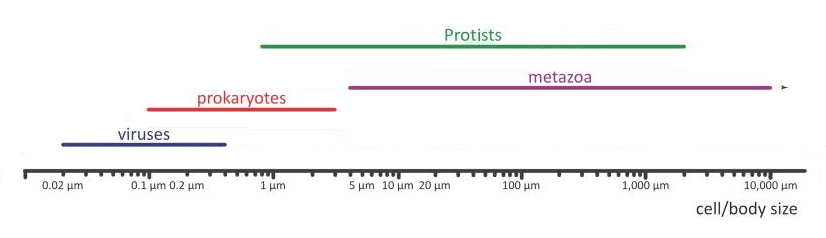

== By size ==
Plankton are also often described in terms of size. Usually the following divisions are used:

Group	Size range (ESD)	Examples
Megaplankton	> 20 cm	metazoans; e.g. jellyfish; ctenophores; salps and pyrosomes (pelagic Tunicata); Cephalopoda; Amphipoda
Macroplankton	2→20 cm	metazoans; e.g. Pteropoda; Chaetognaths; Medusae; ctenophores; salps, doliolids and pyrosomes (pelagic Tunicata); Cephalopoda; Janthina and Recluzia (two genera of gastropods); Amphipoda
Mesoplankton	0.2→20 mm	metazoans; e.g. copepods; Medusae; Cladocera; Ostracoda; Chaetognaths; Pteropoda; Tunicata
Microplankton	20→200 μm	large eukaryotic protists; most phytoplankton; Protozoa Foraminifera; tintinnids; other ciliates; Rotifera; juvenile metazoans – Crustacea (copepod nauplii)
Nannoplankton	2→20 μm	small eukaryotic protists; small diatoms; small flagellates; Pyrrophyta; Chrysophyta; Chlorophyta; Xanthophyta
Picoplankton	0.2→2 μm	small eukaryotic protists; bacteria; Chrysophyta
Femtoplankton	< 0.2 μm	marine viruses

However, some of these terms may be used with very different boundaries, especially on the larger end. The term microplankton is sometimes used more broadly to cover plankton that cannot really be seen without using a microscope, say plankton less than about one millimetre across. The existence and importance of nano- and even smaller plankton was only discovered during the 1980s, but they are thought to make up the largest proportion of all plankton in number and diversity. It is the largely unseen microplankton that are the main drivers of the marine food web.

Microplankton and smaller groups are microorganisms that operate at low Reynolds numbers, where the viscosity of water is more important than its mass or inertia.

Microplankton

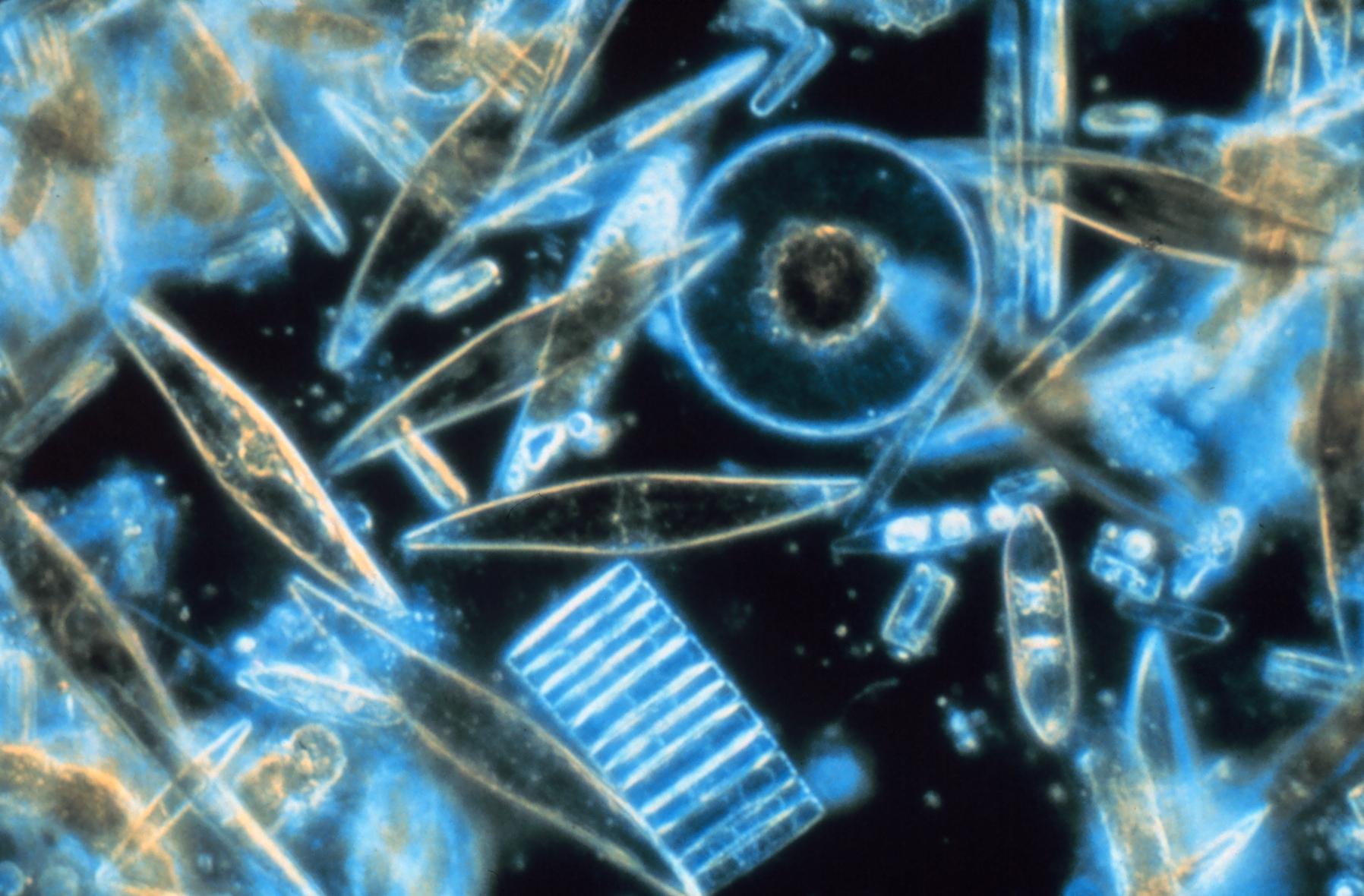
Some marine diatoms — a key phytoplankton group

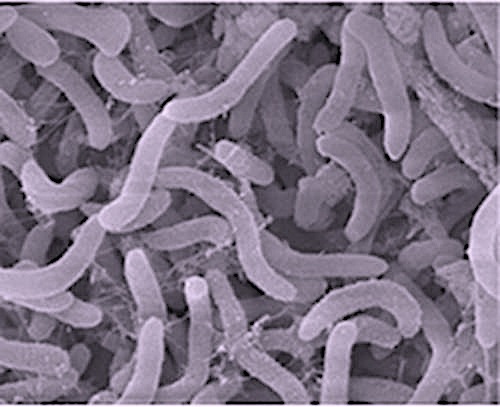
Pelagibacter ubique, the most common bacteria in the ocean, plays a major role in global carbon cycles

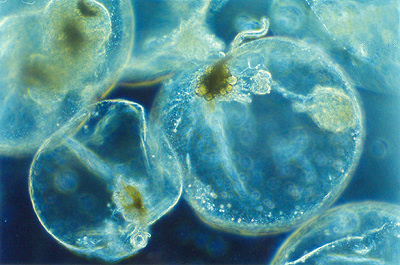
The sea sparkle dinoflagellate glows in the night to produce the milky seas effect

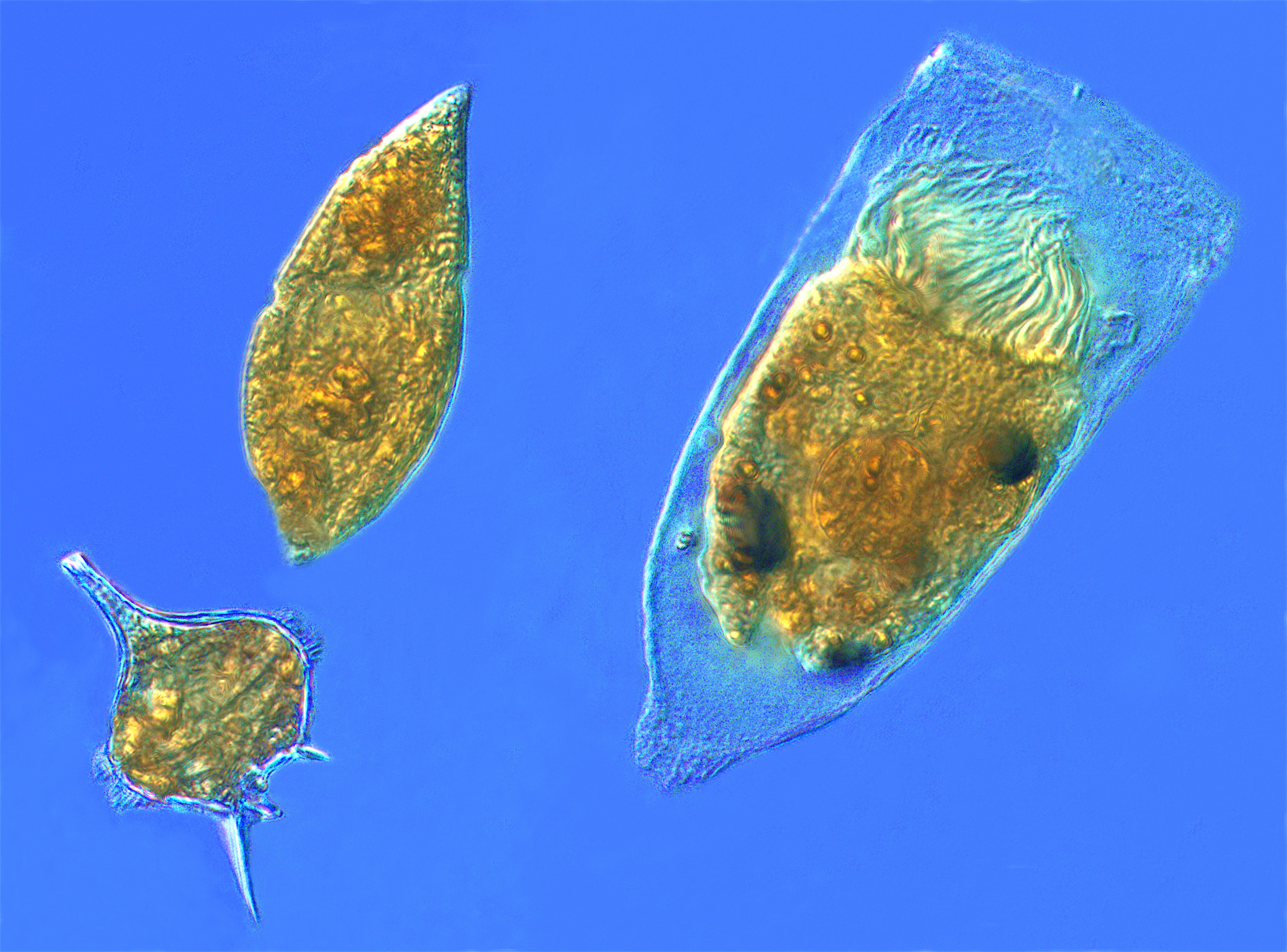
Microzooplankton are major grazers of the plankton: two dinoflagellates and a tintinnid ciliate.
Macroplankton

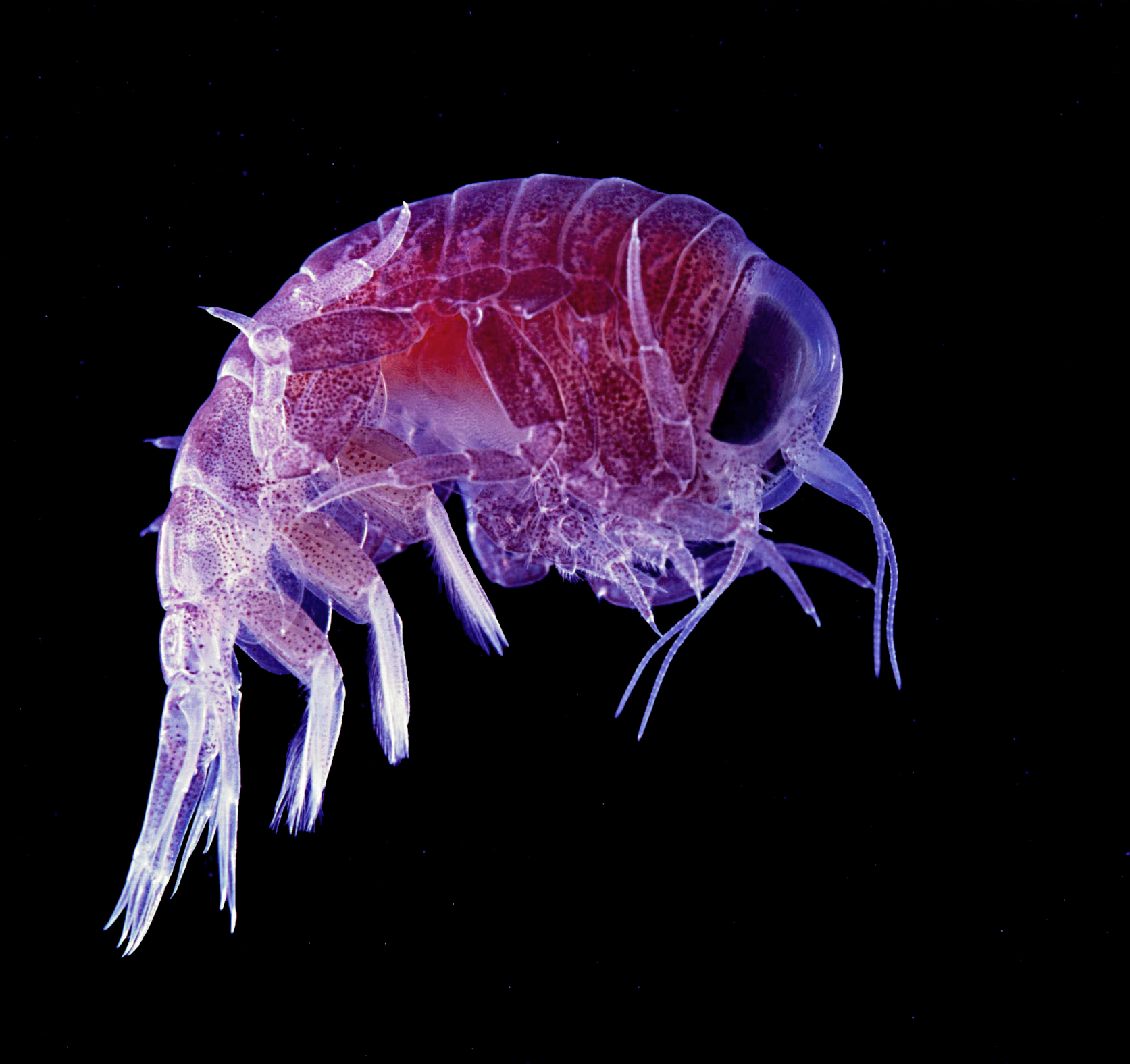
Macrozooplankton: the amphipod Hyperia macrocephala

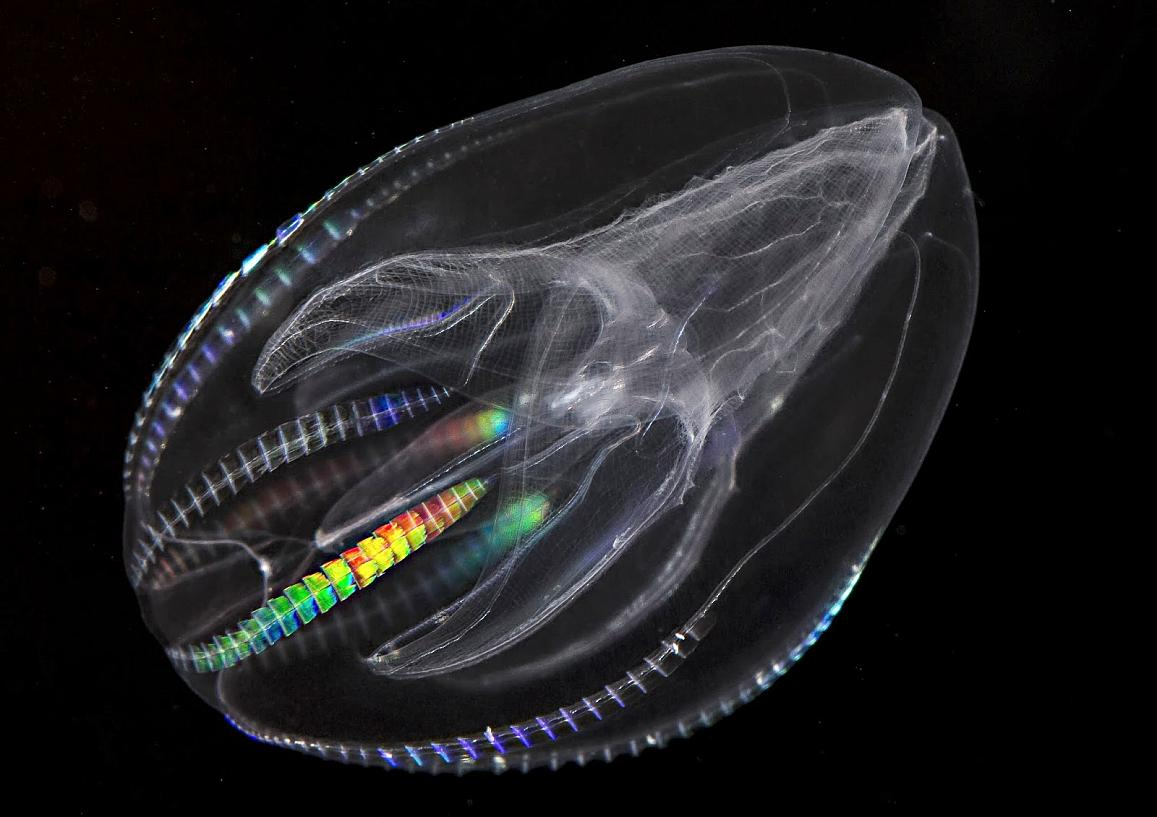
The sea walnut ctenophore has a transient anus which forms only when it needs to defecate

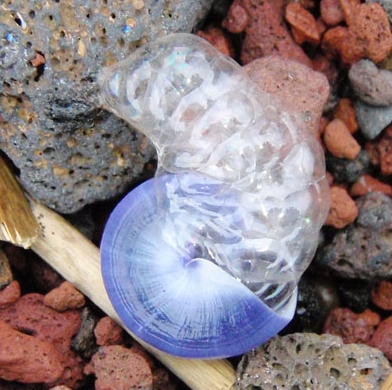
A Janthina janthina snail (with bubble float) cast up onto a beach in Maui

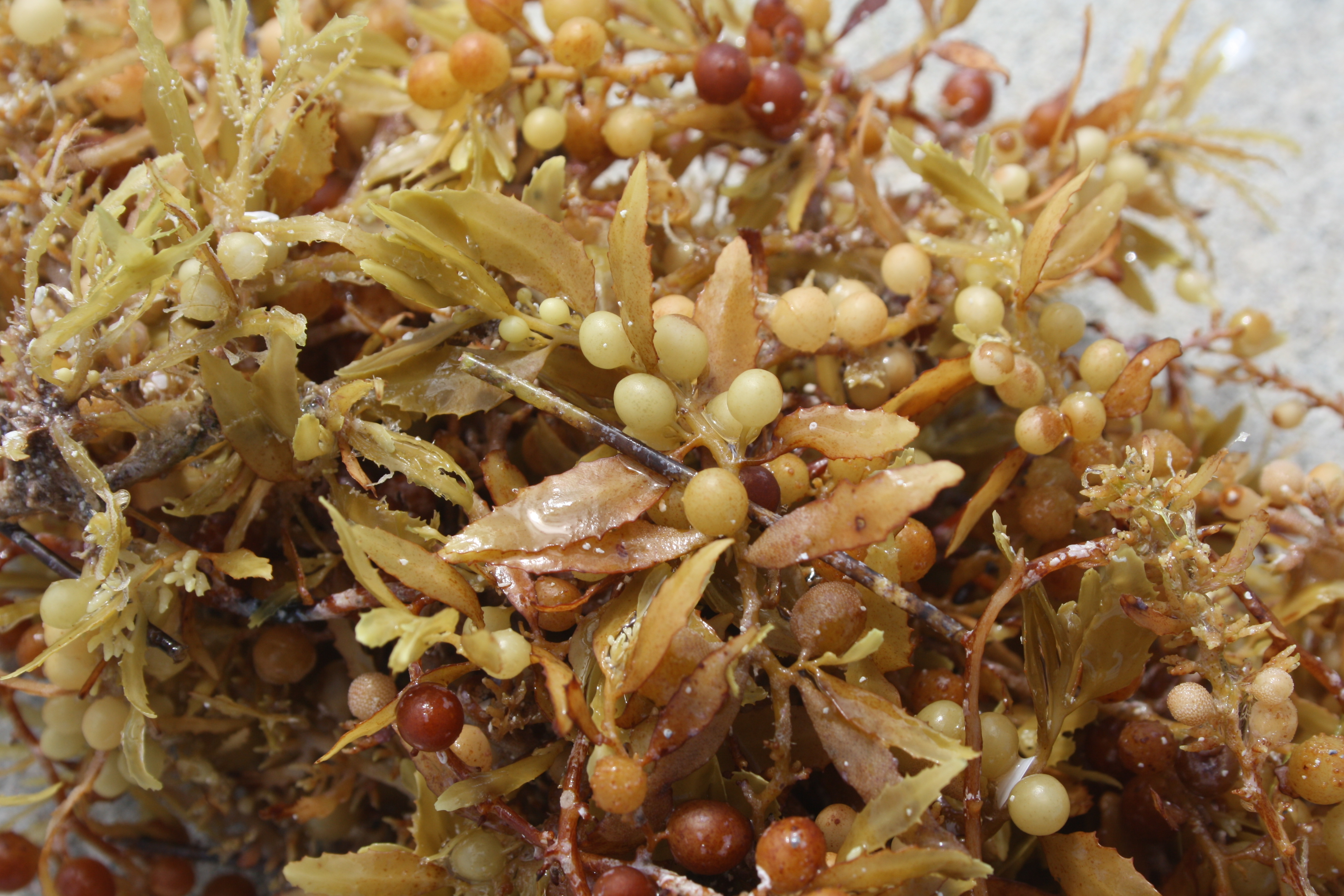
Sargassum seaweed drifts with currents using air bladders to stay afloat

== By trophic mode ==
Trophic mode describes the role of a planktonic organism in the food web based on how it obtains energy and nutrients to sustain its growth, reproduction, and survival. By trophic mode, plankton can be divided into four broad functional groups: phytoplankton, zooplankton, mixoplankton and decomposers.

=== Phytoplankton ===
Phytoplankton (from Greek phyton, or plant) are autotrophic prokaryotic or eukaryotic algae that live near the water surface where there is sufficient light to support photosynthesis. Among the more important groups are the diatoms, cyanobacteria, dinoflagellates, and coccolithophores.

Phytoplankton largely form the base of the marine food web

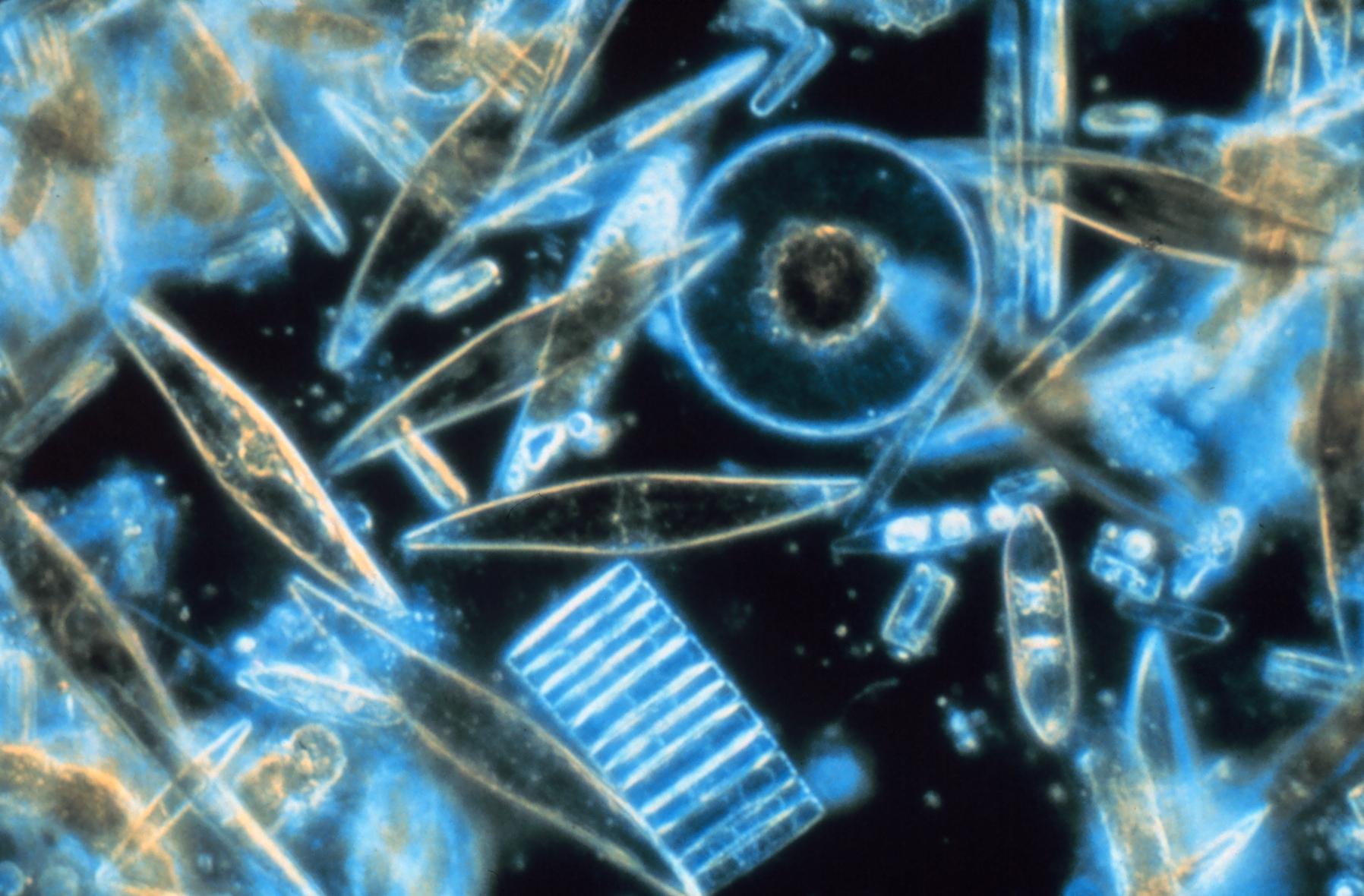
Diatoms are one of the most common types of phytoplankton

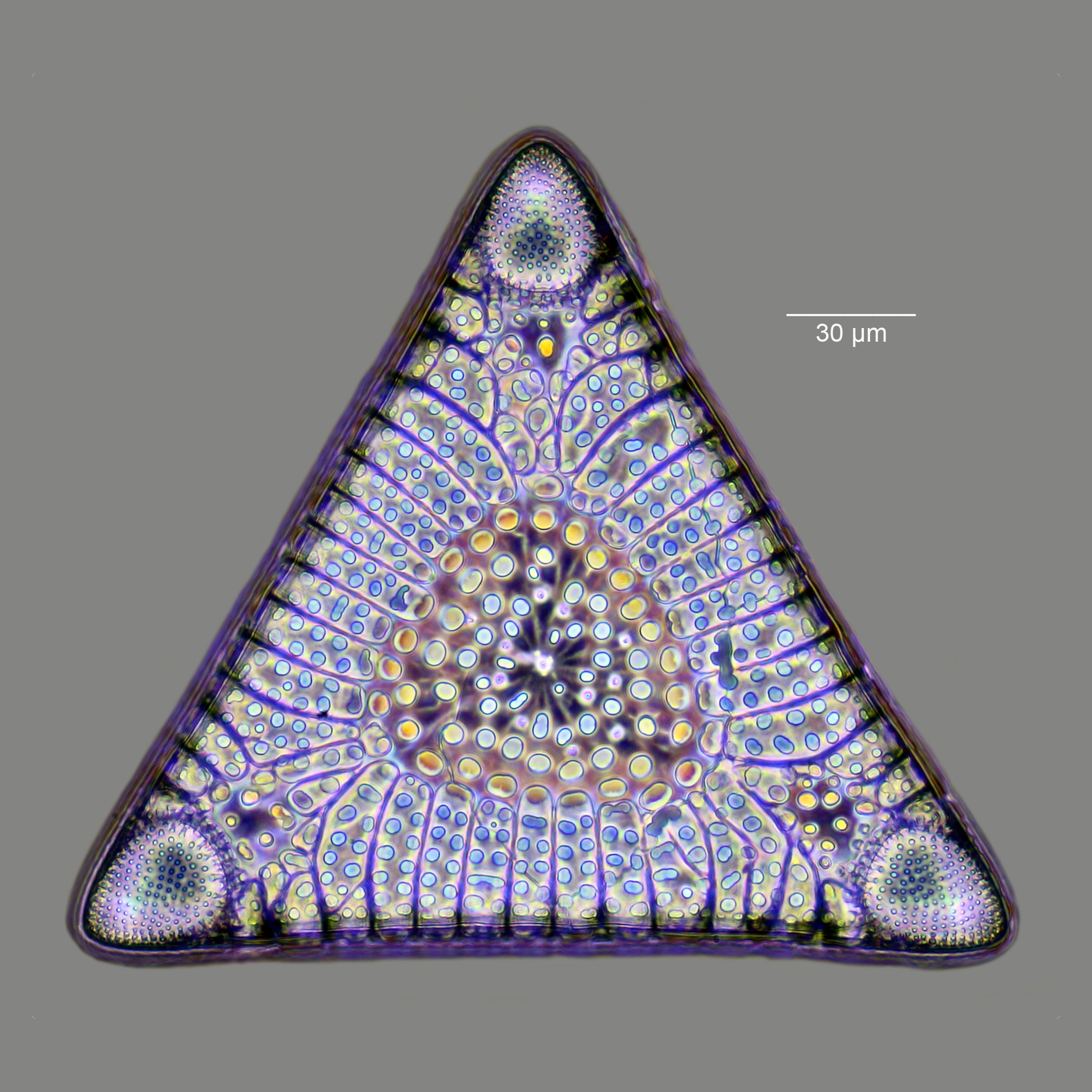
Fossil diatom frustule from 32 to 40 mya

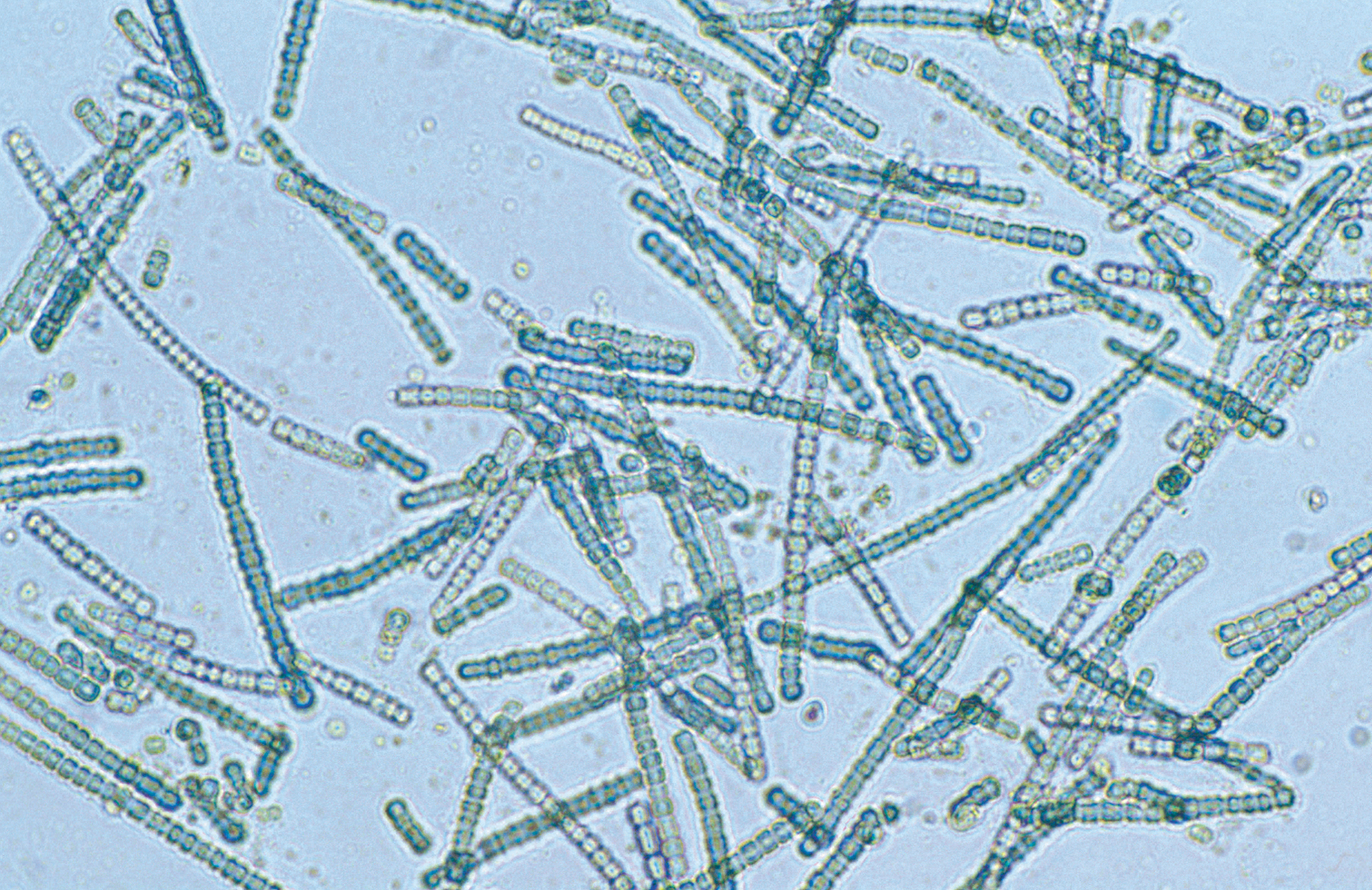
A cyanobacteria species (Cylindrospermum sp)

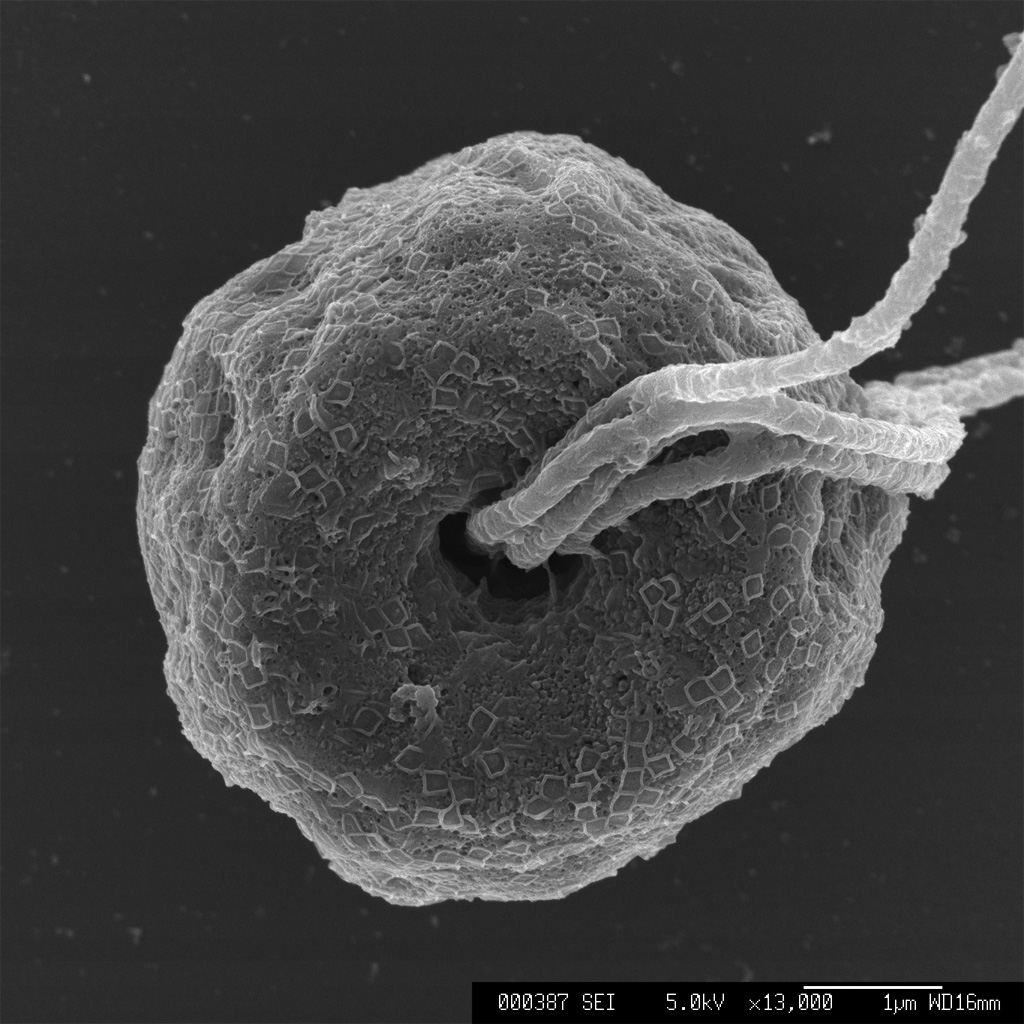
Green algae, Pyramimonas

=== Zooplankton ===
Zooplankton (from Greek zoon, or animal) are small protozoans or metazoans (e.g. crustaceans and other animals) that feed on other plankton. Some of the eggs and larvae of larger nektonic animals, such as fish, crustaceans, and annelids, are included here.

Larger plankton tend to be zooplankton which eat smaller phytoplankton

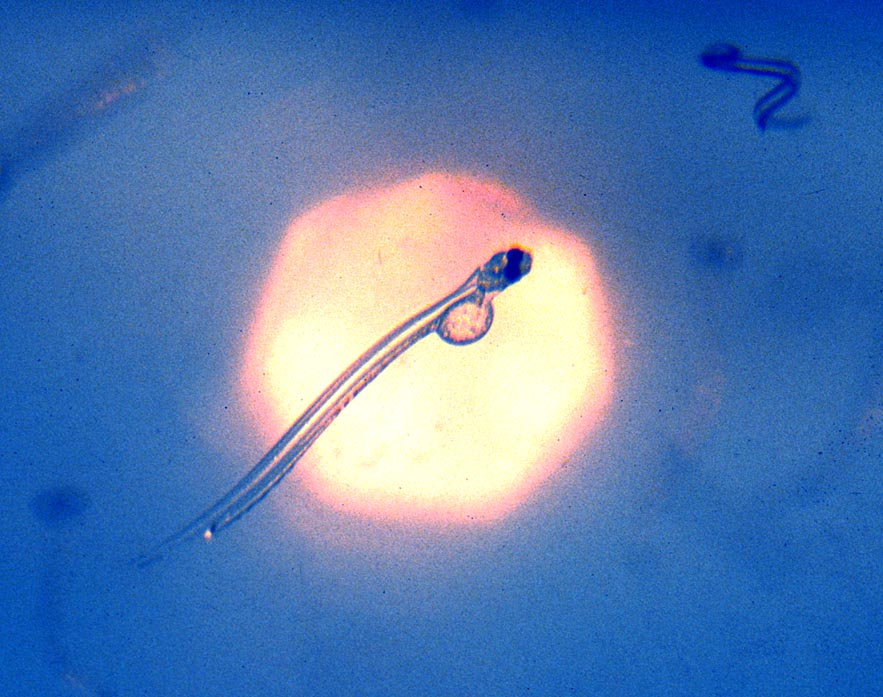
Herring larva imaged with the remains of the yolk and the long gut visible in the transparent animal

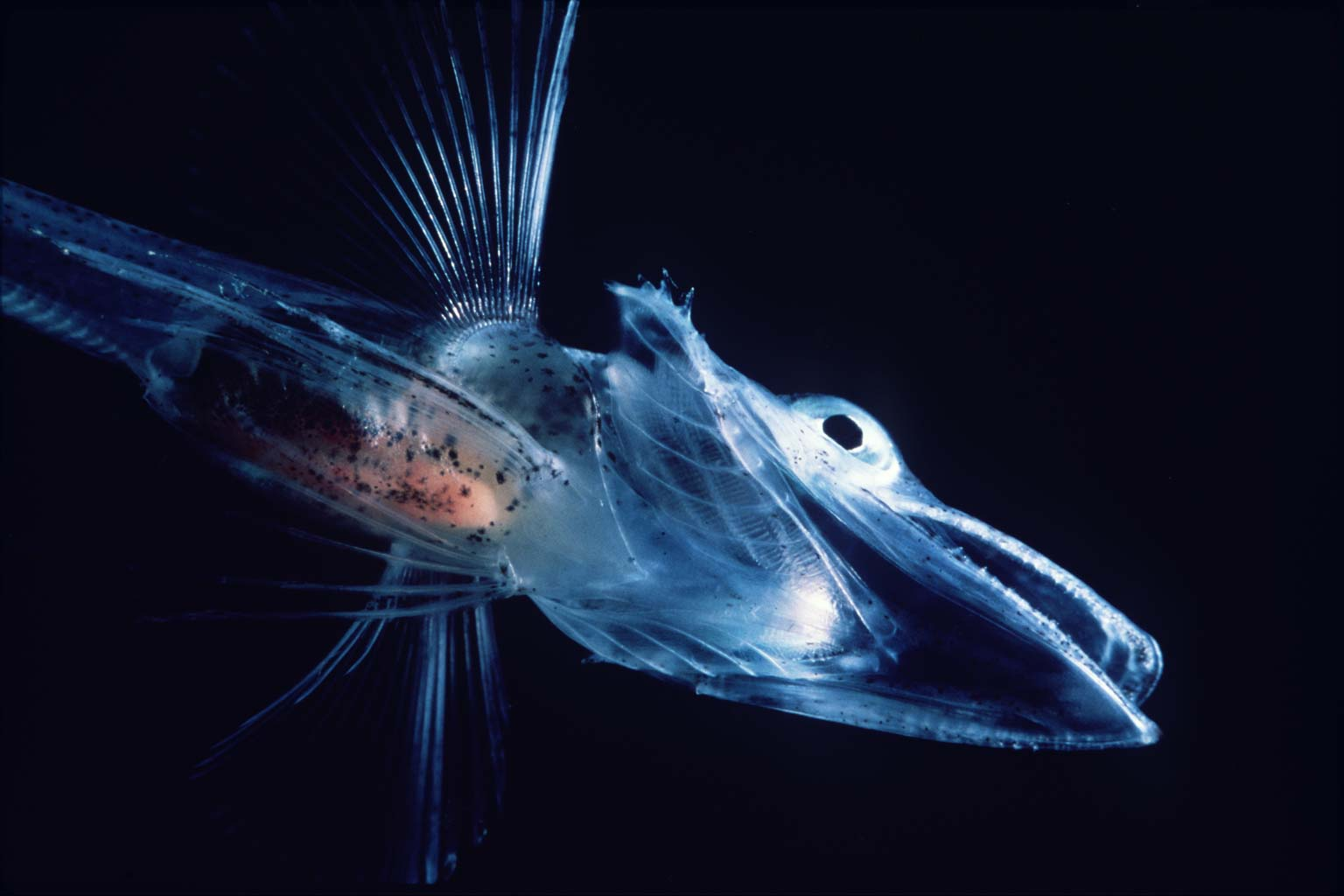
Icefish larvae from Antarctica have no haemoglobin

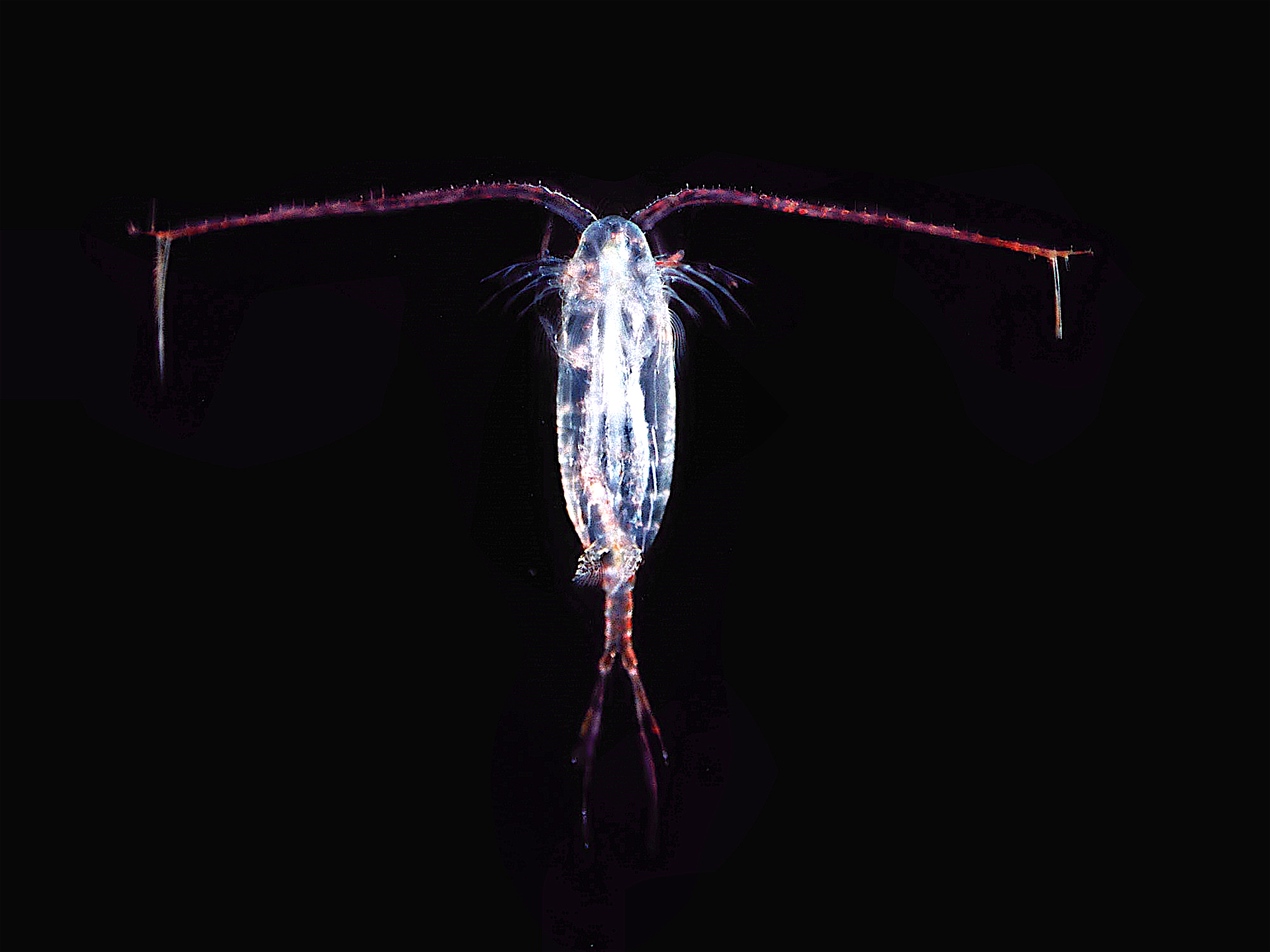
Copepod from Antarctica, a translucent ovoid microanimal with two long antennae

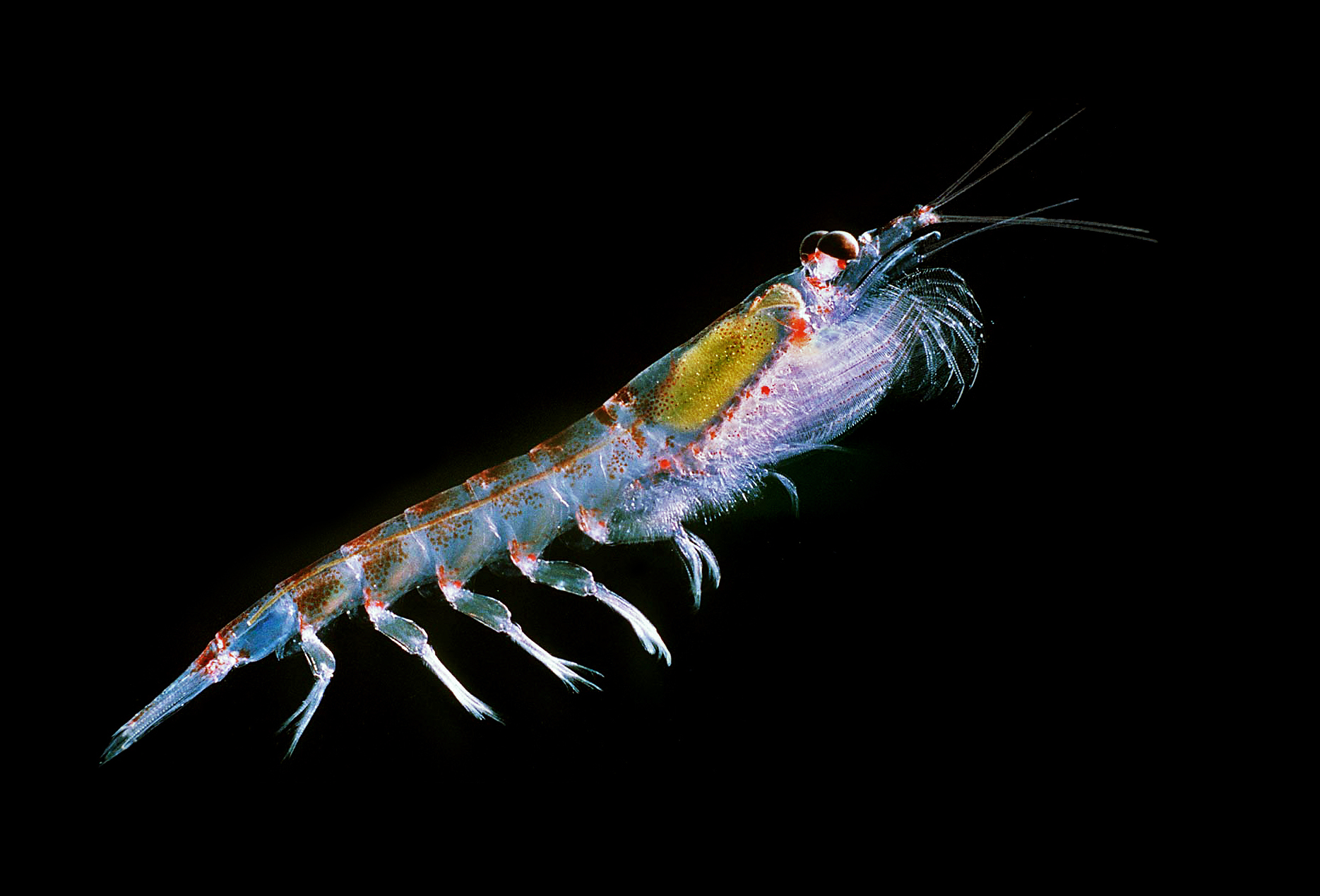
A krill larva is zooplankton, though an adult (shown) is nekton

=== Mixoplankton ===
Mixoplankton (from Greek mixis, or mixture) have a mixed trophic strategy. In recent years, there has been a growing recognition that perhaps the majority of plankton can act in both the above modes.

Traditionally, plankton were divided into just the first two broad trophic groups: plant-like phytoplankton which make their own food, usually by photosynthesis, and animal-like zooplankton that eat other plankton. In recent years, there has been a recognition that many plankton, perhaps over half, are mixotrophic. Plankton have traditionally been categorized as producer, consumer, and recycler groups, but some plankton are able to benefit from more than just one trophic level. This mixed trophic strategy means mixoplankton can act as both producers and consumers, either at the same time or switching between modes of nutrition in response to ambient conditions. In this manner, mixoplankton can use photosynthesis for growth when nutrients and light are abundant, but switch to eating phytoplankton, zooplankton or each other when growing conditions are poor.

As a result of these findings, many unicellular plankton formally categorized as phytoplankton, including coccolithophores and dinoflagellates, are longer included as strictly phytoplankton, as they not only produce their own food through phototrophy but can also ingest other organisms. These organisms are now more correctly termed mixoplankton. This recognition has important consequences for how the functioning of the planktonic food web is viewed.

Mixoplankton can behave both as phytoplankton and zooplankton

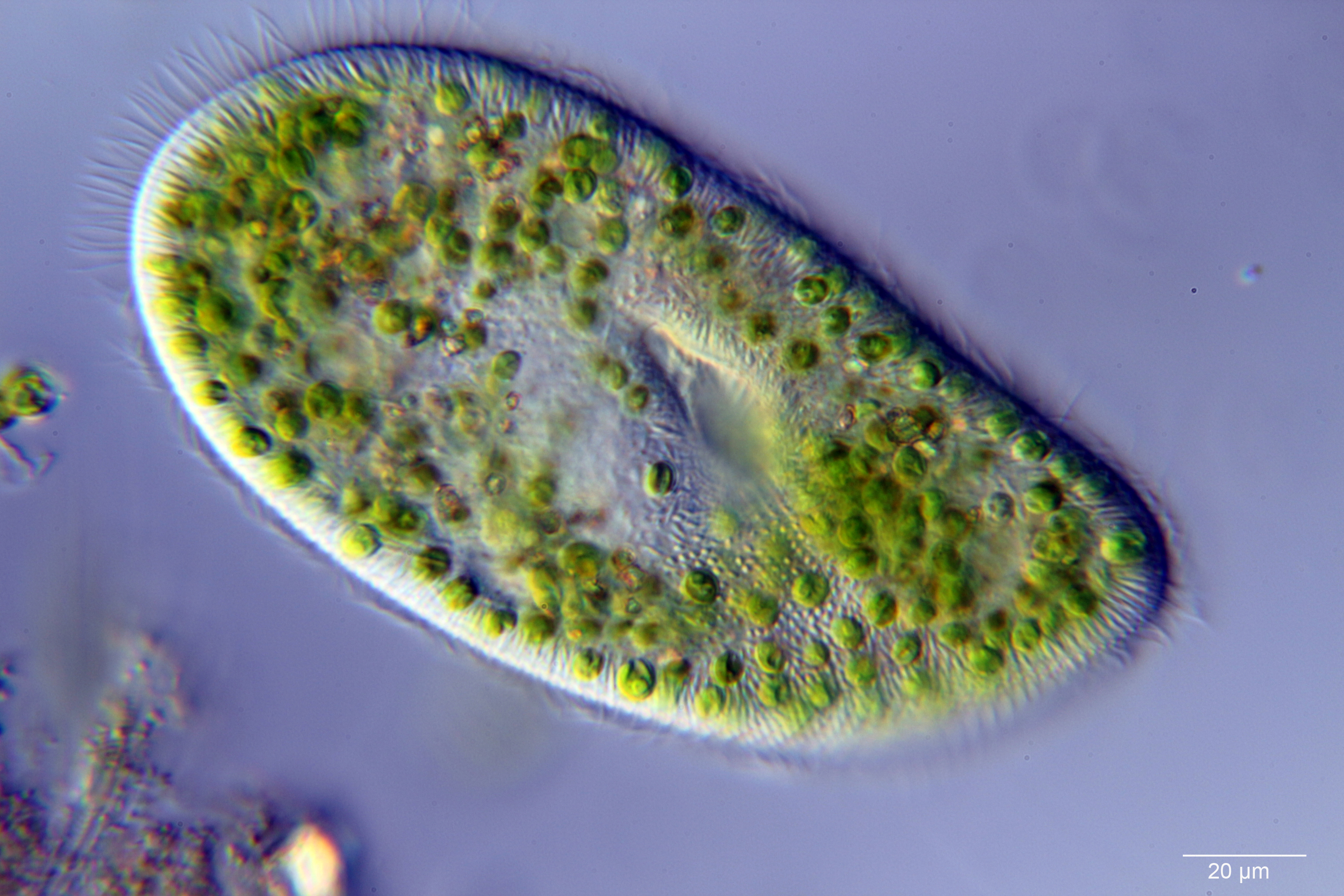
A single-celled ciliate with green zoochlorellae living inside endosymbiotically

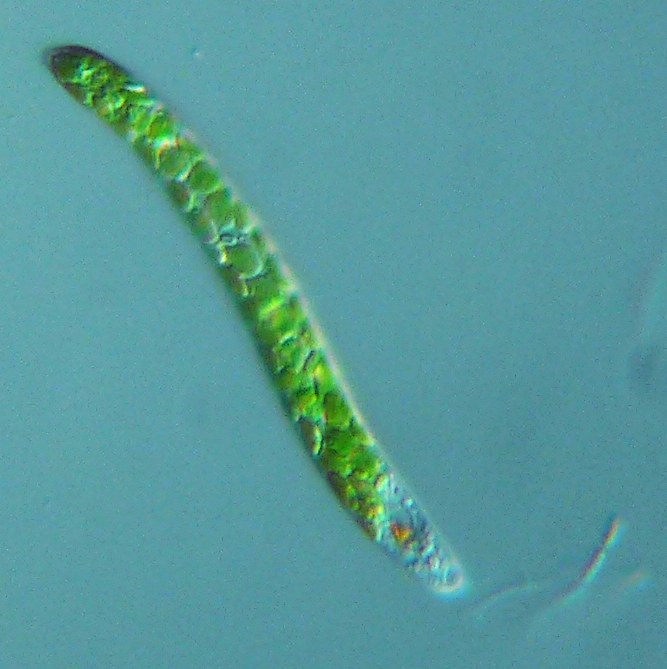
Euglena mutabilis, a photosynthetic flagellate

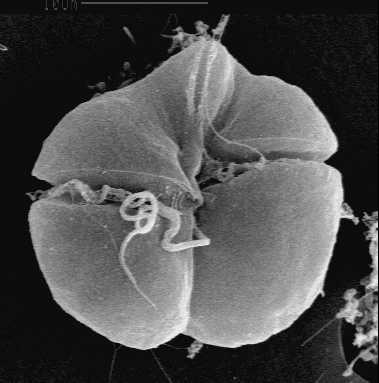
The mixotrophic dinoflagellate Karenia brevis causes harmful red tides

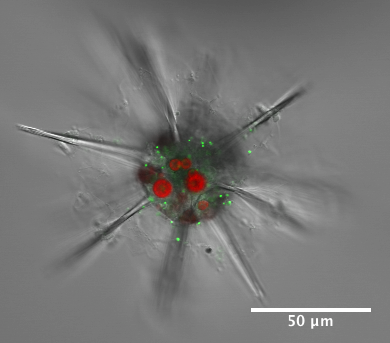
Acantharian radiolarian hosts Phaeocystis symbionts.

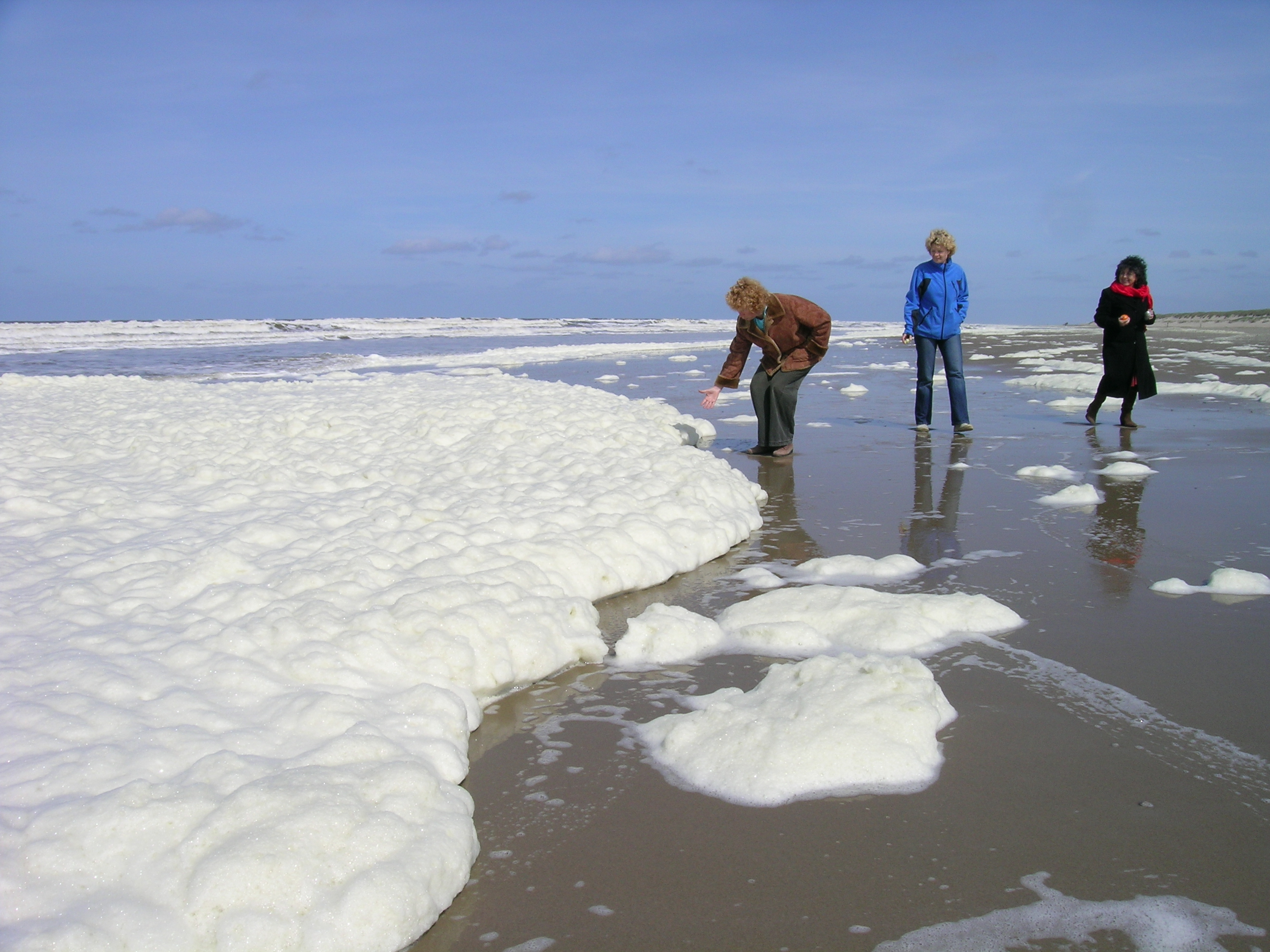
White Phaeocystis algal foam washing up on a beach

Mixotrophs can be further divided into two groups; constitutive mixotrophs which are able to perform photosynthesis on their own, and non-constitutive mixotrophs which use phagocytosis to engulf phototrophic prey that are either kept alive inside the host cell, which benefits from its photosynthesis, or they digested, except for the plastids, which continue to perform photosynthesis (kleptoplasty). Recognition of the importance of mixotrophy as an ecological strategy is increasing, as well as the wider role this may play in marine biogeochemistry. Studies have shown that mixoplankton are much more important for marine ecology than previously assumed. Their presence acts as a buffer that prevents the collapse of ecosystems during times with little to no light. Mixoplankton have ancient origins and have been recognized by scientists for over a century. However, it is only in recent years that the widespread significance of mixoplankton has been gaining recognition in mainstream marine science.

=== Decomposers ===
Instead of directly building biomass, decomposers break organic nutrients down into inorganic forms which can be recycled (an approach which metabolically can be costly).

Fungi: Mostly tiny mycoplankton (microfungi), yeast, or mobile zoospores, that can recycle organic matter through a process called the mycoloop which involves parasiting plankton.

Bacteria/Archaea: often called bacterioplankton. These minute prokaryotes (typically <0.001mm) return organic nutrients to inorganic forms by breaking down particulate and dissolved organic matter through the process called the microbial loop. This process recycles nutrients, like nitrogen and phosphorus, back into the water for primary producers like phytoplankton to use again. Some convert ammonium in animal waste to nitrate, while others transform nitrate to nitrogen gas. Viral infections likely destroy many, while others are eaten by protist zooplankton and mixoplankton, which use their nutrients for photosynthesis. However details of their ecology is complex and it is not clear what sustains them.

Viruses: Typically 10 to 100 times smaller than bacteria and also the most abundant (~100 billion per litre), viruses infect other plankton and larger organisms. It is thought they efficiently halt vast plankton blooms within days, by turning biomass into dissolved organic matter that supports bacterial growth through a process called the viral shunt. Being host-specific, they also likely influence the biological and microbial carbon pumps.

== Other groups ==
=== Gelatinous zooplankton ===
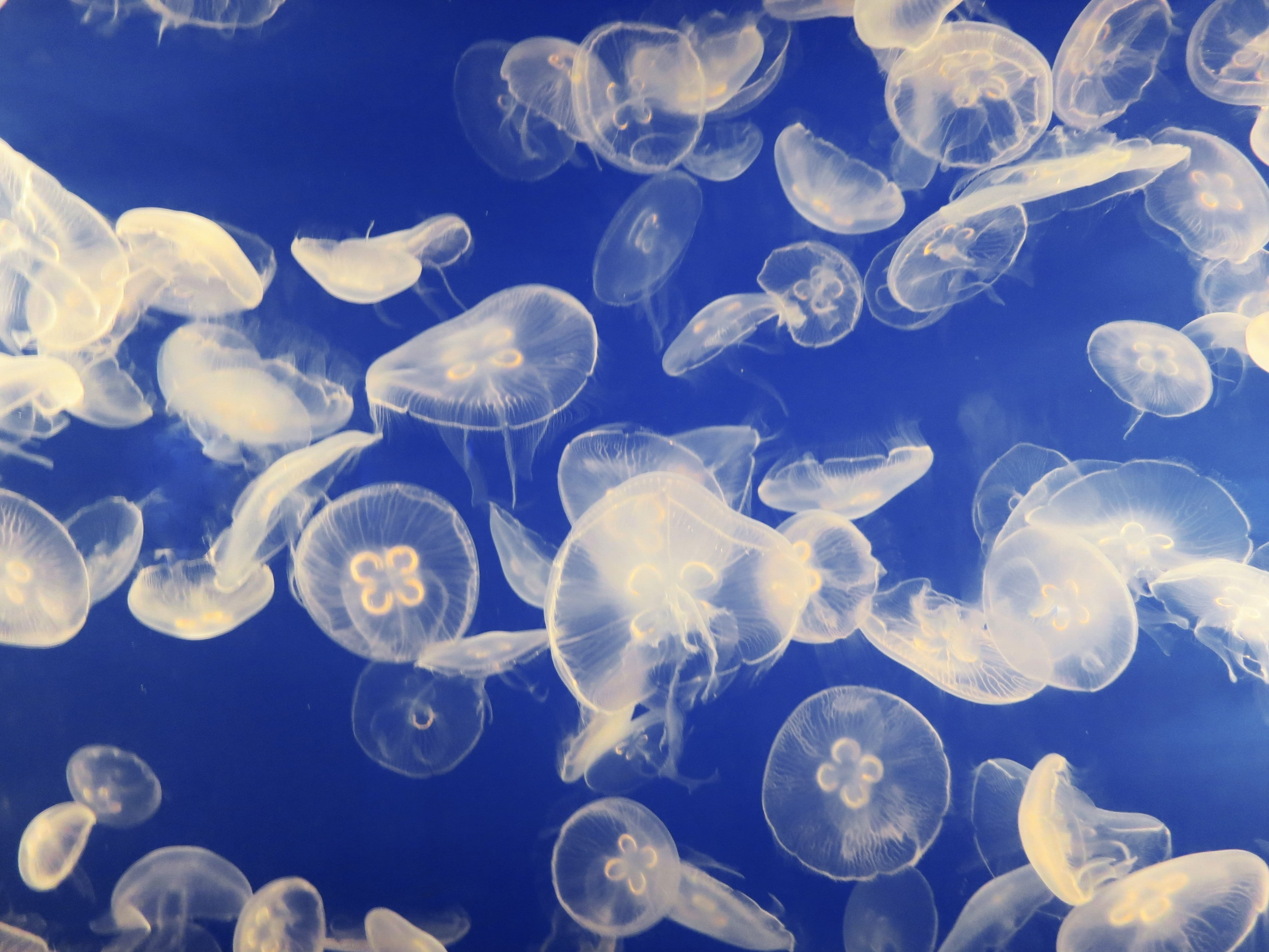
Jellyfish are gelatinous zooplankton.

Gelatinous zooplankton are fragile animals that live in the water column in the ocean. Their delicate bodies have no hard parts and are easily damaged or destroyed. Gelatinous zooplankton are often transparent. All jellyfish are gelatinous zooplankton, but not all gelatinous zooplankton are jellyfish. The most commonly encountered organisms include ctenophores, medusae, salps, and Chaetognatha in coastal waters. However, almost all marine phyla, including Annelida, Mollusca and Arthropoda, contain gelatinous species, but many of those odd species live in the open ocean and the deep sea and are less available to the casual ocean observer.

=== Ichthyoplankton ===
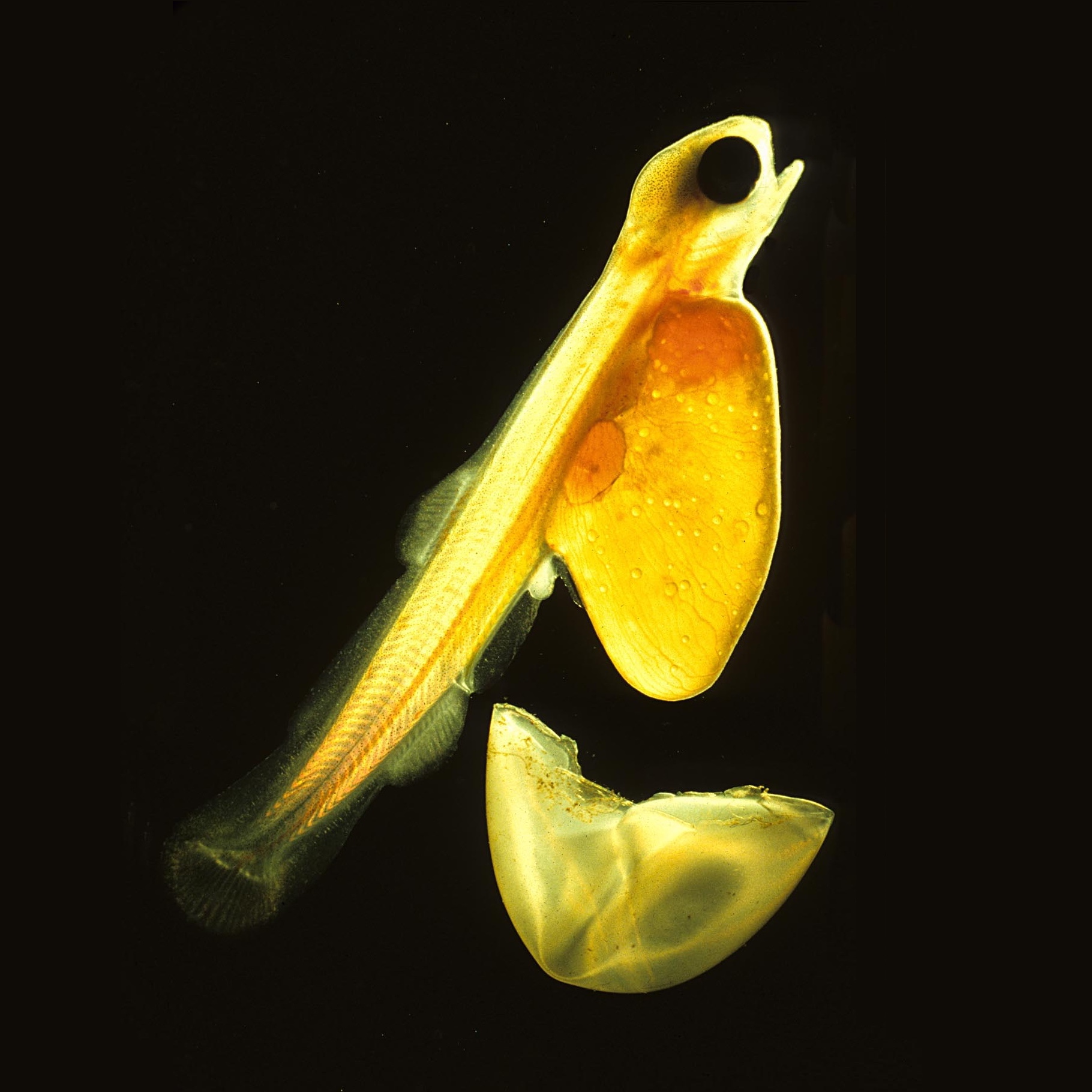
Salmon egg hatching into a sac fry. In a few days, the sac fry will absorb the yolk sac and start feeding on smaller plankton.

Ichthyoplankton are the eggs and larvae of fish. They are mostly found in the sunlit zone of the water column, less than 200 metres deep, which is sometimes called the epipelagic or photic zone. Ichthyoplankton are planktonic, meaning they cannot swim effectively under their own power, but must drift with the ocean currents. Fish eggs cannot swim at all, and are unambiguously planktonic. Early stage larvae swim poorly, but later stage larvae swim better and cease to be planktonic as they grow into juveniles. Fish larvae are part of the zooplankton that eat smaller plankton, while fish eggs carry their own food supply. Both eggs and larvae are themselves eaten by larger animals. Fish can produce high numbers of eggs which are often released into the open water column. Fish eggs typically have a diameter of about 1 millimetre (0.039 in). The newly hatched young of oviparous fish are called larvae. They are usually poorly formed, carry a large yolk sac (for nourishment), and are very different in appearance from juvenile and adult specimens. The larval period in oviparous fish is relatively short (usually only several weeks), and larvae rapidly grow and change appearance and structure (a process termed metamorphosis) to become juveniles. During this transition larvae must switch from their yolk sac to feeding on zooplankton prey, a process which depends on typically inadequate zooplankton density, starving many larvae. In time fish larvae become able to swim against currents, at which point they cease to be plankton and become juvenile fish.

=== Pseudoplankton ===
Pseudoplankton are organisms that attach themselves to planktonic organisms or other floating objects, such as drifting wood, buoyant shells of organisms such as Spirula, or man-made flotsam. Examples include goose barnacles and the bryozoan Jellyella. By themselves these animals cannot float, which contrasts them with true planktonic organisms, such as Velella and the Portuguese Man o' War, which are buoyant. Pseudoplankton are often found in the guts of filtering zooplankters.

=== Tychoplankton ===
Tychoplankton are organisms, such as free-living or attached benthic organisms and other non-planktonic organisms, that are carried into the plankton through a disturbance of their benthic habitat, or by winds and currents. This can occur by direct turbulence or by disruption of the substrate and subsequent entrainment in the water column. Tychoplankton are, therefore, a primary subdivision for sorting planktonic organisms by duration of lifecycle spent in the plankton, as neither their entire lives nor particular reproductive portions are confined to planktonic existence. Tychoplankton are sometimes called accidental plankton.

=== Mineralized plankton ===
Some plankton are protected with mineralized shells or tests.

Diatoms have glass shells (frustules) and produce much of the world's oxygen.

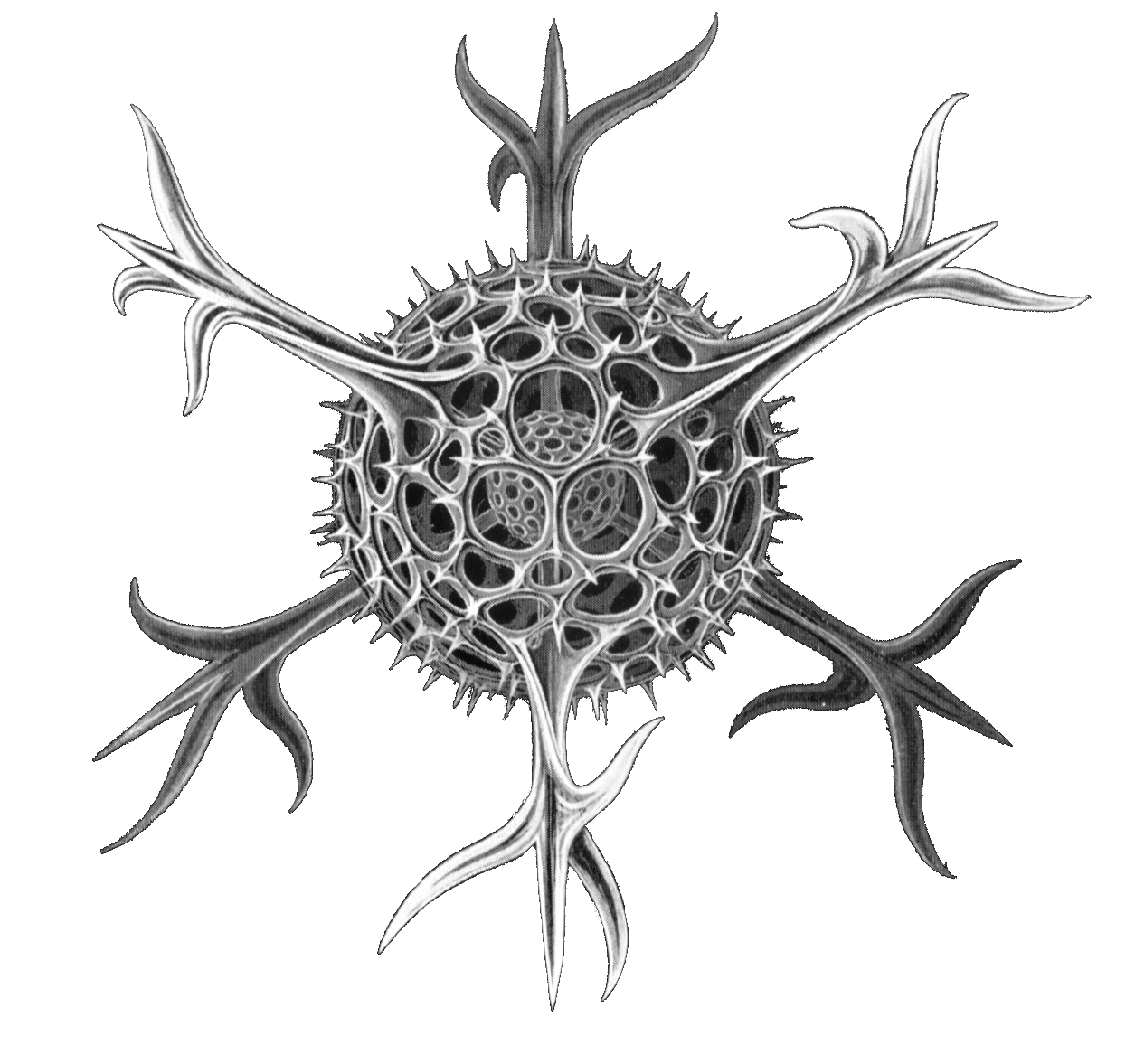
The elaborate silica shells of microscopic marine radiolarians can eventually produce opal.

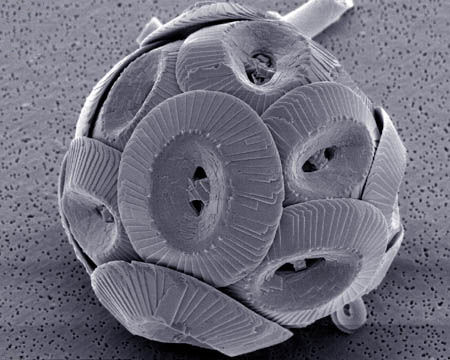
Coccolithophores have chalk plates called coccoliths, and produced the Cliffs of Dover.

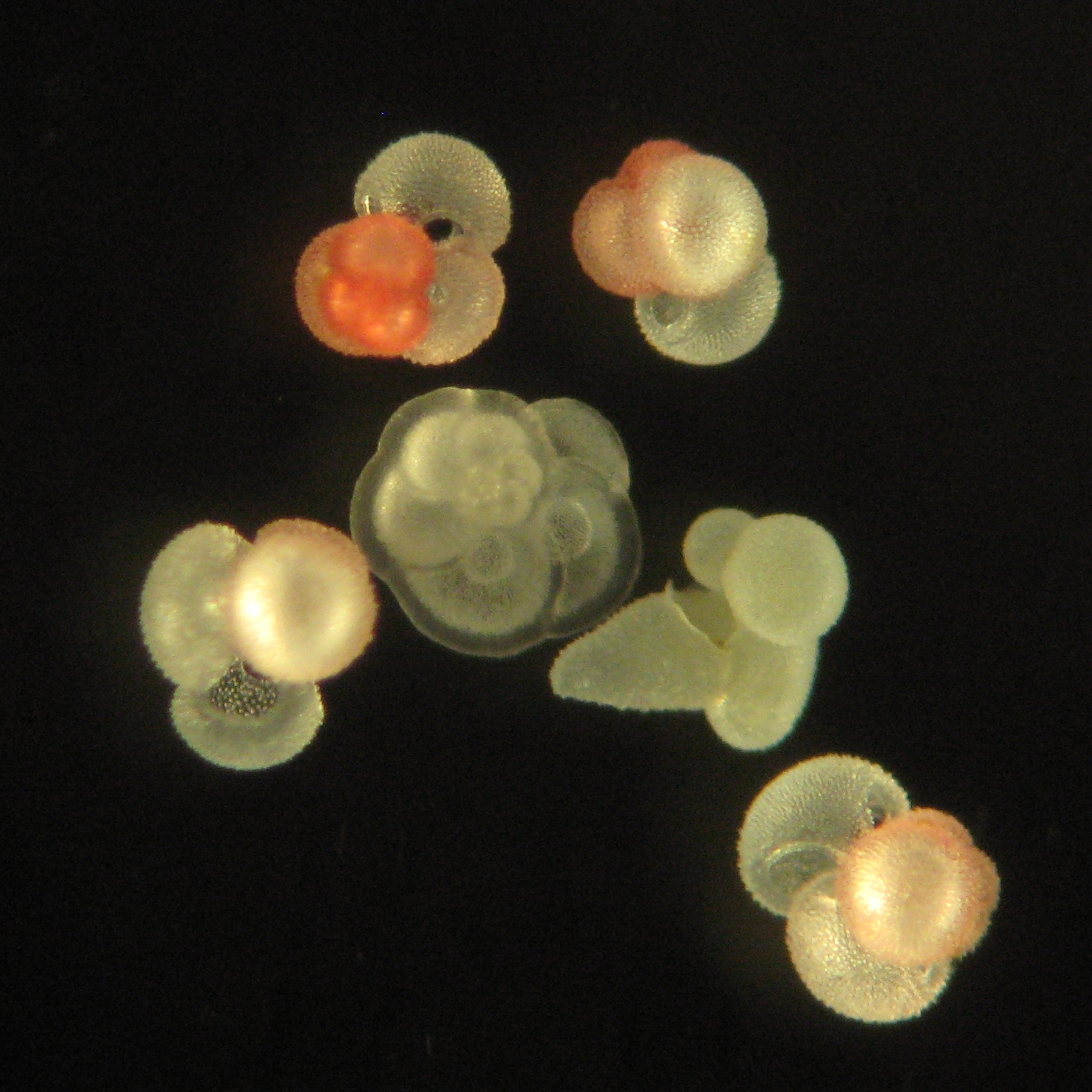
Foraminiferans have calcium carbonate shells and produced the limestone in the Great Pyramids.

=== By life cycle ===
==== Holoplankton ====
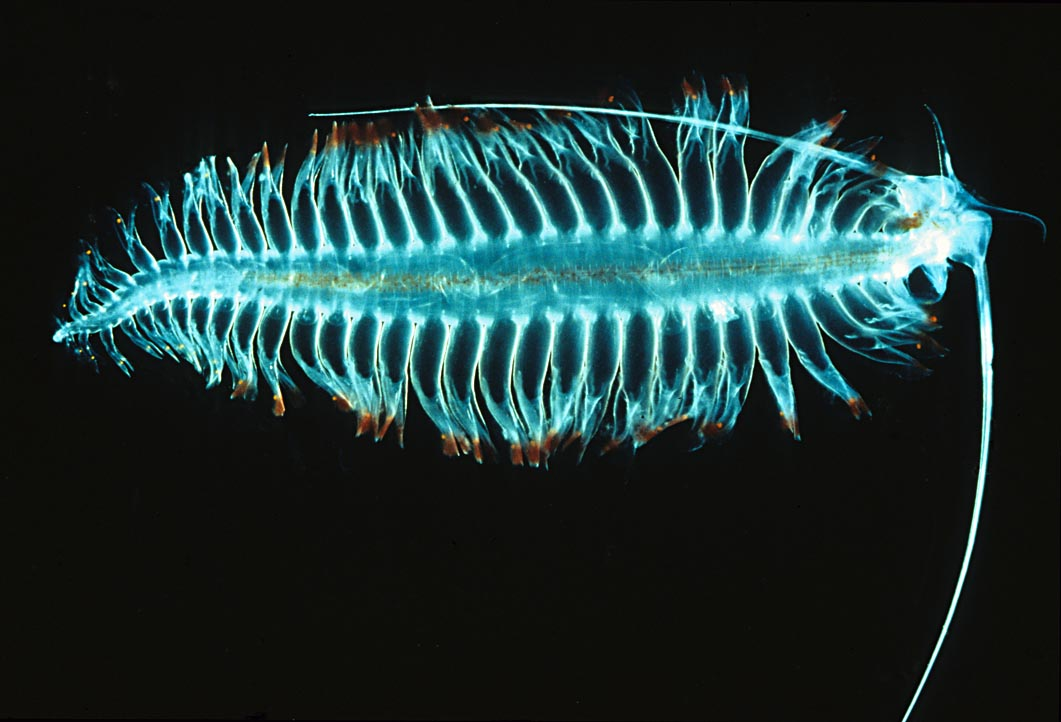
Tomopteris, a holoplanktic bioluminescence polychaete worm

Holoplankton are organisms that are planktic for their entire life cycle. Holoplankton can be contrasted with meroplankton, which are planktic organisms that spend part of their life cycle in the benthic zone. Examples of holoplankton include some diatoms, radiolarians, some dinoflagellates, foraminifera, amphipods, copepods, and salps, as well as some gastropod mollusk species. Holoplankton dwell in the pelagic zone as opposed to the benthic zone. Holoplankton include both phytoplankton and zooplankton and vary in size. The most common plankton are protists.

==== Meroplankton ====
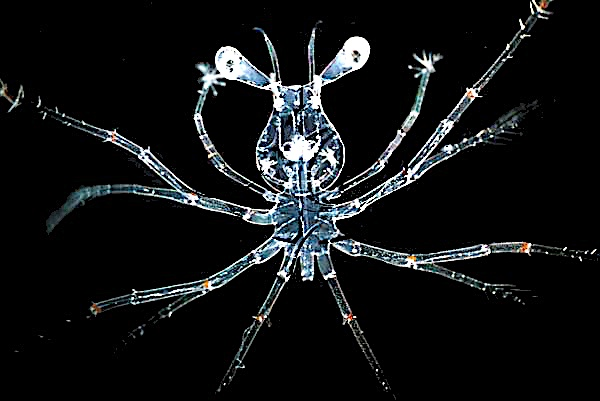
Larva stage of a spiny lobster

Meroplankton are a wide variety of aquatic organisms that have both planktonic and benthic stages in their life cycles. Much of the meroplankton consists of larval stages of larger organisms. Meroplankton can be contrasted with holoplankton, which are planktonic organisms that stay in the pelagic zone as plankton throughout their entire life cycle. After some time in the plankton, many meroplankton graduate to the nekton or adopt a benthic (often sessile) lifestyle on the seafloor. The larval stages of benthic invertebrates make up a significant proportion of planktonic communities. The planktonic larval stage is particularly crucial to many benthic invertebrates in order to disperse their young. Depending on the particular species and the environmental conditions, larval or juvenile-stage meroplankton may remain in the pelagic zone for durations ranging from hours to months.

== Ecology ==
=== Food webs ===
As well as representing the lower levels of a food chain that supports commercially important fisheries, plankton ecosystems play a role in the biogeochemical cycles of many important chemical elements, including the ocean's carbon cycle. Fish larvae mainly eat zooplankton, which in turn eat phytoplankton

The microbial loop: Bacteria play central roles in aquatic food webs. The microbial loop refers to a process in aquatic ecosystems where bacteria consume dissolved organic matter (DOM) and are then consumed by larger microorganisms, effectively cycling nutrients and energy within the ecosystem.

The viral shunt: Viruses also play central roles in aquatic food webs. The viral shunt is a process where viruses infect and lyse (burst) host cells, releasing cellular contents (including dissolved organic matter) that can be utilized by other microplankton like bacteria, effectively bypassing the traditional food web pathways. This process plays a significant role in nutrient cycling and carbon flow within aquatic ecosystems.

Fungi have a role as well. The mycoloop is a specific aquatic food web pathway where parasitic chytrid fungi infect large, inedible phytoplankton, and their zoospores (a type of spore) become a food source for zooplankton. In this manner, the chytrid fungi transfer nutrients from otherwise unusable phytoplankton to zooplankton.

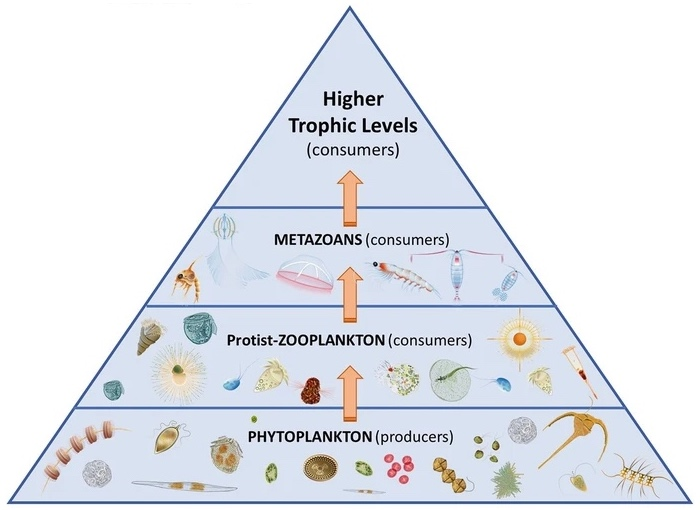
Marine food web
traditional paradigm

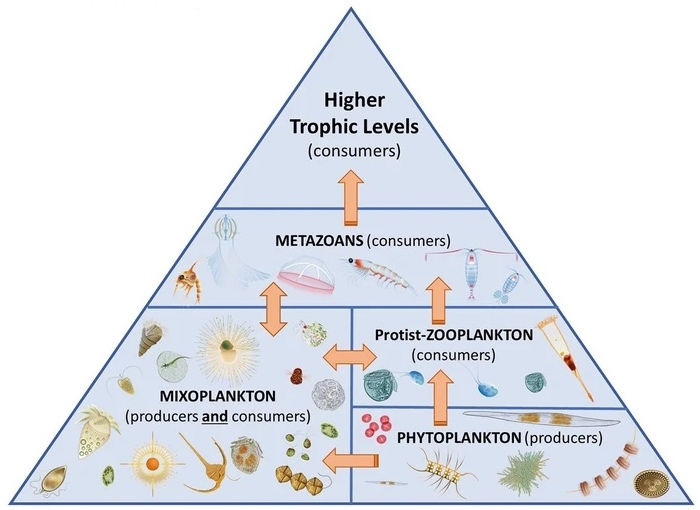
Marine food web
mixoplankton paradigm

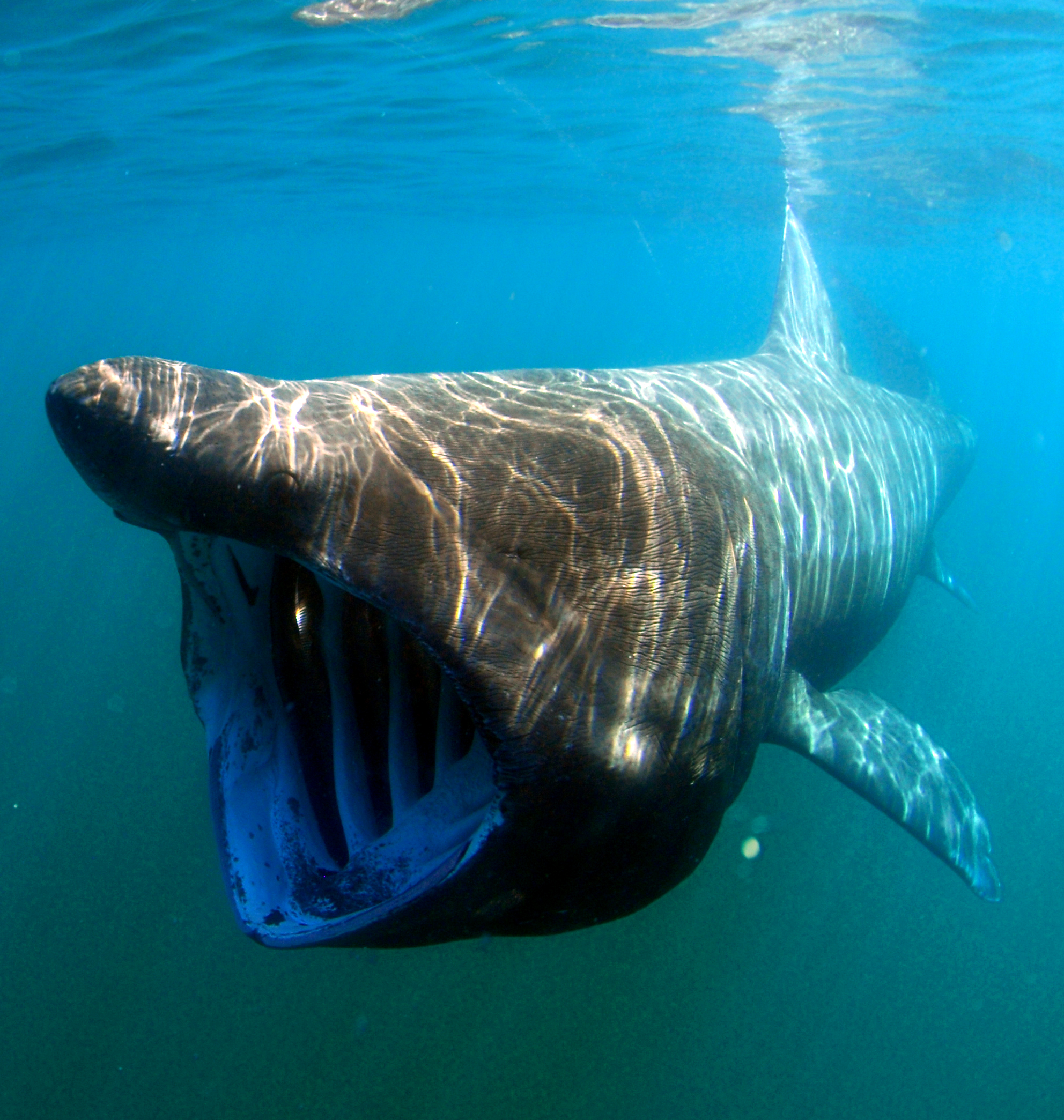
The basking shark uses filter feeding to strain plankton from the water.

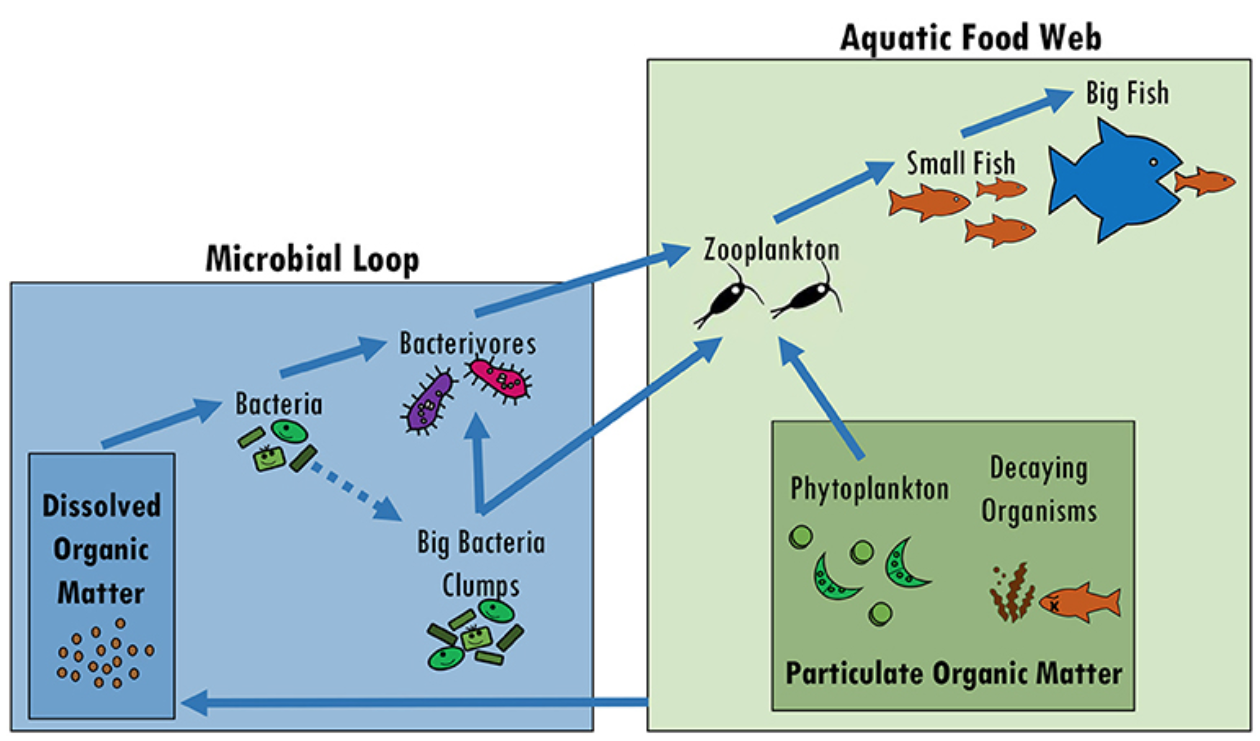
The microbial loop: The link between the microbial loop and the aquatic food web. Dissolved organic matter (DOM) becomes particulate organic matter (POM) as bacteria eat it and grow to form clumps. Small clumps of organic matter are eaten by bacterivores and zooplankton eat both bacterivores and big clumps of organic matter. Zooplankton are then eaten by fish. Dissolved organic matter is leaked or excreted by zooplankton and fish, and the cycle, called the microbial loop, starts over. Blue arrows show the movement of organic matter from the microbial loop to the food web and back.

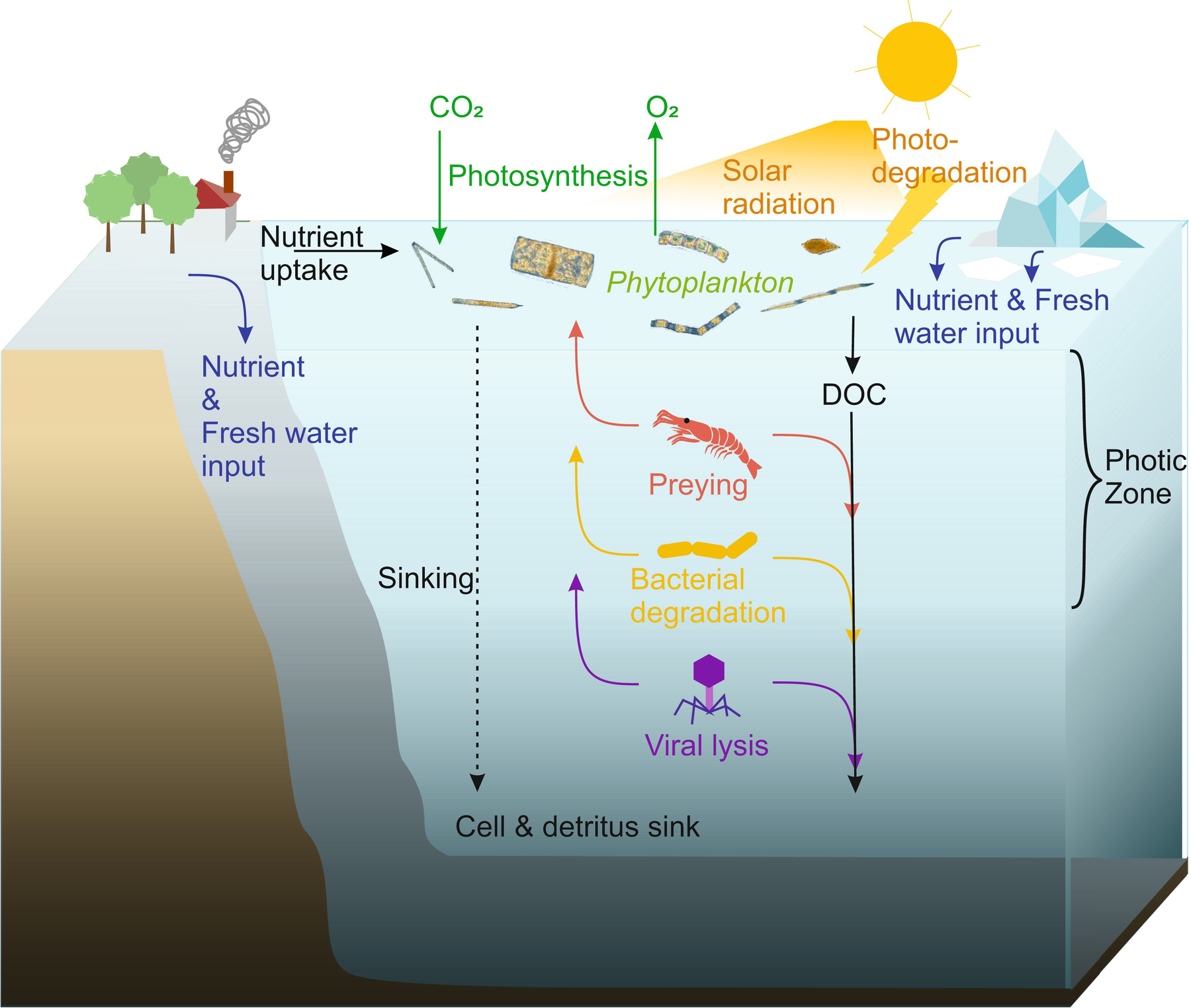
The viral shunt: Phytoplankton live in the photic zone of the ocean, where photosynthesis is possible. During photosynthesis, they assimilate carbon dioxide and release oxygen. For growth, phytoplankton cells depend on nutrients, which enter the ocean by rivers, continental weathering, and glacial ice meltwater on the poles. Phytoplankton release dissolved organic carbon (DOC) into the ocean. Since phytoplankton are the basis of marine food webs, they serve as prey for zooplankton, fish larvae and other heterotrophic organisms. They can also be degraded by bacteria or by viral lysis.

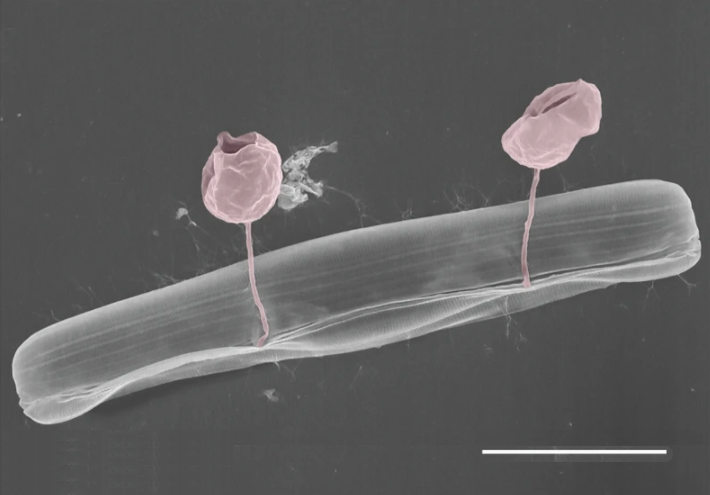
Pennate diatom from an Arctic meltpond, infected with two chytrid-like fungal pathogens (in false-colour red). Scale bar = 10 μm.

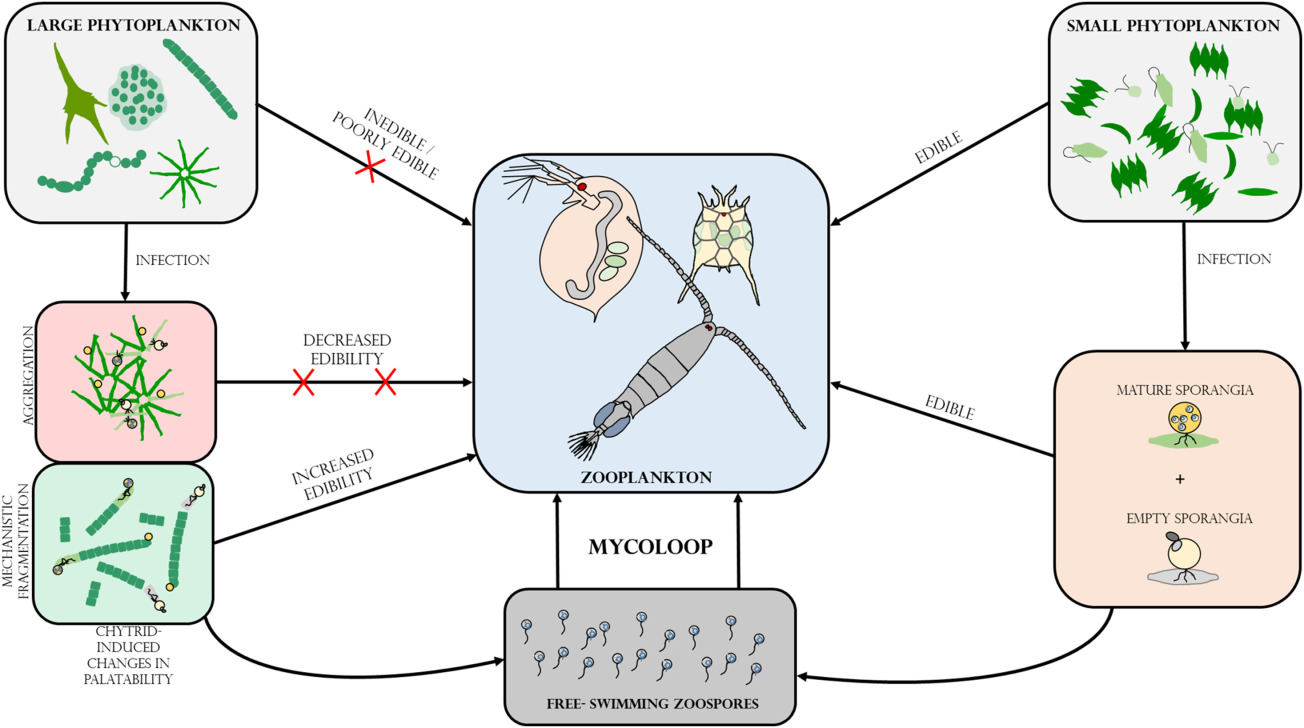
The mycoloop: Small phytoplankton can be grazed upon by zooplankton, but large phytoplankton are not easy to eat, or are even inedible. Chytrid infections on large phytoplankton can make them more palatabile, as a result of host aggregation (reduced edibility) or mechanistic fragmentation of cells or filaments (increased palatability). First, chytrid parasites extract and repack nutrients and energy from their hosts in form of readily edible zoospores. Second, infected and fragmented hosts including attached sporangia can also be ingested by grazers.

=== Carbon cycle ===
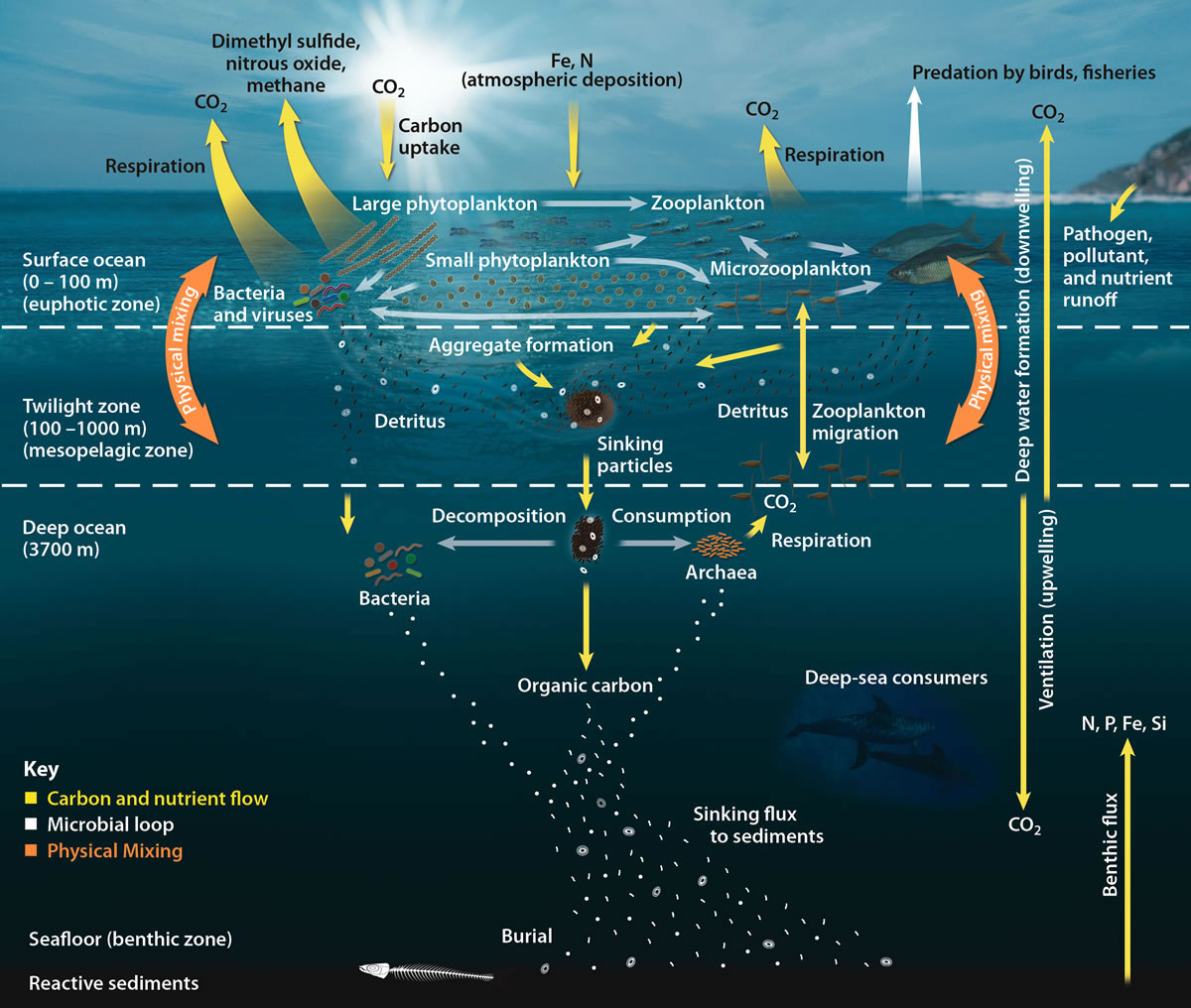
The ocean food web, showing the central involvement of marine microplankton in how the ocean imports nutrients from and then exports them back to the atmosphere and ocean floor

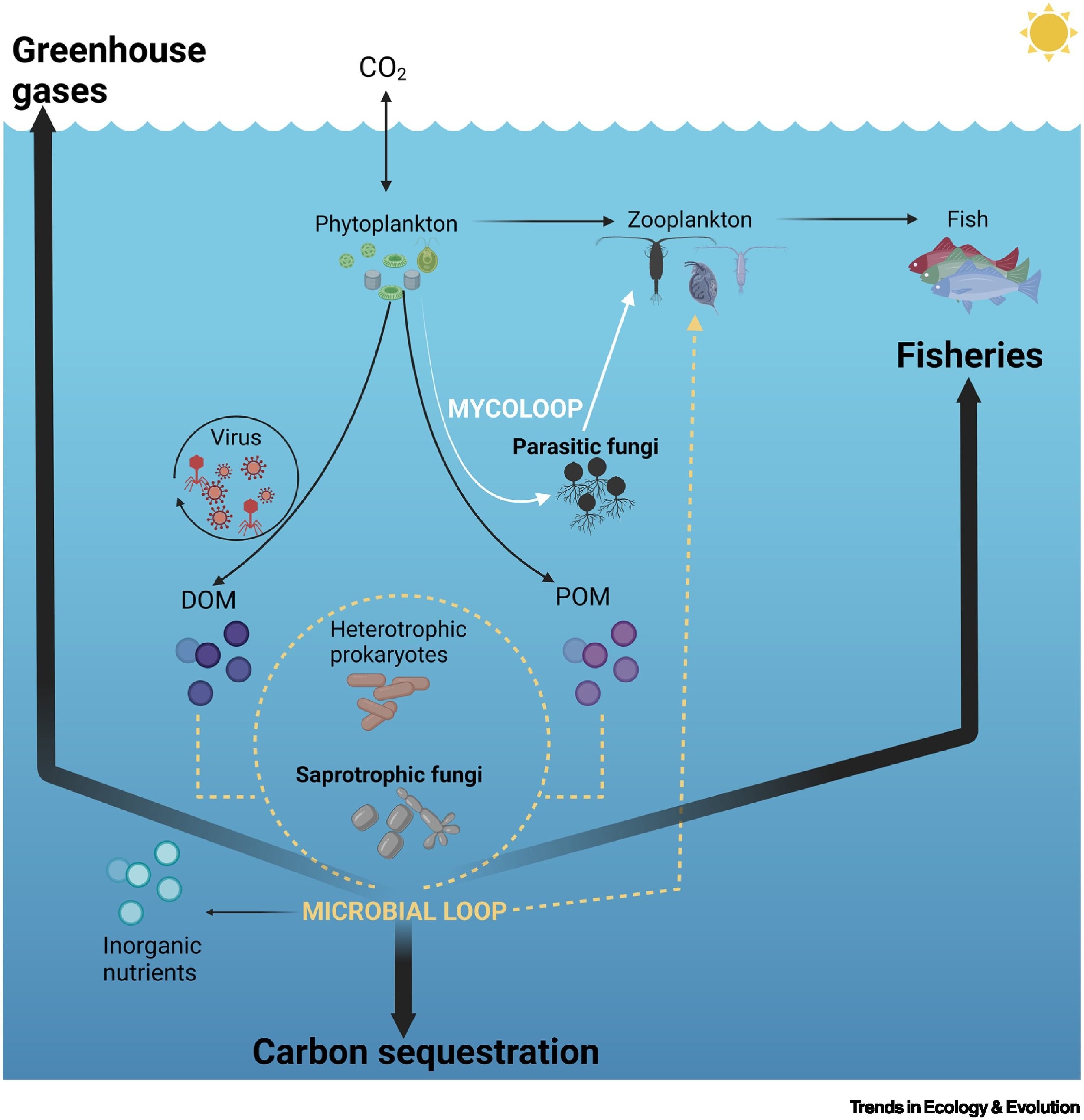
The central role played by pelagic fungi, both parasitic and saprotrophic in the mycoloop, and saprotrophic fungi as active contributors to the microbial loop. The activity of heterotrophic microbes, including pelagic fungi, has far-reaching global implications for fisheries (i.e., the amount of carbon that will ultimately flow to higher trophic levels) and climate change (i.e., the amount of carbon that will be sequestered in the ocean or respired back to CO_{2} and the release of other greenhouse gases; e.g., N_{2}O.

Primarily by grazing on phytoplankton, zooplankton provide carbon to the planktic foodweb, either respiring it to provide metabolic energy, or upon death as biomass or detritus. Organic material tends to be denser than seawater, so it sinks into open ocean ecosystems away from the coastlines, transporting carbon along with it. This process, called the biological pump, is one reason that oceans constitute the largest carbon sink on Earth. However, it has been shown to be influenced by increments of temperature. In 2019, a study indicated that at ongoing rates of seawater acidification, Antarctic phytoplankton could become smaller and less effective at storing carbon before the end of the century.

It might be possible to increase the ocean's uptake of carbon dioxide (CO_{2}) generated through human activities by increasing plankton production through iron fertilization – introducing amounts of iron into the ocean. However, this technique may not be practical at a large scale. Ocean oxygen depletion and resultant methane production (caused by the excess production remineralising at depth) is one potential drawback.

=== Great Calcite Belt ===
Yearly cycle of the Great Calcite Belt in the Southern Ocean. The belt appears during the southern hemisphere summer as a light teal stripe.

The Great Calcite Belt is a region in the Southern Ocean characterized by high concentrations of coccolithophores, a type of calcite-producing phytoplankton. It plays a significant role in ocean biogeochemistry and the global carbon cycle. Coccolithophores in the belt produce calcium carbonate (calcite or chalk) plates called coccoliths. This process, known as calcification, affects the ocean's carbon cycle by lowering alkalinity and releasing CO_{2}. However, when coccolithophores die, their calcite shells sink, contributing to the biological pump by transporting carbon to the deep ocean, sequestering it for centuries or longer and mitigating atmospheric CO_{2} levels.

=== Oxygen production ===
Phytoplankton absorb energy from the Sun and nutrients from the water to produce their own nourishment or energy. In the process of photosynthesis, phytoplankton release molecular oxygen (O_{2}) into the water as a waste byproduct. It is estimated that about 50% of the world's oxygen is produced via phytoplankton photosynthesis. The rest is produced via photosynthesis on land by plants. Furthermore, phytoplankton photosynthesis has controlled the atmospheric CO_{2}/O_{2} balance since the early Precambrian Eon.

=== Absorption efficiency ===
The absorption efficiency (AE) of plankton is the proportion of food absorbed by the plankton that determines how available the consumed organic materials are in meeting the required physiological demands. Depending on the feeding rate and prey composition, variations in absorption efficiency may lead to variations in fecal pellet production, and thus regulates how much organic material is recycled back to the marine environment. Low feeding rates typically lead to high absorption efficiency and small, dense pellets, while high feeding rates typically lead to low absorption efficiency and larger pellets with more organic content. Another contributing factor to dissolved organic matter (DOM) release is respiration rate. Physical factors such as oxygen availability, pH, and light conditions may affect overall oxygen consumption and how much carbon is loss from zooplankton in the form of respired CO_{2}. The relative sizes of zooplankton and prey also mediate how much carbon is released via sloppy feeding. Smaller prey are ingested whole, whereas larger prey may be fed on more "sloppily", that is more biomatter is released through inefficient consumption. There is also evidence that diet composition can impact nutrient release, with carnivorous diets releasing more dissolved organic carbon (DOC) and ammonium than omnivorous diets.

== Biomass variability ==
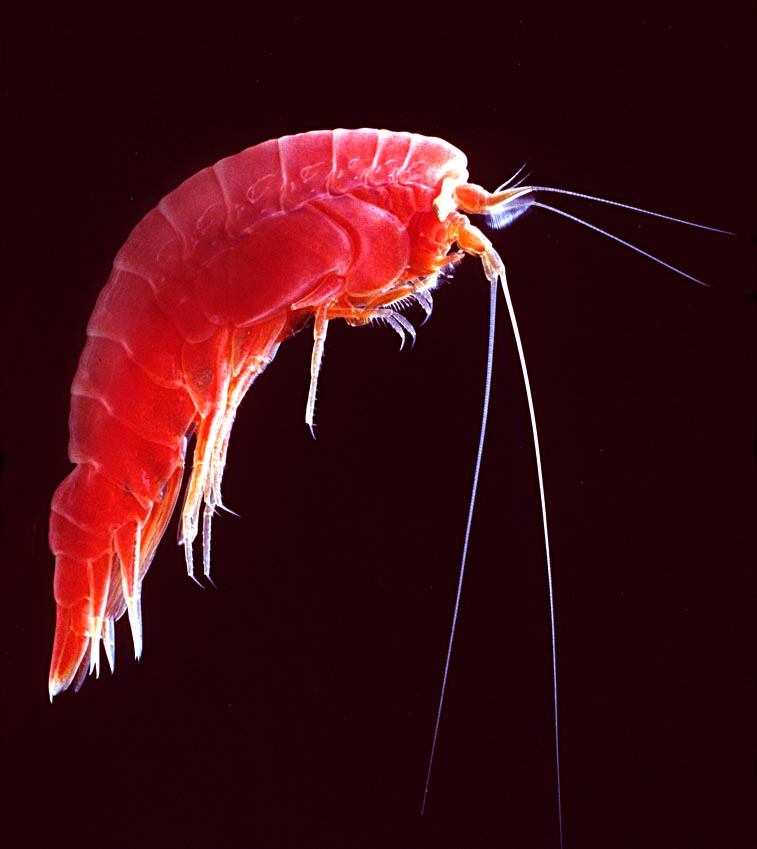
Amphipod with curved exoskeleton and two long and two short antennae

The growth of phytoplankton populations is dependent on light levels and nutrient availability. The chief factor limiting growth varies from region to region in the world's oceans. On a broad scale, growth of phytoplankton in the oligotrophic tropical and subtropical gyres is generally limited by nutrient supply, while light often limits phytoplankton growth in subarctic gyres. Environmental variability at multiple scales influences the nutrient and light available for phytoplankton, and as these organisms form the base of the marine food web, this variability in phytoplankton growth influences higher trophic levels. For example, at interannual scales phytoplankton levels temporarily plummet during El Niño periods, influencing populations of zooplankton, fishes, sea birds, and marine mammals.

The effects of anthropogenic warming on the global population of phytoplankton is an area of active research. Changes in the vertical stratification of the water column, the rate of temperature-dependent biological reactions, and the atmospheric supply of nutrients are expected to have important impacts on future phytoplankton productivity. Additionally, changes in the mortality of phytoplankton due to rates of zooplankton grazing may be significant.

== Planktonic relationships ==
=== Fish and plankton ===
Zooplankton are the initial prey item for almost all fish larvae as they switch from their yolk sacs to external feeding. Fish rely on the density and distribution of zooplankton to match that of new larvae, which can otherwise starve. Natural factors (e.g., current variations, temperature changes) and man-made factors (e.g. river dams, ocean acidification, rising temperatures) can strongly affect zooplankton populations, which can in turn strongly affect fish larval survival, and therefore breeding success.

It has been shown that plankton can be patchy in marine environments where there aren't significant fish populations and additionally, where fish are abundant, zooplankton dynamics are influenced by the fish predation rate in their environment. Depending on the predation rate, they could express regular or chaotic behavior.

A negative effect that fish larvae can have on planktonic algal blooms is that the larvae will prolong the blooming event by diminishing available zooplankton numbers; this in turn permits excessive phytoplankton growth allowing the bloom to flourish .

The importance of both phytoplankton and zooplankton is also well-recognized in extensive and semi-intensive pond fish farming. Plankton population-based pond management strategies for fish rearing have been practiced by traditional fish farmers for decades, illustrating the importance of plankton even in man-made environments.

=== Whales and plankton ===
Of all animal fecal matter, it is whale feces that is the 'trophy' in terms of increasing nutrient availability. Phytoplankton are the powerhouse of open ocean primary production and they can acquire many nutrients from whale feces. In the marine food web, phytoplankton are at the base of the food web and are consumed by zooplankton & krill, which are preyed upon by larger and larger marine organisms, including whales, so it can be said that whale feces fuels the entire food web.

=== Humans and plankton ===
Plankton have many direct and indirect effects on humans.

Around 70% of the oxygen in the atmosphere is produced in the oceans from phytoplankton performing photosynthesis, meaning that the majority of the oxygen available for humans and other organisms that respire aerobically is produced by plankton.

Plankton also make up the base of the marine food web, providing food for all the trophic levels above. Recent studies have analyzed the marine food web to see if the system runs on a top-down or bottom-up approach. Essentially, this research is focused on understanding whether changes in the food web are driven by nutrients at the bottom of the food web or predators at the top. The general conclusion is that the bottom-up approach seemed to be more predictive of food web behavior. This indicates that plankton have more sway in determining the success of the primary consumer species that prey on them than do the secondary consumers that prey on the primary consumers.

In some cases, plankton act as an intermediate host for deadly parasites in humans. One such case is that of cholera, an infection caused by several pathogenic strains of Vibrio cholerae. These species have been shown to have a symbiotic relationship with chitinous zooplankton species like copepods. These bacteria benefit not only from the food provided by the chiton from the zooplankton, but also from the protection from acidic environments. Once the copepods have been ingested by a human host, the chitinous exterior protects the bacteria from the stomach acids in the stomach and proceed to the intestines. Once there, the bacteria bind with the surface of the small intestine and the host will start developing symptoms, including extreme diarrhea, within five days.

== Plankton Manifesto ==
In 2024, the United Nations Global Compact's Ocean Stewardship Coalition launched the Plankton Manifesto, collaboratively developed by over 30 international experts. It outlines strategic recommendations to guide global efforts at safeguarding plankton and harnessing their potential to address planetary climate change issues, as well as pollution and biodiversity loss. It emphasizes plankton's critical role as the foundation of marine ecosystems, producing about 50% of Earth's oxygen and sequestering 30–50 billion metric tonnes of carbon annually.

Key recommendations include:

- Enhanced research and monitoring: Leveraging technologies like DNA sequencing, bioinformatics, satellite monitoring, and AI image analysis to improve understanding of plankton dynamics and create a global plankton atlas.
- Plankton-based solutions: Promoting innovative applications, such as using plankton for water purification, bioplastics, fertilizers, and animal feed to support sustainable industries.
- Policy integration: Urging governments, United Nations agencies, and businesses to include plankton in climate and biodiversity frameworks, with endorsements sought at COP29, COP16, and the 2025 United Nations Ocean Conference.
- Public awareness: Fostering "plankton literacy" through education and interdisciplinary initiatives to highlight their role in food security and ecosystem health.
- Collaboration: Encouraging cross-sectoral partnerships among academia, industry, and governments to fund research and protect plankton from threats like nutrient pollution and ocean warming.

== See also ==
- Paradox of the plankton
- Seston
- Veliger
