= Mycoloop =

Trophic pathway in aquatic food webs

The mycoloop is a trophic pathway in aquatic food webs where parasitic fungi, particularly chytrids, facilitate the transfer of nutrients and energy from large, inedible phytoplankton (algae) to zooplankton. This process enhances nutrient cycling and supports higher trophic levels in aquatic ecosystems.

Chytrids infect large, inedible phytoplankton, such as diatoms or cyanobacteria, and produce zoospores (free-living, motile spores, 2–5 μm in diameter). These zoospores are rich in nutrients like polyunsaturated fatty acids (PUFAs) and cholesterol, making them an excellent food source for zooplankton, such as Daphnia and rotifers. By consuming the zoospores or fragmented phytoplankton, zooplankton gain access to nutrients that would otherwise be unavailable from inedible phytoplankton, creating the trophic link called the mycoloop. In this manner, the mycoloop channels carbon, phosphorus, and other nutrients from phytoplankton to zooplankton, bypassing the limitations of inedible phytoplankton.

The mycoloop can influence phytoplankton blooms by reducing host populations (via parasitism) and supporting zooplankton growth, potentially stabilizing aquatic food webs. It can also influence the carbon cycle by altering carbon fluxes, reducing the sinking of large phytoplankton and redirecting carbon to higher trophic levels.

The concept of the mycoloop was developed by Maiko Kagami et al. in 2007. The term "mycoloop" combines myco (referring to fungi, specifically chytrids) with loop (referring to the cycle of nutrient transfer). The discovery of the mycoloop, and its potential impact on nutrient cycling indicates the importance of fungal-algal interactions in natural systems. Chytrids have also been reported to stabilize food webs, while also reducing the amount of organic material that reaches benthic environments.

== Background ==
Most food web studies do not incorporate what is perhaps the most common trophic interaction - parasitism. Despite their ubiquity, parasites are often overlooked because of their cryptic nature, the difficulties in quantifying their effects, and their assumed low biomass. However, they can account for greater biomass than predators and participate in the majority of trophic links. Parasites can modulate trophic flows in a number of ways. They can drive reductions in host biomass, not only by increasing host mortality rates, but also by influencing growth, fecundity, nutritional status, susceptibility to predation, or behaviour. While their role as consumers is better known, parasites can also be prey for other organisms. They can be consumed together with their host (i.e. concomitant predation) or as free living life stages. Given the enormous reproductive output of parasites, free living infecting stages potentially constitute a significant nutrient source and can account for a substantial transfer of material and energy to higher trophic levels.

Chytrids are a type of microscopic fungi belonging to the phylum Chytridiomycota. These fungi are primarily aquatic or found in moist environments. Chytrids can be saprophytic (decomposing organic matter), parasitic (infecting plants, algae, or animals), or mutualistic, and play key ecological roles in breaking down organic material and nutrient cycling. Notably, the chytrid Batrachochytrium dendrobatidis causes chytridiomycosis, a deadly disease in amphibians, contributing to global population declines. They are unusual among fungi in that they reproduce with motile spores, driven by flagella, called zoospores. Most chytrids do not sexually reproduce. Asexual reproduction occurs through the release of zoospores.

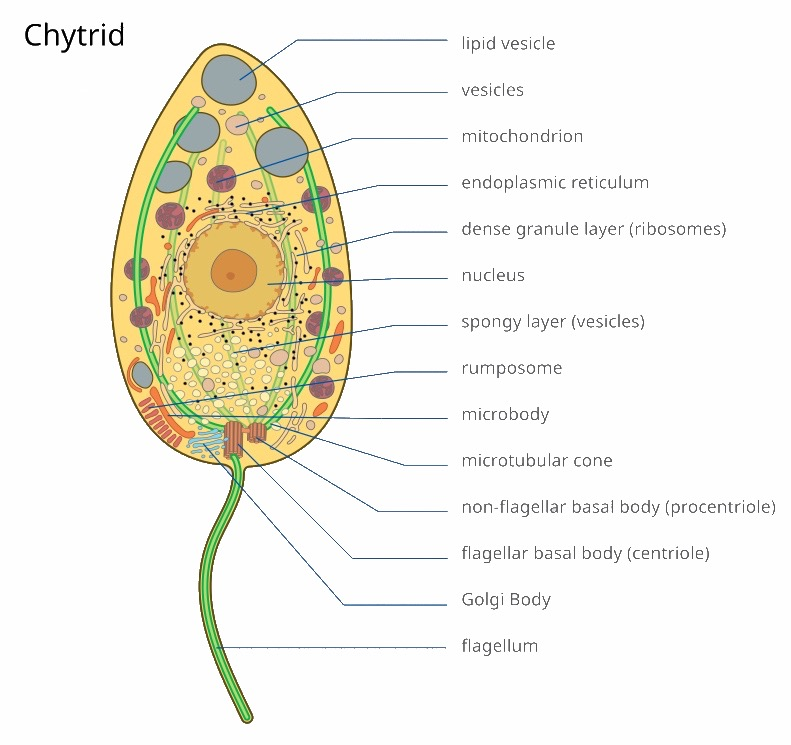

Chytrid zoospores are tiny fungal spores which in the ocean can have densities up to a billion per litre. They are rich in nutrients making them excellent food sources for zooplankton.

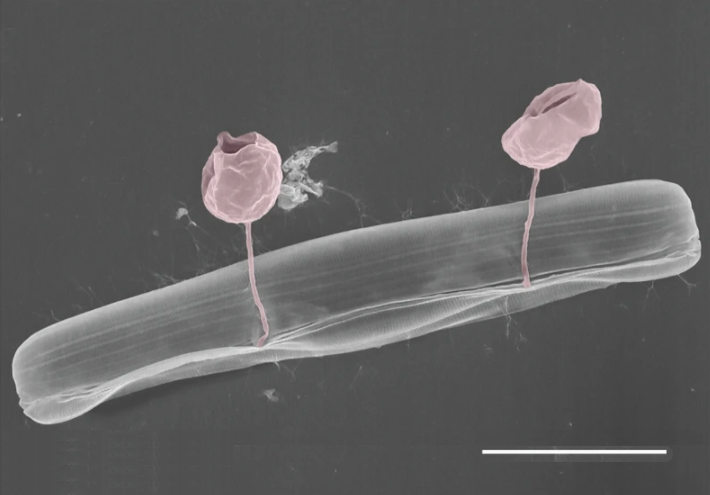
Pennate diatom from an Arctic meltpond, infected with two chytrid-like zoosporangium fungal pathogens (in false-colour red). Scale bar = 10 μm.

Saprotrophic chytrids decompose inedible organic matter releasing zoospores that zooplankton consume, further contributing to nutrient cycling. Zooplankton grazing on zoospores may suppress chytrid outbreaks, regulating parasite populations. The mycoloop can stabilise ecosystem by alleviating competition among phytoplankton and supporting zooplankton production, especially in nutrient-rich environments.

Studies show chytrid zoospores, which can have densities up to a billion spores per litre, are a high-quality food source, doubling zooplankton feeding rates compared to uninfected phytoplankton. The mycoloop is significant both in freshwater lakes and marine environments, with chytrids like Zygorhizidium facilitating nutrient transfer from algae like Asterionella to zooplankton like Daphnia.

Parasitic fungi derive nutrients from living hosts, often causing harm. However, fungi have many other ecological roles they can play apart from being parasitic. For example, they can be mycorrhizal (forming mutualistic relationships with plants), endophytic (living inside plants without causing harm), lichenized (forming symbiotic relationships with algae or cyanobacteria), or saprotrophic (breaking down dead organic matter). Some fungi even switch roles depending on environmental conditions or host availability.

Examples of zooplankton – grazers of the phytoplankton

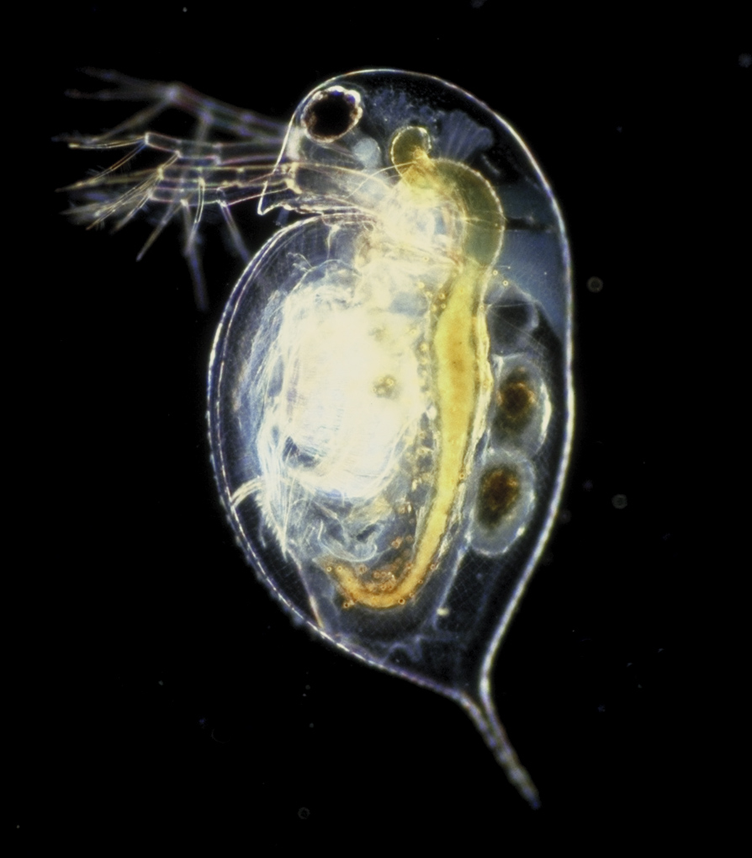
Daphnia pulex, a water flea typically 0.2–3.0 mm long

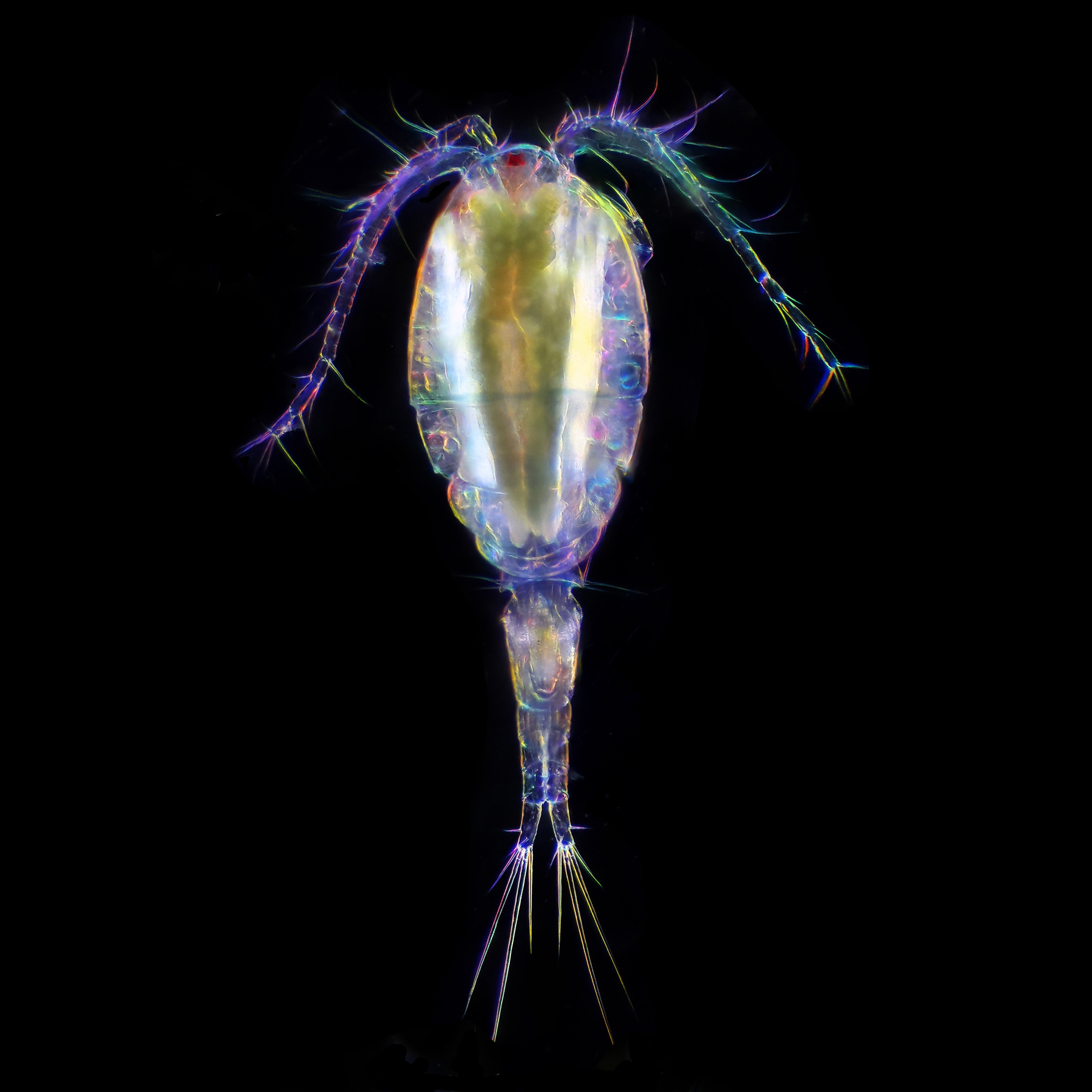
Over 10,000 marine species are copepods, small, often microscopic crustaceans

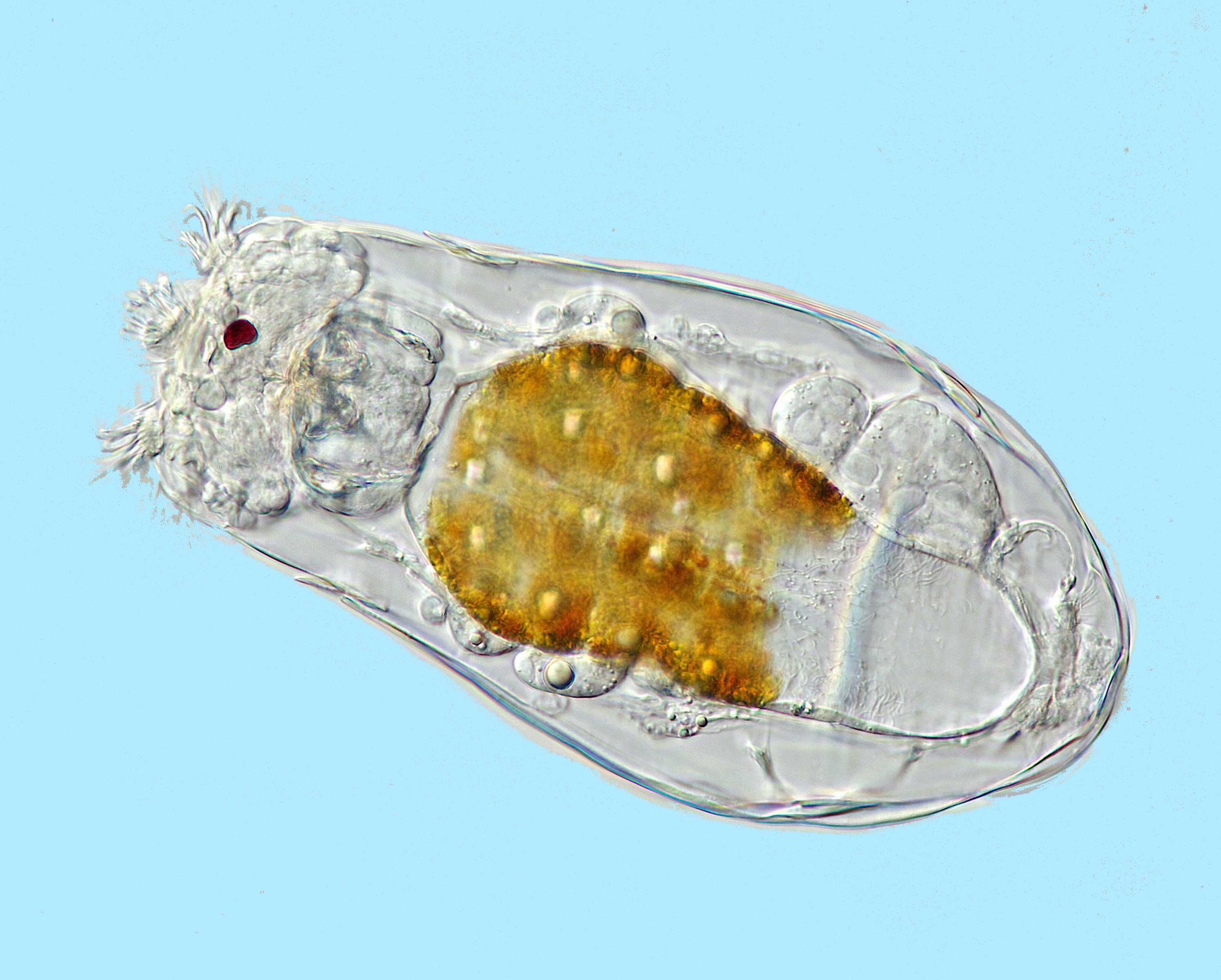
Rotifers, usually 0.1–0.5 mm long, may look like protists but are multicellular microanimals

=== Mycoplankton ===
Mycoplankton are saprotrophic or parasitic members of the plankton communities of marine and freshwater ecosystems. They are composed of filamentous free-living fungi and yeasts that are associated with planktonic particles or phytoplankton. Similar to bacterioplankton, these aquatic fungi play a significant role in heterotrophic mineralization and nutrient cycling. Mycoplankton can be up to 20 mm in diameter and over 50 mm in length, though mostly they are microscopic. A typical litre of seawater contains between one- and ten-million fungal cells. The number is greater in coastal ecosystems and estuaries due to nutritional runoff from terrestrial communities.

Aquatic fungi are found in a myriad of ecosystems, from mangroves, to wetlands, to the open ocean. The greatest diversity and number of species of mycoplankton is found in surface waters (< 1000 m), and the vertical profile depends on the abundance of phytoplankton. Furthermore, this difference in distribution may vary between seasons due to nutrient availability. Aquatic fungi survive in a constant oxygen deficient environment, and therefore depend on oxygen diffusion by turbulence and oxygen generated by photosynthetic organisms.

Aquatic fungi consist mostly of tiny mycoplankton (microfungi), yeast, or mobile zoospores, that can recycle organic matter through the mycoloop process, which involving parasiting plankton. Instead of directly building biomass, decomposers break organic nutrients down into inorganic forms which can be recycled (an approach which metabolically can be costly).

== Mycoloop dynamics ==
Parasitic chytrids can transfer material from large inedible phytoplankton to zooplankton. Chytrids zoospores are excellent food for zooplankton in terms of size (2–5 μm in diameter), shape, nutritional quality (rich in polyunsaturated fatty acids and cholesterols). Large colonies of host phytoplankton may also be fragmented by chytrid infections and become edible to zooplankton.

Parasitic fungi, as well as saprotrophic fungi, directly assimilate phytoplankton organic carbon. By releasing zoospores, the fungi bridge the trophic linkage to zooplankton, known as the mycoloop. By modifying the particulate and dissolved organic carbon, they can affect bacteria and the microbial loop. These processes may modify marine snow chemical composition and the subsequent functioning of the biological carbon pump.

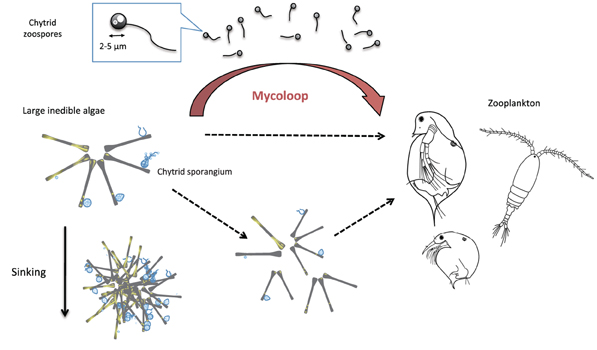
Diagram of a mycoloop (fungus loop) Parasitic chytrids can transfer material from large inedible phytoplankton to zooplankton. Chytrids zoospores are excellent food for zooplankton in terms of size (2–5 μm in diameter), shape, nutritional quality (rich in polyunsaturated fatty acids and cholesterols). Large colonies of host phytoplankton may also be fragmented by chytrid infections and become edible to zooplankton.

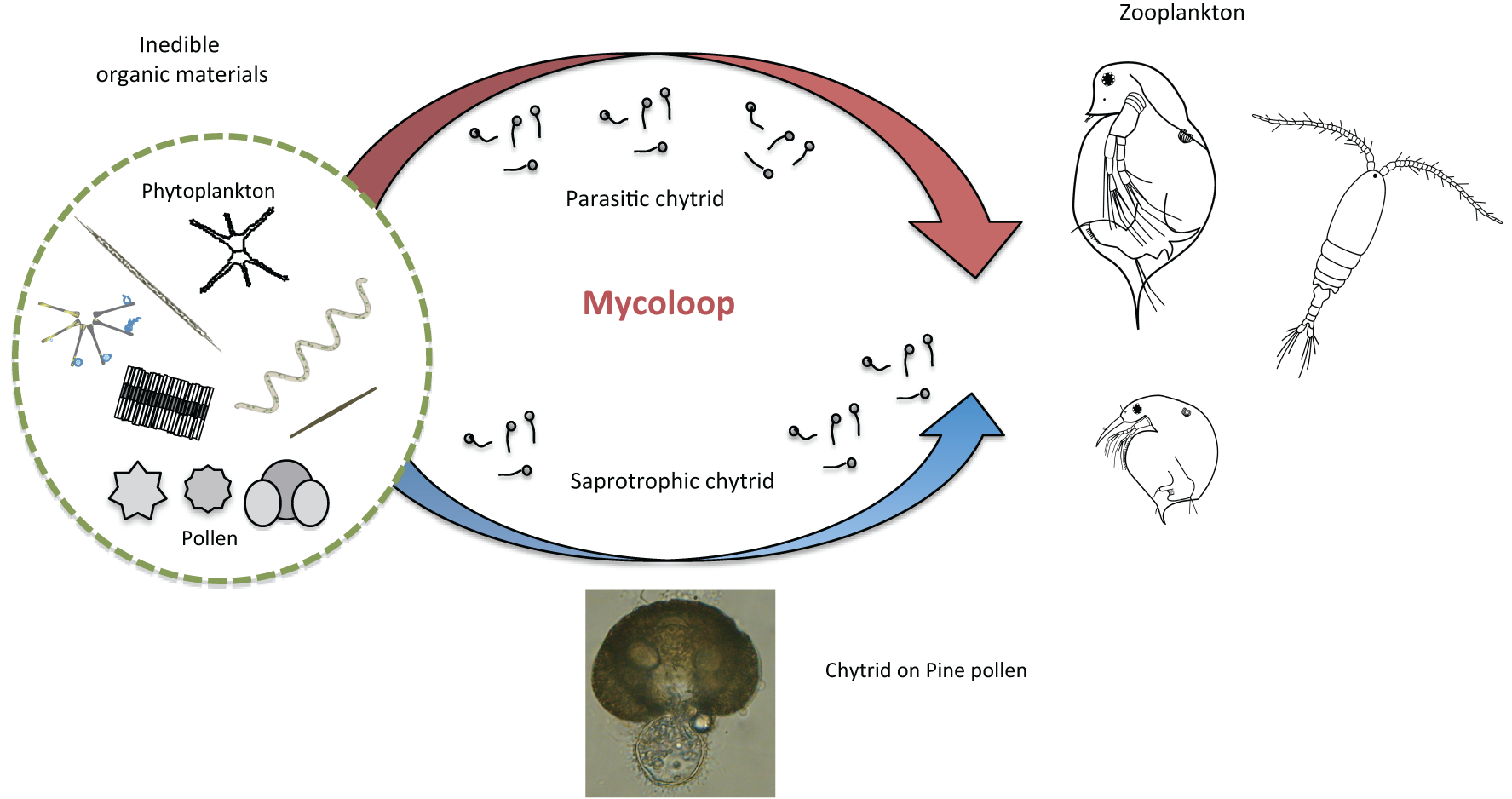
Possible other mycoloops in aquatic environments Saprotrophic chytrids may also play important roles in aquatic food webs, by decomposing inedible organic material such as pollens. Zoospores released from pollen may be consumed by zooplankton, functioning as another "mycoloop." In addition to chytrids, other zoosporic fungi or fungal-like protists, such as Cryptomycota and Labyrinthulomycota, can infect phytoplankton or consume large inedible organic material, which may be grazed by zooplankton in freshwater and marine environments.

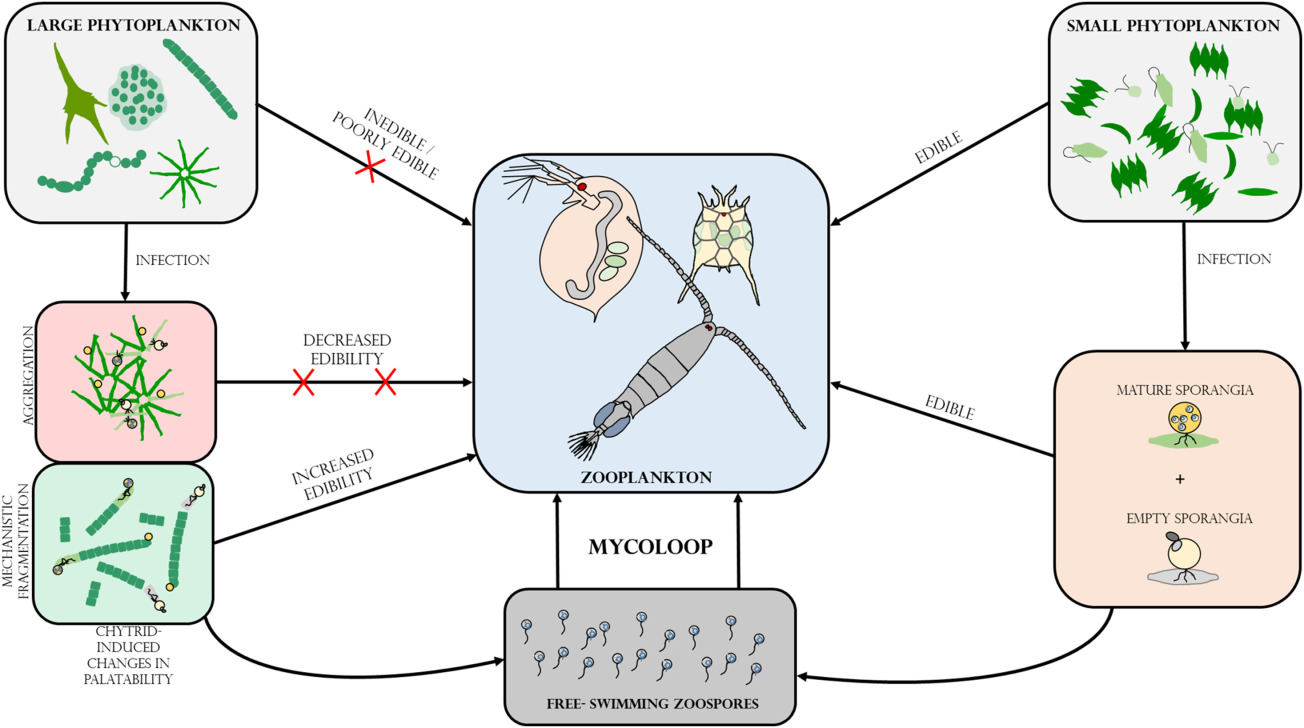
Mycoloop links between phytoplankton and zooplankton Chytrid‐mediated trophic links between phytoplankton and zooplankton (mycoloop). While small phytoplankton species can be grazed upon by zooplankton, large phytoplankton species constitute poorly edible or even inedible prey. Chytrid infections on large phytoplankton can induce changes in palatability, as a result of host aggregation (reduced edibility) or mechanistic fragmentation of cells or filaments (increased palatability). First, chytrid parasites extract and repack nutrients and energy from their hosts in form of readily edible zoospores. Second, infected and fragmented hosts including attached sporangia can also be ingested by grazers (i.e. concomitant predation).

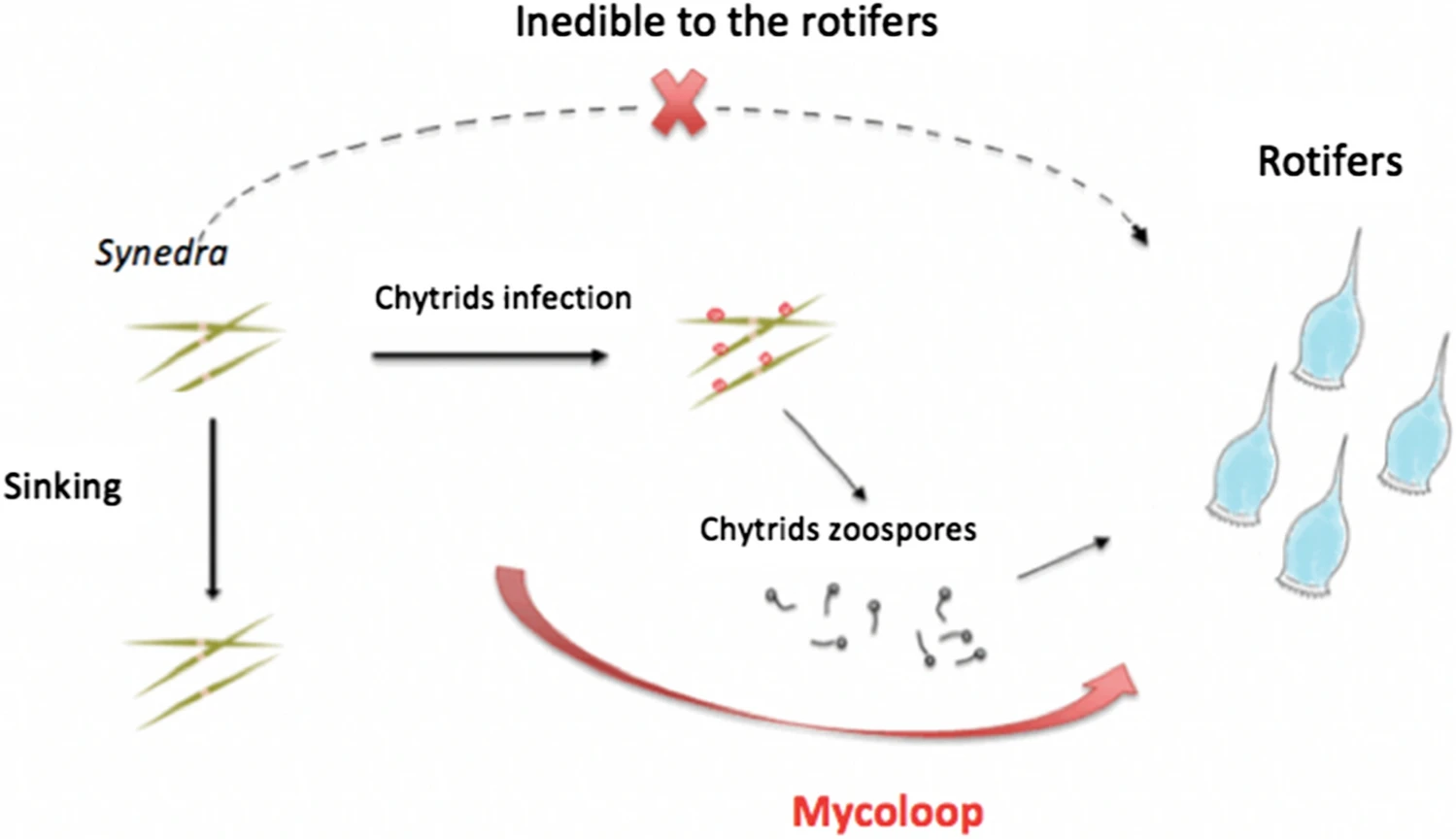
Mycoloop with diatom and rotifer The food web system includes the inedible diatom (Synedra), the obligate parasitic consumer of the diatom (chytrid) with a sessile (sporangium) and a motile (zoospore) life stage, and the rotifer (Keratella), which can consume the chytrid zoospores but not the host diatom. While Synedra is inedible to Keratella, its nutrients may still be transferred to the rotifer via infection propagules (zoospores).

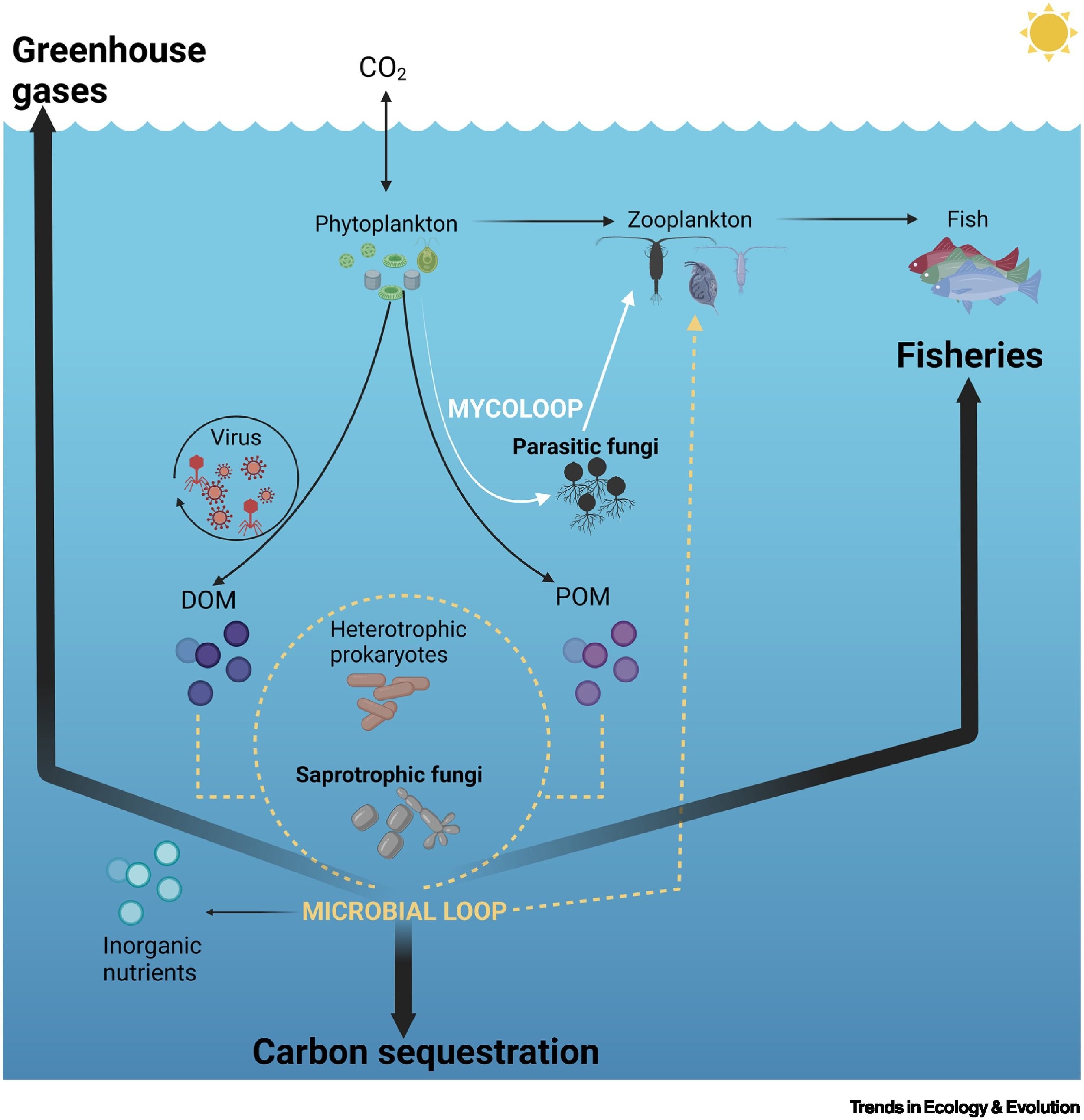
The central role played by pelagic fungi, both parasitic and saprotrophic in the mycoloop, and saprotrophic fungi as active contributors to the microbial loop. The activity of heterotrophic microbes, including pelagic fungi, has far-reaching global implications for fisheries (i.e., the amount of carbon that will ultimately flow to higher trophic levels) and climate change (i.e., the amount of carbon that will be sequestered in the ocean or respired back to CO_{2} and the release of other greenhouse gases; e.g., N_{2}O.

[

== Parasites and food webs ==
Parasites are rarely included in food web studies, although they can strongly alter trophic interactions. In aquatic ecosystems, poorly grazed cyanobacteria often dominate phytoplankton communities, leading to the decoupling of primary and secondary production. Advances in food web theory and modelling have contributed to understanding of the network of feeding relationships in ecological communities. Still, they often fail to explain processes observed in natural systems. One reason for this is that most food web studies do not incorporate what is perhaps the most common trophic interaction - parasitism. Despite their ubiquity, parasites are usually overlooked because of their cryptic nature, the difficulties in quantifying their effects, and their assumed low biomass. However, they can account for greater biomass than predators and participate in the majority of trophic links. Parasites can modulate trophic flows in a number of ways. They can drive reductions in host biomass, not only by increasing host mortality rates, but also by influencing growth, fecundity, nutritional status, susceptibility to predation, or behaviour. While their role as consumers is better known, parasites can also be prey for other organisms. They can be consumed together with their host (i.e. concomitant predation) or as free living life stages. Given the enormous reproductive output of parasites, free living infecting stages potentially constitute a significant nutrient source and can account for a substantial transfer of material and energy to higher trophic levels.

The efficiency of energy and material entry into the food web is largely determined by the trophic coupling between primary and secondary production. In aquatic pelagic ecosystems, primary production is often dominated by cyanobacteria. Promoted by eutrophication and global warming cyanobacteria often develop into blooms that severely disrupt ecosystem functioning and raise health concerns due to the production of diverse toxins Cyanobacteria display high resistance to grazing, which often leads to the decoupling of primary and secondary production and inefficient carbon transfer to zooplankton. The inability of zooplankton to exert effective top-down control on cyanobacterial populations has traditionally been linked to the poor edibility of cyanobacteria with colonial or filamentous morphologies, the production of toxic metabolites, and their low nutritional value.

== Relation to the microbial carbon pump ==
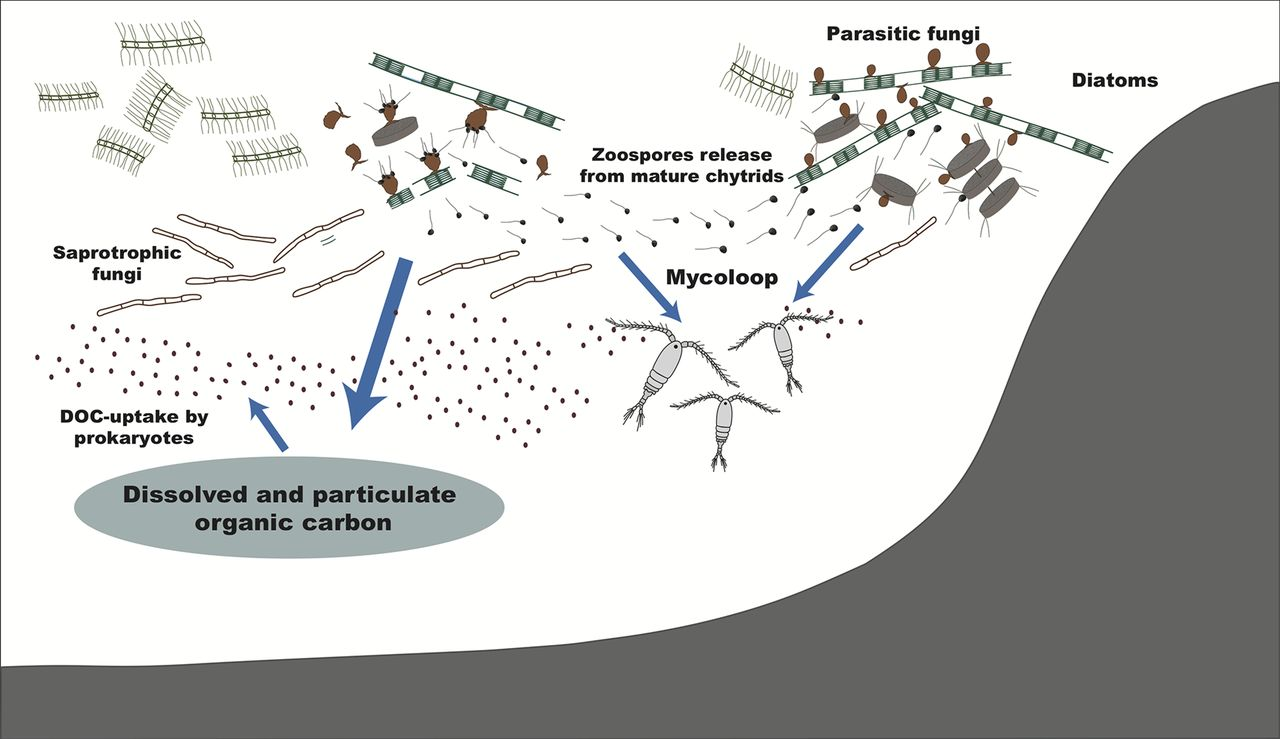
Roles of fungi in the marine carbon cycle Roles of fungi in the marine carbon cycle by processing phytoplankton-derived organic matter. Parasitic fungi, as well as saprotrophic fungi, directly assimilate phytoplankton organic carbon. By releasing zoospores, the fungi bridge the trophic linkage to zooplankton, known as the mycoloop. By modifying the particulate and dissolved organic carbon, they can affect bacteria and the microbial loop. These processes may modify marine snow chemical composition and the subsequent functioning of the biological carbon pump.

Marine microorganisms make up around 70% of the total marine biomass and are involved in complex functional and phylogenetic networks with all three organismal domains of life and viruses. They harbor a set of genes responsible for driving major redox reactions that are crucial for controlling the remineralization of organic material. Most of the research on the role of microbes in the oceanic nutrient cycling has focused on prokaryotes. Little is known on the role of pelagic fungi in the cycling of organic matter in the ocean despite fungi being recognized as key elements in remineralizing nutrients and degrading organic matter in the terrestrial and freshwater environment. However, recent studies revealed that pelagic fungi were found to dominate the microbial biomass in deep-sea marine snow and exhibited biomass concentrations similar to that of prokaryotes during phytoplankton blooms. Moreover, by infecting inedible phytoplankton, parasitic fungi are suggested to act as trophic bridge via the fungal shunt by producing zoospores that are consumed by zooplankton, a process defined as the "mycoloop".

Recent evidence also indicates that pelagic fungi play a potentially important role in the marine carbon cycle. A global-ocean scale multiomics study reported a widespread and active role of fungi in degrading carbohydrates by studying the diversity and expression of carbohydrate-active enzymes phylogenetically affiliated to fungi.

While the microbial carbon pump focuses on microbes transforming dissolved organic carbon (DOC) into refractory forms for long-term carbon sequestration in the deep ocean, the mycoloop is a food web process that transfers carbon and nutrients to higher trophic levels in surface waters. Both processes involve microbes (bacteria in microbial carbon pump, fungi in mycoloop) and contribute to carbon cycling, but the mycoloop emphasizes trophic interactions rather than long-term storage.
