= Microbial carbon pump =

The microbial carbon pump (MCP) is a biological process in the ocean where microorganisms, primarily bacteria and archaea, transform dissolved organic carbon (DOC) into refractory dissolved organic carbon (RDOC), which is resistant to further microbial degradation. This process effectively sequesters carbon in the deep ocean for centuries to millennia, contributing significantly to long-term carbon storage and climate regulation.

Microbes metabolize labile (easily degradable) DOC from phytoplankton or other sources, producing RDOC as a byproduct. RDOC is chemically stable and persists in the ocean, resisting breakdown. This contrasts with the biological carbon pump, which sequesters carbon via sinking particulate organic matter (e.g., dead organisms or fecal pellets). The microbial carbon pump locks away carbon in the form of RDOC, which can remain in the deep ocean for thousands of years, reducing atmospheric carbon dioxide levels over long timescales. Estimates suggest RDOC accounts for a significant portion of the ocean's ~700 billion tons of dissolved organic carbon, making the microbial carbon pump a critical component of the global carbon cycle.

Diverse microbial communities, including bacteria like Prochlorococcus and Pelagibacter, drive the microbial carbon pump by transforming organic matter through metabolic processes. Environmental factors (e.g., nutrient availability, temperature) influence the efficiency of RDOC production. The microbial carbon pump helps regulate Earth's climate by storing carbon that would otherwise contribute to atmospheric carbon dioxide. It's particularly relevant in the context of climate change, as changes in ocean conditions (e.g., warming, acidification) could affect microbial activity and RDOC production.

Bacteria mainly drive the pump

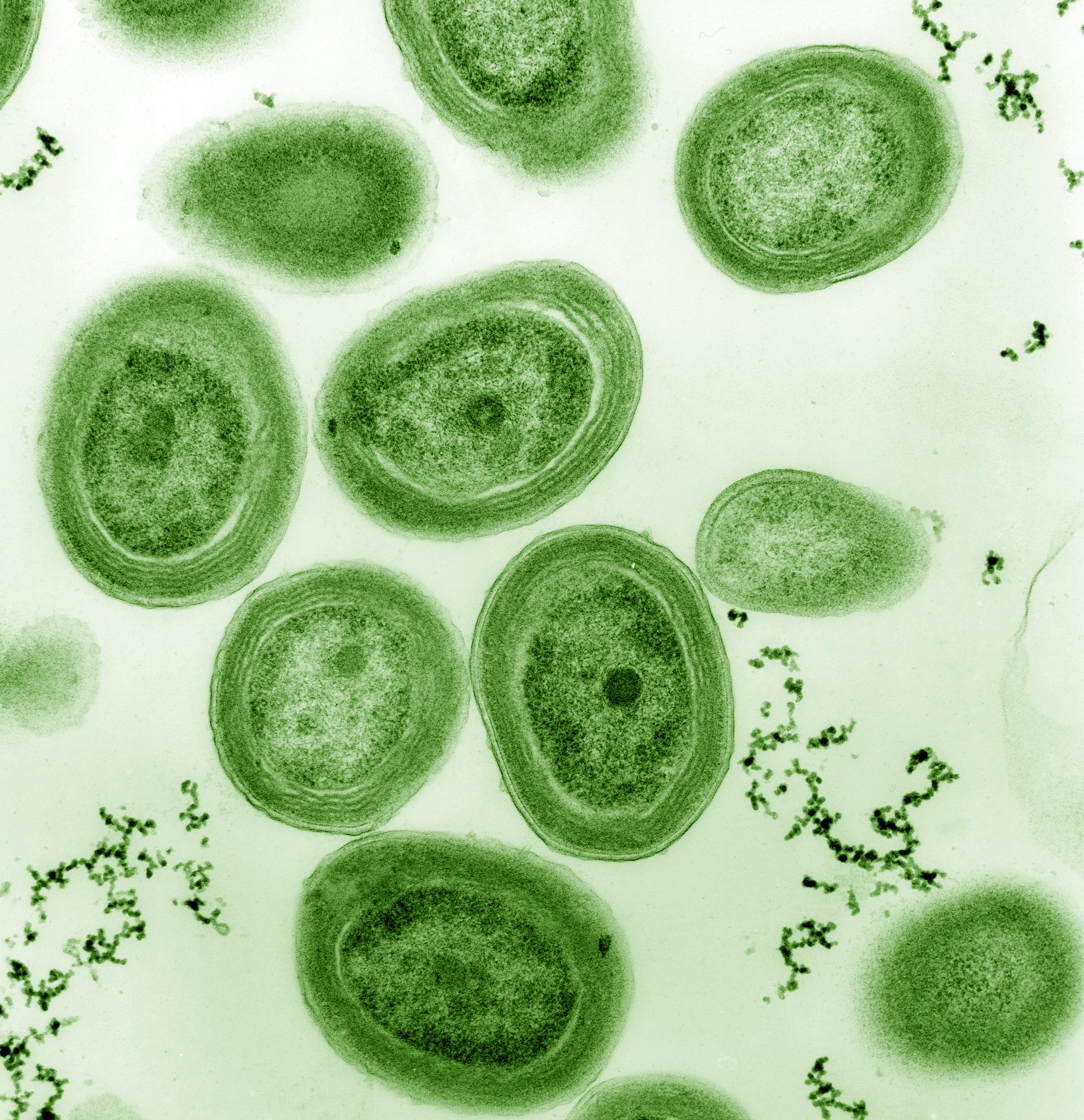
The cyanobacterium Prochlorococcus, the smallest photosynthetic organism in the world.

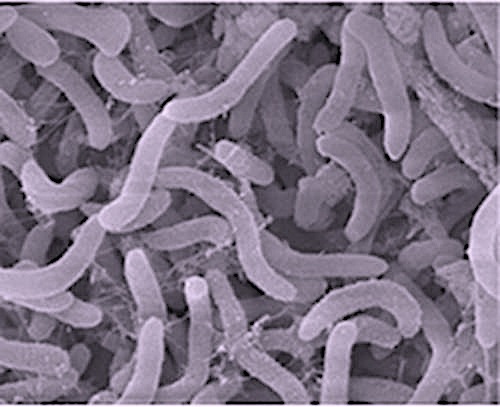
Pelagibacter ubique, the most common bacteria in the ocean, plays a major role in the global carbon cycle

== Background theory of formation ==
In past traditional frameworks for ocean carbon sequestration the biological carbon pump (BCP) describes the mechanism in which carbon dioxide is converted to organic carbon by marine primary producers in surface waters and is subsequently transferred to depth as particulate and/or dissolved organic carbon (POC/DOC). While a small fraction of the organic carbon taken in by these microorganisms is transported to the deep ocean and ultimately buried in marine sediments, the model fails to account for the large portion of DOC that is remineralized back into carbon dioxide and stays present throughout the water column.

Although the BCP process represents a realistic path for short-term carbon exportation to the deep, it does not account for the persistence of this substantial reservoir of DOC that constitutes approximately 95% of the total organic carbon in the ocean. This represents the discrepancy in the carbon pump models used; that despite the high efficiency of heterotrophic microorganisms in consuming organic substrates, a large fraction of DOC still remains in the ocean for millennia. Because traditional models are based on the physical export of carbon moving from the surface to the depths, they are insufficient to explain the long-term stability and accumulation of this carbon pool present in the ocean.

=== Early conceptual developments ===
Before the introduction of the microbial carbon pump (MCP) theory for carbon sequestration, there were several other mechanisms used to describe organic matter cycling and transformation in the ocean. The microbial loop emphasized the role of bacteria and archaea in recycling dissolved organic matter (DOM) within the surface ocean, thereby retaining carbon and nutrients to the euphotic zone. Viral shunting described a process by which viral lysis of microbial cells converts particulate organic matter (POM) into dissolved forms (DOM), which prevents nutrient transfer to larger organisms and instead recycles carbon within the microbial communities. These processes improve understanding of short-term carbon cycling, but they do not fully resolve the mechanisms of the underlying long-term DOC persistence. Any organic carbon in the water column is hypothesized to eventually be taken up by surrounding organisms and vertically transported to the sediments through sinking particles.

To provide a clear understanding of the MCP mechanisms, DOM subcategories were made based on bioavailability and turnover times. Labile DOM (LDOM) is rapidly utilized (minutes to days) by surrounding microorganisms and is typically found in surface waters in the form of smaller simple molecules, while semi-labile DOM (SLDOM) persists for months to years before degradation, as it is made up of complex, nitrogen-rich substances. The turnover time is defined by how easily the carbon molecule is either taken up or broken down by surrounding organisms, which indicates why the speed of incorporation by an organism directly relates to the chemical complexity of the substance. The presence of recalcitrant DOM (RDOM) refers to highly complex carbon compounds that are distributed throughout the entire water column and are resistant to microbial utilization allowing long-term persistence with residence times ranging from centuries to millennia. The origin and maintenance of this recalcitrant pool remained an unresolved question in ocean carbon cycling that could not be concluded with the microbial loop and other biochemical carbon pumps, which only observed the direct movement of the carbon and not its chemical makeup.

The concept of the MCP (microbial carbon pump) was introduced to address this gap. It was proposed that microorganisms in the ocean actively transform labile organic carbon into recalcitrant forms (RDOM) that are able to remain in the water persistently over long timescales. This completely changes the way that ocean carbon sequestration is viewed. The biological carbon pump focuses solely on the physical movement of sinking particulate matter, while the MCP evaluates the organic carbon's biochemical makeup that allows it to be retained in the ocean without vertical export. Looking at it this way, the MCP is not referring to a single pathway for carbon storage, but to a whole network of biological processes that spans the whole water column on numerous different scales. These systems work together in tandem to move atmospheric carbon into the ocean sediments below. At the molecular level, microorganisms transform simple compounds such as amino acids and sugars into complex and structurally diverse molecules that resist further degradation. At the cellular level, membrane transport systems, including ATP binding cassette (ABC) transporters, regulate the uptake and release of the organic substrates that will influence the DOC composition in surrounding waters. Looking at the community/ecosystem levels, interactions among the microbial populations govern the production, transformation and persistence of organic matter, ultimately determining its fate in the ocean.

The conclusion of these proposed mechanisms were reached from evaluations of marine bacteria that were capable of producing RDOM directly from labile substrates. In subsequent studies, the microbial metabolites were noted to directly relate to the complex carbon molecules associated with long-term carbon cycling in the ocean, reinforcing the role of microbial processes in shaping the composition and continuance of DOC. It is together that these developments established the microbial carbon pump as a biochemical explanation for the accumulation of recalcitrant carbon in the ocean.

=== Evidence and distinction of MCP from BCP ===
The major distinction between the MCP and other proposed pumps (biological carbon pump (BCP), carbonate counter pump (CCP), solubility carbon pump (SCP), etc.), is that it is built on an entirely different conceptual understanding in both its mechanism and criteria for carbon burial. In these carbon pumps, carbon sequestration is determined by the physical presence of the carbon moving from the surface waters to be deposited in sedimentation. In particular the BCP is a combination of the photosynthetic process of carbon fixation in the shallow waters and the exportation of this POM to the deep through simple gravitational sinking. The efficiency of this process can be directly based on the efficiency of what carbon molecules from the surface are able to be transported below the depth of rapid remineralization. Using this logic, carbon sequestration can only occur in lower depths of the ocean and in sediments leaving the whole pump largely ineffectual even though the uptake of carbon from microorganism is highly utilized. In contrast to this, the MCP does not rely of sinking rates of particles but rather emphasizes the chemical transformation of the organic matter into more resistant carbon molecules that will persistently exist throughout the water column. Therefore this pump is more defined by its heterotrophic microbial processing instead of particle export. To then determine overall efficiency, the study of the molecular makeup and reactivity of the carbon compounds are highly important compared to their vertical location in the water column. This mechanism challenges the original assumptions of the BCP, that depth is not indicative of carbon storage and biological productivity does not necessarily correspond to regions of efficient long-term sequestration. Many core understandings about carbon cycling in the ocean and how it can be studied were changed with the introduction of this carbon pump theory. While highly productive systems are still considered to enhance vertical carbon export through the BCP, areas such as oligotrophic environments can also substantially contribute to carbon sequestration through the gradual accumulation of RDOM. By decoupling carbon storage from nutrient-driven primary production, our overall understanding of elemental cycling, including carbon-to-nitrogen and carbon-to-phosphorus ratios in DOM pools is altered.

The evidence released supporting the microbial carbon pump theory shows the inner workings of the microbial community on several different scales. The main incubation experiments were able to show microorganisms transforming a fraction of labile substrates into persistent dissolved compounds that accumulated into RDOM pools over time. Looking from an ecosystem level through mesocosm analysis, it was observed that RDOM produced from labile precursors exhibited chemical signatures that were consistent with those observed in the deep ocean reservoirs. In further molecular research, identification of varying persistence of DOM molecules such as, carboxyl-rich alicyclic molecules (CRAM), nitrogen-containing compounds, D-amino acids and lipopolysaccharides, could be attributed to microbial production and transformation mechanisms. Genetic studies expanded into the large diversity of microbial taxa and differing metabolic pathways involved in organic matter processing to paint the picture of the MCP network. This range of microbiota contributes to the chemical heterogeneity of RDOM. Gene sequencing was used in classifying differences in specialized enzymes that help with biosynthesis and degradation, both key components in regulating the persistence of these carbon pools. But despite these key discoveries, the importance of the BCP to the MCP is still yet to be quantified as both provide bountiful information regarding carbon cycling. Theories about the BCP can be directly measured through particle flux and sedimentation rates which often makes this process considered the dominant mechanisms for short-term carbon export. As the MCP operates at a much slower transformation rate, this process can be difficult to measure directly or reproduce in lab studies. Researchers conclude that the microbial carbon pump most likely significantly contributes to long-term carbon storage due to the large pool size and longevity of the RDOM itself.

While the MCP would provide a mechanistic understanding of carbon sequestration, it has also face critical evaluation. Alternative explanations for long timescales of DOC emphasize that there may be other ecological or kinetic constraints preventing biological uptake other than chemical stability. The dilution hypothesis proposes that many organic compounds most likely just exist at too low of concentrations for microorganisms to efficiently uptake, giving DOM an appearance of resistance. In this instance, the long lasting life of RDOM can be explained specifically because of the metabolic efficiency or low biological encounter rates. Overall the global effect of the MCP-driven carbon sequestration remains hard to quantify with a lack of large-scale measurements that requires further study.

== Important mechanisms ==
Overview of the marine carbon cycle, highlighting the Microbial Carbon Pump (MCP) and its role in generating Recalcitrant Dissolved Organic Carbon (RDOC). The diagram displays how microbial activity and the viral loop process organic matter into long-term storage pools.

One of the core mechanisms of the microbial carbon pump (MCP) is that microorganisms convert labile dissolved organic matter (labile DOM) into dissolved organic matter that is more resistant to further decomposition through metabolism and reprocessing. Ogawa et al. (2001) show that natural marine bacterial assemblages consumed labile substrates such as glucose and glutamate and produced refractory DOM in a short period of time that persisted for more than a year. The study reports that only about 10–15% of the bacterially derived DOM can be identified as hydrolyzable amino acids and sugars, and most of it remained uncharacterized at the molecular level. Its bulk properties are consistent with those of marine DOM. These findings show microbial processing can alter the molecular structure of DOM, making it more resistant to further degradation.

Another important mechanism is related to the molecular diversity and structural complexity of dissolved organic matter. Lechtenfeld et al. (2015) use bioassays and ultrahigh-resolution molecular analysis to demonstrate that marine bacteria produce exometabolites with high molecular diversity after utilizing simple organic substrates. The study indicates that bacterially derived DOM shares similarities with natural seawater DOM in terms of chemical composition and structural complexity, and that an appreciable portion of these molecules exhibit molecular and structural characteristics consistent with marine refractory molecules. Furthermore, the study also notes that bacterially derived DOM contains carboxyl-rich alicyclic molecules (CRAM), which are believed to be associated with oceanic refractory DOM. These results indicate that microbial metabolism not only consumes DOM but also generates dissolved organic molecules with higher structural complexity and potential persistence.

In addition, it is necessary to clarify why some DOM is more bioavailable, while others are more persistent. Labile DOM is more readily utilized by microorganisms because it typically consists of smaller compounds with simpler chemical structures, which can be taken up more quickly and incorporated into metabolic pathways. However, during the utilization of these substrates, microorganisms do not simply completely mineralize DOM. They release metabolites with greater molecular diversity and structural complexity, some of which are similar in character to refractory DOM in the ocean. Furthermore, the long-term persistence of DOM depends on the properties of the molecules themselves and also on their concentration, energy returns, and whether the surrounding microbial communities possess the corresponding metabolic capabilities. When environmental or ecological conditions change, even compounds that appear refractory on the surface may be further removed. Therefore, these mechanisms help explain how microbial processing can contribute to the persistence of DOM under certain environmental conditions.

Lastly, Zakem et al. (2021) suggest that the accumulation of organic matter cannot be explained by molecular recalcitrance alone, but is determined by a combination of biochemical properties, microbial community composition, and environmental conditions. The authors further suggest a recalcitrance indicator to describe the likelihood of a specific DOM pool being consumed under different environmental conditions. Therefore, the persistence of DOM is regarded as a context-dependent property rather than an intrinsic molecular characteristic.

== Interactions with nitrogen and sulphur cycles ==
The microbial carbon pump (MCP) is not a separate mechanism of carbon sequestration but naturally related to other biogeochemical cycles in the marine ecosystem. The microorganisms involved in the microbial carbon pump are naturally associated with nutrient cycles. There is a strong coupling in these biogeochemical cycles, in which nutrient availability is a factor in carbon sequestration in the ocean. Consequently, in marine systems, the conversion of dissolved organic carbon (DOC) into recalcitrant dissolved organic carbon (RDOC) is not simply a microbiologically mediated process; rather, it is naturally related to nutrient availability in the system. This is a strong indicator of the fact that the efficiency of carbon sequestration in the ocean is naturally a coupled process of interactions between carbon and nutrient cycles rather than a process of carbon sequestration alone. Consequently, there is a strong necessity to understand the microbial carbon pump as a coupled system in which microbial activity is naturally a factor in organic matter transformation as well as nutrient cycling in the water column.

Nitrogen cycling is a significant aspect in controlling MCP processes, especially with regard to its effects on microbial growth and metabolism. Nitrogen fixation, nitrification, and denitrification are significant processes in controlling the bioavailability of nitrogen, which in turn affects microbial productivity and utilization of organic materials. When there is a surplus of nitrogen, microbes are capable of rapidly utilizing labile DOC, which favors recycling over long-term storage. However, under conditions where there is a scarcity of nitrogen, microbes are capable of producing more complex and less biodegradable compounds, which favors RDOC formation. This indicates that nitrogen availability not only affects the rate of carbon turnover but also affects its chemical composition, especially with regard to its utilization in microbial processes.

Similarly, the sulphur cycle also affects the MCP because it supplies alternative forms of energy to microbes for metabolism, thereby affecting carbon transformation. Compounds such as dimethylsulfoniopropionate, a sulphur-containing compound, act as a significant substrate for microbes in the ocean, facilitating their metabolic processes, thereby affecting carbon degradation and synthesis. The metabolism of sulphur-containing compounds affects the composition of dissolved organic matter, thereby affecting the persistence of carbon in the ocean. This affects the formation of RDOC, thereby affecting the efficiency of the MCP in carbon sequestration.

== Viral shunting in relation to MCP ==
Viral shunting can be regarded as a significant mechanism that plays a vital role in the microbial carbon pump (MCP) by helping to control the flow of organic carbon. During viral infections of marine bacteria and archaea, the cell lysis caused by viruses releases the contents of the cell directly into the dissolved organic matter. The mechanism of viral shunting can thus be regarded as a means of converting particulate organic carbon into dissolved organic carbon, thus promoting the availability of substrates for microbial metabolism. Instead of promoting the flow of carbon to higher trophic levels, viral shunting promotes the flow of carbon to microorganisms, thus emphasizing the importance of microorganisms in carbon cycling. In this way, viruses can thus play a role in the initiation of MCP mechanisms by promoting the flow of organic carbon.

In this regard, viral shunting in the microbial loop is a critical process in the recycling of carbon in surface waters, where a quick turnover of organic material is encouraged. By retaining this carbon in microbial communities, there is a reduction in the flux of carbon to higher trophic levels, with a consequent increase in microbial turnover. The continued uptake and metabolism of virus-derived DOM by heterotrophic microbes leads to a biochemical modification of organic material, with simple and readily available compounds changing to complex and structurally heterogeneous compounds over successive cycles of microbial metabolism. This process directly follows the mechanisms of the MCP, where microbial metabolism leads to RDOC, which is resistant to further metabolism.

Additionally, the role of viral shunting is to augment the MCP function by enhancing the size and molecular diversity of the DOM pool accessible for transformation into RDOC. As the molecular diversity is elevated by the lysis of the viruses, the probability of the compounds accumulating the chemical attributes of persistence is elevated. This is particularly true in environments with oligotrophic conditions, which are nutrient-limited environments with high rates of recycling. As the recycling is continually being fueled by the supply of DOM, the significance of the role played by the viral shunting is to ensure the processes for the long-term retention of the carbon in the oceans. As such, the role played by the viral processes in the context of microbial metabolism can be seen as an example of the MCP functioning as part of a larger ecological scheme.

== Ocean warming and climate change ==
Currently, climate change poses a serious threat to the efficiency of the Microbial Carbon Pump. As ocean temperatures rise, this triggers an acceleration of microbial metabolic rates through the process of the Arrhenius effect (see Arrhenius equation for further information). Such drastic modifications to microbial respiration turns refractory carbon back into CO_{2} as the increase in thermal energy allows extracellular enzymes to overcome activation barriers previously required to break down complex organic rings and chains. With this lowered activation energy, the additional carbon gets converted into CO_{2} instead of being used to build new microbial biomass.

For instance, geological records indicate that the ocean’s MCP can transition into a defensive mechanism during periods of increasing CO_{2} concentrations. During periods of warming, instead of creating new biomass or contributing to building RDOC needed for sequestration, microorganisms are forced into survival mode by diverting their available carbon towards respiratory maintenance and cellular repair.

This metabolic strain is further intensified due to ocean acidification, a process that acts as a chemical stressor on marine organisms. This biological stress often forces various marine life to divert their energy away from cellular growth and maintenance and instead shift it towards survival. Despite these physiological burdens, the MCP may respond in three ways: by channeling more fixed carbon into the DOC pool, shifting primary production towards dissolved matter in nutrient-poor waters, or restructuring microbial communities that dictate the ocean’s overall carbon storage system. While further research is needed to understand the effects of these proposed mechanisms, the net effect on the DOC pool is not uniformed. For instance, phytoplankton that produce calcium carbonate shells may suffer from lower growth rates, yet the overall primary production may remain unaffected as many groups are not currently limited by the CO_{2} levels. This variability exists as some communities are naturally adapted to pH shifts, while in others, the excess carbon is effectively cleared through microbial activity. While the chemical composition of the ocean is indeed changing, studies indicate that higher CO_{2} levels would result in the increase of DOC concentrations.

Beyond the changes in metabolic processes, rising temperatures also significantly alter the diversity of the microbial communities present within the various depths of the ocean. Typically, warming ocean waters events select for smaller, oligotrophic cells, such as Prochlorococcus, over larger, nutrient-hungry organisms, such as diatoms. Given that these organisms possess smaller surface-to-volume ratios, the quality of the pump’s output changes where the resulting DOC may lack the complex structural components required to form long-term RDOC. As a result, the microbial community would produce an unstable pool of organic matter that is easily recycled in the upper regions of the ocean compared to deeper depths.

Shifting from a microscopic lens, global simulations conducted by Chust, G. et al found that beyond an acceleration of individual metabolic rates, rising ocean temperatures fundamentally reshaped the diversity and distribution of marine life across various depths. Based on global climate models, the enhancement of stratification resulted in the decline of primary production by 9% due to the impacts of the efficiency of the carbon pump. Since warming increases ocean stratification, it creates a physical barrier that prevents the mixing of nutrients and traps heat in the surface layers, which further stresses out microbial populations. Additionally, ocean stratification depletes the chromophoric dissolved organic matter (CDOM) pool. These layering events act as a double barrier where it traps accumulating DOC in the ocean’s upper layers while hindering CDOM vertical transportation from deeper depths to the surface. With this upward transport being blocked, such structural changes in CDOM production diminish due to decreased net primary production and a strengthening thermocline. Through this intensified layering process, the surface mixed layer gets “compressed” , which confines the remaining CDOM to a shallow, hot zone where it gets exposed to extreme UV radiation. Ultimately, this results in photodegradation, which further accelerates the bleaching of CDOM and reduces an essential component of the ocean’s carbon storage system.

== See also ==
- Biological pump
- Microbial loop
- Mycoloop
- Viral shunt
- Ocean stratification
