= Neocalanus cristatus =

Scientific classification
- Domain: Eukaryota
- Kingdom: Animalia
- Phylum: Arthropoda
- Class: Copepoda
- Order: Calanoida
- Family: Calanidae
- Genus: Neocalanus
- Species: N. cristatus

Binomial name
- Neocalanus cristatus (Krøyer, 1848)

Synonyms
- Calanus cristatus Krøyer, 1848

Species of crustacean

Neocalanus cristatus is a species of copepod found primarily in the northern Pacific.

== Description ==
The female usually ranges in length from about 7.6 to 10.4 millimetres (0.30 to 0.41 in). The male usually is between about 6.7 and 9.6 millimetres (0.26 and 0.38 in) in length.

== Distribution ==
Neocalanus cristatus is found in the northern Pacific and, in lesser numbers, in the Chukchi Sea and the Arctic Sea. It has also been recorded off of the coast of Chile.

== Ecology ==
=== Life cycle and reproduction ===
Although N. cristatus breeds year round, it peaks in terms of reproductive activity from October to December. Breeding occurs at depth; at Station P, adults reproduce at depths below 250 metres (820 ft). At Site H, off of the east coast of Hokkaido, adults reproduce at depths below 500 metres (1,600 ft). Here, adults are usually located from about 500 to 1,500 metres (1,600 to 4,900 ft) in depth. After being spawned, the nauplii ascend to the surface. During this ascent, they develop into stage VI nauplii or stage I copepodites. According to studies in a laboratory with water at 2 °C (36 °F), it takes about 40 days for this development to happen. The nauplii feed off of their large yolk during their growth. Stage I through IV copepodites are found in the top 250 metres (820 ft) of depth. During a period of the year, stage I through IV copepodites may be found from the thermocline to between about 200 and 250 metres (660 and 820 ft); in some areas, this is correlated with high temperatures near the surface. It takes about four months to develop from a stage I to a stage V copepodite. Stage V copepodites migrate below 250 metres (820 ft) of depth in July and August and enter diapause, emerging as adults after September. Overall, the life cycle of N. cristatus is annual, like the rest of its genus.
