= Neocalanus plumchrus =

Scientific classification
- Kingdom: Animalia
- Phylum: Arthropoda
- Clade: Pancrustacea
- Class: Copepoda
- Order: Calanoida
- Family: Calanidae
- Genus: Neocalanus
- Species: N. plumchrus

Binomial name
- Neocalanus plumchrus (Marukawa, 1921)

Synonyms
- Calanus plumchrus Marukawa, 1921; Calanus tonsus plumchrus Fulton, 1968

Species of crustacean

Neocalanus plumchrus is a large species of copepod found in the Pacific and Arctic Oceans. It was described in 1921 H. by Marukawa. N. flemingeri was formerly considered as conspecific, likely as a form, until it was split in 1988 by Charles B. Miller.

== Taxonomy and etymology ==
Neocalanus plumchrus was originally described by Marukawa in 1921. It was eventually moved by Janet Bradford and John Jillett in 1974 from the genus Calanus to its current placement in Neocalanus. The species N. flemingeri was split out of this species in 1988, where it is considered by Charles B. Miller to have been placed as f. typica.

== Description ==
Neocalanus plumchrus is considered a large copepod, with females generally ranging from about 4 to 6.3 millimetres (0.16 to 0.25 in) in length. The males are usually between about 4.2 and 5 millimetres (0.17 and 0.20 in) in length. Stage V copepodites usually are more than 4.3 millimetres (0.17 in) in length. The females of N. plumchrus, contrasting to those of N. flemingeri, have convex first urosomal tagma. The cephalosome length to prosome length ratio is generally over 0.44. The spermatophore deposited in females lacks any coils. In males, the ratio of cephalosome length to prosome length is usually between 0.55 and 0.56. The first antenna extends beyond the caudal rami by multiple segments. In stage V copepodites, the colouration and the second from medial caudal seta (or II bristle) can be used to distinguish this species and N. flemingeri. In N. plumchrus, there is red-orange colouration along both of the first antennae, vertical stripes of colour along the sides of the thorax, and on the caudal rami. The II bristle is about 0.28 millimetres (0.011 in) in diameter 0.5 millimetres (0.020 in) from its base, and is over three times the length of the urosome when the former is in its entirety.

== Distribution ==
In the Pacific, N. plumchrus is found in the Sea of Japan, the northern Pacific, and off California. It is also found in the Arctic Ocean.

== Ecology ==
=== Life cycle and reproduction ===
The timing of reproduction in N. plumchrus is variable; in the Strait of Georgia, it breeds between December and April, whereas it breeds between July and February at Station P. In both cases, it breeds at depth, usually below around 300 metres (980 ft) in the former, and below about 250 metres (820 ft) in the latter case. It likely utilizes lipid stores to breed, instead of recently consumed food. After reproducing, the adults die; first the males, and then the females. Copepodite stages I through V develop in the surface waters (stages II through IV are found in the top 250 metres (820 ft) throughout the year in waters off Japan, for example) late during the phytoplankton bloom. Stage V copepodites enter diapause at depths of below 250 metres (820 ft) during late summer. At Station P, the number of copepodites in diapause remains about the same until September, when numbers decrease due to mortality and development into adults. This contrasts to the Strait of Georgia, where diapause is from July to January, and maturation occurs during January and February.

=== Feeding ===
Neocalanus plumchrus is, as a whole, omnivorous, although there are regional variations. In the Strait of Georgia, for example, this copepod is mainly herbivorous, whereas in the ocean, omnivory is more prevalent; this affects the composition of lipids, with oceanic samples having (likely as an adaptation to lower concentrations of food) more monounsaturated fats with 20 or 22 carbon atoms. It is able to uptake glucose directly from seawater from its dermal glands and midgut, which arthropods were thought to be incapable of due to their rigid exoskeleton.
