= Mycoplankton =

Fungal members of the plankton communities of aquatic ecosystems

Mycoplankton are saprotrophic or parasitic members of the plankton communities of marine and freshwater ecosystems. They are composed of filamentous free-living fungi and yeasts that are associated with planktonic particles or phytoplankton. Similar to bacterioplankton, these aquatic fungi play a significant role in heterotrophic mineralization and nutrient cycling. Mycoplankton can be up to 20 mm in diameter and over 50 mm in length.

In a typical milliliter of seawater, there are approximately 10^{3} to 10^{4} fungal cells. This number is greater in coastal ecosystems and estuaries due to nutritional runoff from terrestrial communities. Aquatic fungi are found in a myriad of ecosystems, from mangroves, to wetlands, to the open ocean. The greatest diversity and number of species of mycoplankton is found in surface waters (< 1000 m), and the vertical profile depends on the abundance of phytoplankton. Furthermore, this difference in distribution may vary between seasons due to nutrient availability. Aquatic fungi survive in a constant oxygen deficient environment, and therefore depend on oxygen diffusion by turbulence and oxygen generated by photosynthetic organisms.

== Classification ==
There is a large amount of diversity among aquatic fungi. These fungi were traditionally classified using the groupings "lower" and "higher" fungi.

This has frequently been replaced with using the more precise phyla names, with "higher" fungi now roughly corresponding to the Dikarya subkingdom, which has the majority of the mycoplankton

Genome sequencing is a common way to assess and categorize aquatic fungi. Fungi are Eukaryotes, and as such it is often the 18s rDNA which is sequenced.

According to fossil records, fungi date back to the late Proterozoic era, 900-570 million years ago. It is hypothesized that mycoplankton evolved from terrestrial fungi, likely in the Paleozoic era (390 million years ago). It is likely that the transition from terrestrial to aquatic lifestyle has occurred many different times, as many taxa have been found with both terrestrial and marine species.

== Biogeochemical contributions ==
There are multiple biogeochemical cycles in the Earth's oceans in which Mycoplankton play a role. They are a part of the microbial loop and other forms of nutrient cycling, including the mycoplankton specific mycoflux and mycoloop.

=== Cycling of organic nutrients ===
Mycoplankton, like all fungi, play an essential roll in the degradation of detritus and organic matter from plants, as well as other larger organisms. By working with other microbial communities, mycoplankton efficiently convert particulate organic matter to dissolved organic matter as part of biogeochemical cycling. Mycoplankton and heterotrophic bacteria mediate carbon, nitrogen, oxygen, and other nutrient fluxes in marine ecosystems. The incorporation of dissolved organic carbon into microbe biomass is what is known as the microbial loop.

Mycoplankton are often found in higher abundances near the surface, as well as in shallow waters. This is indicative of a connection between mycoplankton and the upwelling of organic matter. Phytoplankton communities are also abundant in the euphotic zone, which provides further evidence for the role of Mycoplankton in consumption of organic matter.

=== Mycoloop and mycoflux ===
Mycoplankton are important in controlling phytoplankton and zooplankton populations. The mycoloop is very similar to the microbial loop, as the basis of both is for microbes to make material accessible to organisms that occupy higher trophic levels. Through the mycoloop phytoplankton are transformed such that they are able to be grazed upon by zooplankton. This function is performed by parasitic marine fungi (mycoplankton).

The mycoflux is understudied, but believed to be a part of carbon capture in aquatic habitats. Functionally, this process involves aquatic fungi breaking down organic matter.

=== Benthic shunt ===
Another process which mycoplankton take part in is known as the benthic shunt. This process takes place in the benthic zone, the sediments at the bottom of the water. The benthic shunt is typically referred to in relation to freshwater aquatic environments, but the concept is relevant and takes place in marine habitats as well. The benthic shunt is basically energy and nutrient flow as directed by lower trophic level organisms, such as mycoplankton.

== Role in food webs ==
Due to their significant contributions to nutrient cycling, mycoplankton play a large role in regulation of food webs. Aquatic fungi such as mycoplankton degrade and convert organic matter into other forms. In a way, mycoplankton contributions to aquatic food webs are the biogeochemical services that they perform. The grazer food chain and the microbial food chain are inherently intertwined, as the dissolved organic carbon at the base of the microbial food chain originally comes from material excreted by grazers from the grazer food chain. Not only are the new forms of organic matter more palatable by macro plankton, but the process of conversion releases substrates which support bacterial growth. This in turn allows for the bacteria and macro plankton to support even higher trophic levels. This is a form of bottom-up control of aquatic food webs.

== Communities ==
While mycoplankton are found in a variety of aquatic environments, their distribution, abundance, and diversity vary throughout these environments. There is typically a greater amount of diversity and a larger abundance of mycoplankton in coastal waters, due to the extra availability of nutrients. There also exists variation in community composition and diversity at different depths. The control factors for the distribution of mycoplankton is thought to be variable.

== See also ==
- Algae – Diverse group of photosynthetic organisms
- Biological pump – Carbon capture process in oceans
- Marine fungi
