= Neocalanus =

Scientific classification
- Kingdom: Animalia
- Phylum: Arthropoda
- Class: Copepoda
- Order: Calanoida
- Family: Calanidae
- Genus: Neocalanus; Sars, 1925

Type species
- Neocalanus gracilis (Dana, 1852)

Genus of crustaceans

Neocalanus is a genus of marine copepods. They are a dominant component of the open water ecosystems of the northern Pacific Ocean. Neocalanus are large copepods, reaching body lengths (i.e., prosome length) of more than 8 mm (0.31 in) in Neocalanus plumchrus.

== Species ==
There are six species:

- Neocalanus cristatus (Krøyer, 1848)
- Neocalanus flemingeri Miller, 1988
- Neocalanus gracilis (Dana, 1852)
- Neocalanus plumchrus (Marukawa, 1921)
- Neocalanus robustior (Giesbrecht, 1888)
- Neocalanus tonsus (Brady, 1883)

== Life cycle ==
=== Neocalanus flemingeri ===
Neocalanus flemingeri is predominantly annual, with a significant fraction of biennials in some areas. The largest females reach prosome length of about 5 mm (0.20 in); males are smaller.

== Trophic interactions ==
Neocalanus are important food items for many predators, such as North Pacific right whale and least auklet.
