= Curtis A. Suttle =

Canadian microbiologist

Curtis A. Suttle is a Canadian microbiologist and oceanographer who is a faculty member at the University of British Columbia. Suttle is a Distinguished University Professor who holds appointments in Earth & Ocean Sciences, Botany, Microbiology & Immunology and the Institute for the Oceans and Fisheries and a Fellow of the Royal Society of Canada. On 29 December, 2021 he was named to the Order of Canada. His research is focused on the ecology of viruses in marine systems as well as other natural environments.

== Biography ==
Suttle completed both his bachelor's and doctoral degrees at the University of British Columbia. He worked in several positions at the State University of New York at Stony Brook from 1987 to 1988 before joining the faculty at the University of Texas at Austin's Marine Science Institute. In 1996, he returned to the University of British Columbia as a tenure-line faculty member, where he currently holds the rank of Professor and Distinguished University Scholar. Suttle was the Associate Dean for Research of the Faculty of Science from 2001 to 2013.

== Research ==
Suttle completed his doctoral studies under the guidance of Paul J. Harrison. Suttle's research focused on nitrogen and phosphorus as well as grazing effects on freshwater phytoplankton. He published his first paper on viruses in marine systems in 1990 – the paper was co-authored by Amy Chan and then graduate student Matt Cottrell and focused on the lysis of eukaryotic phytoplankton. Since then, he has published numerous paper on viruses infecting bacteria, phytoplankton and invertebrate grazers. In 1999, he co-authored the first paper to describe the viral shunt with his former postdoctoral fellow Steven Wilhelm. This work was awarded the John H Martin Award from the Association for the Sciences of Limnology and Oceanography (ASLO) in 2021, in recognition for the paper establishing the importance of viruses in biogeochemical cycles. Along with this work, he has contributed high-profile publications in the journals Nature, Science, and Nature Reviews Microbiology.

Suttle's interests continue to focus on viruses, and include the continued development of biomolecular tools to study virus diversity and function in natural systems. His lab (work led by graduate student Matthias Fisher) was the first to describe the Cafeteria roenbergensis virus. In 2019 his research team uncovered a series of viruses in endangered Pacific salmon populations.

== Awards and honors ==
He was elected as a Fellow of the Royal Society of Canada in 2008, appointed to The Order of Canada in 2021, received the A.G. Huntsman Award for Excellence in Marine Science in 2010, the Timothy R Parson Medal for Excellence in Ocean Sciences in 2011, and the G. Evelyn Hutchinson Award for excellence in limnology or oceanography. He was elected to the American Academy of Microbiology in 2014, and named a sustaining Fellow of ASLO in 2016.
