= Station P (ocean measurement site) =

Geographically located ocean measurement site

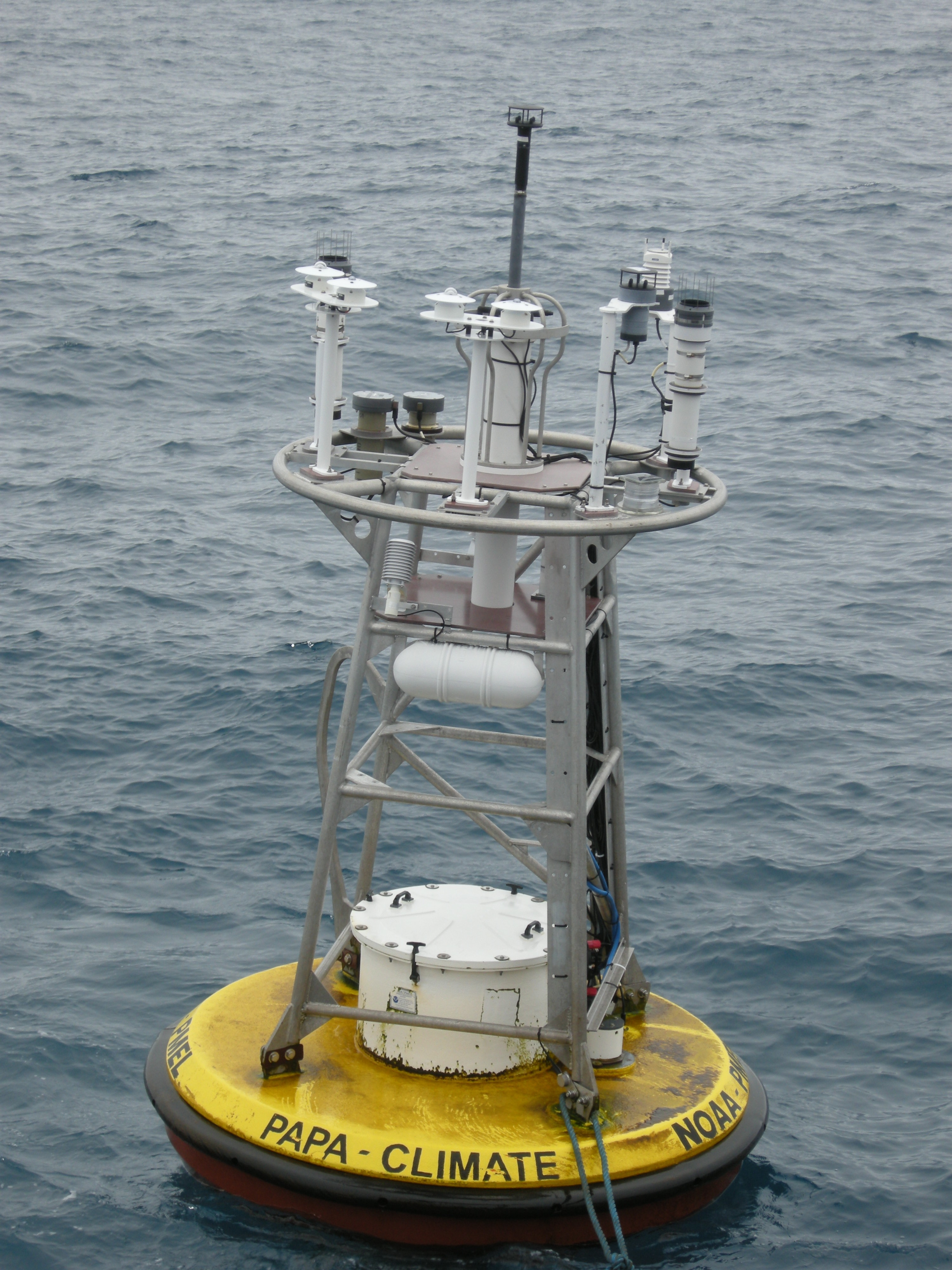
Ocean station P instrumentation buoy, as it appeared in 2009

Station P (also known as Ocean Station Papa or OSP) is a long-term oceanographic observatory located in the subarctic Northeast Pacific Ocean at coordinates 50°N, 145°W, at a water depth of 4,220 metres. First established in 1949, it is one of the longest continuously monitored ocean sites in the world, providing over six decades of data on temperature, salinity, dissolved oxygen, nutrients, and biological communities.

Station P is situated at the western terminus of Line P, a series of 26 oceanographic sampling stations extending from the continental shelf off Vancouver Island, British Columbia, to the open ocean at OSP. Research cruises are conducted three to six times per year by the Canadian Department of Fisheries and Oceans (DFO), and the station is located within a high-nutrient, low-chlorophyll (HNLC) region of the Alaska Gyre, where iron limitation constrains primary productivity.

Microbial communities at OSP vary strongly with depth and season, with bacterioplankton playing a central role in carbon cycling through dissolved organic matter (DOM) remineralization and contributions to the biological carbon pump and microbial carbon pump. Long-term records have documented ocean warming, freshening, and deoxygenation, and captured ecological impacts of major climate events such as the 2014-2015 marine heatwave known as the Blob.

== History ==
=== Establishment ===
Ocean Station Papa was first established on 19 December 1949 as part of an international network of ocean weather stations, originally operated by the United States Weather Bureau through the U.S. Coast Guard. The station's primary purpose was to provide meteorological data to support transatlantic aviation and maritime navigation. Canada assumed full operational responsibility in December 1950, after which two Canadian vessels, the St. Catharines and the Stonetown, maintained a continuous on-station presence by taking alternating six-week shifts.

In 1967, these vessels were replaced by larger ships better equipped for oceanographic measurements, including the CCGS Vancouver and CCGS Quadra, and later the Parizeau in 1974. The 32-year time series collected during the Ocean Weather Station Papa (OWSP) period provides baseline data against which modern oceanographic changes can be compared. With the advent of satellite-based weather monitoring, the crewed weather ship programme was discontinued and the final weather ship departed in August 1981.

=== Line P program ===
Following the end of the crewed weather ship era, regular oceanographic sampling was maintained through the Line P programme, coordinated by DFO. Line P runs approximately 1,500 kilometres from the continental shelf near Victoria, British Columbia, westward to Station P at 50°N, 145°W, comprising 26 sampling stations with OSP at the outermost end.

Since 1981, DFO has conducted three to six Line P research cruises per year aboard vessels such as the CCGS John P. Tully, collecting water column temperature and salinity profiles, macronutrient concentrations, dissolved oxygen, chlorophyll a, and primary production rates. The Line P dataset constitutes one of the few long-term open-ocean time series available for the subarctic North Pacific, making it indispensable for tracking decadal-scale changes in ocean chemistry and biology.

=== Methods of data collection ===
Data collection at Station P has historically relied on ship-based sampling using conductivity-temperature-depth (CTD) profilers, Niskin bottles for water sampling, and sediment traps to quantify sinking particle flux. From 1997 to 1999, a NOAA PMEL surface mooring was deployed as part of the National Ocean Partnership Program (NOPP), marking the beginning of autonomous year-round data collection. A permanent NOAA surface mooring was initiated in June 2007, providing continuous measurements of air-sea heat flux, wind speed, and ocean temperature between research cruises.

=== Technological advancement ===
Beginning in 2014, the National Science Foundation's Ocean Observatories Initiative (OOI) enhanced Station Papa with an array of subsurface moorings, making it one of four Global Nodes in the OOI network. More recent additions include Biogeochemical Argo floats, underwater gliders, and Passive Aquatic Listeners (PALs), together transforming Station Papa from a single fixed-point weather station into a multi-platform, interdisciplinary ocean observatory.

== Physical oceanography ==
Location and hydrography

Station P is located at 50°N, 145°W in the subarctic northeast Pacific Ocean, within the cyclonic circulation of the Alaska Gyre and at the western end of Line P, a transect extending from the continental shelf off British Columbia into the open subarctic Pacific.

Measurements of temperature, salinity, and dissolved oxygen have been collected through the water column at the site since 1956. The upper ocean varies strongly by season. In summer, two main density gradients are present: a seasonal pycnocline at about 30 m depth and a permanent pycnocline at about 120 m depth. The seasonal pycnocline forms mainly through summer heating, whereas the permanent pycnocline is associated largely with salinity stratification. In winter, surface cooling and storm-driven mixing weaken the seasonal pycnocline, leaving a mixed layer about 90 m deep above the permanent pycnocline.

The northeast subarctic pacific water columns are also shaped by low evaporation, high precipitation and freshwater runoff, which produces a shallow halocline. The winter mixed layer in the center of the gyre is typically 75–120 m in depth and at ocean station PAPA the upper ocean mixed layer varies seasonally from about 120m in winter to 40 m in summer. Seasonal changes are also seen in surface conditions, with average winds decreasing from 12 to 7 ms-1 and seawater temperatures increasing from about 6 °C to more than 12 °C in winter and summer. Declining salinity and a shallowing of the mid-winter mixed layer have also been reported over the second half of the twentieth century, where there is a decrease in surface salinity over time from water fown to about 100dbar in depth to the top of the permanent pycnolcine.

High-nutrient, low chlorophyll (HNLC) conditions

Ocean Station PAPA is located in the northeast subartic pacific, which is one of the world’s major high-nutrient, low chlorophyll (HNLC) regions. In this region surface waters are characterized by low and relatively constant chlorophyll a concentrations, high macronutrient concentrations year-round, and the dominance of small phytoplankton cells. Surface nitrate and silicic acid are not regularly depleted during summer, but instead decline to about half of levels measured in winter. Iron limitation is a major factor of phytoplankton growth in the region. Studies at Ocean Station Papa reported that iron availability limited phytoplankton growth and nitrate uptake in late spring and summer, while both iron availability and irradiance limited phytoplankton growth in winter. Offshore phytoplankton communities along Line P were also found to be iron-stressed, in contrast to transitional and coastal regions. Chlorophyll a concentrations at offshore stations along Line P were reported to be around 0.35 mg m⁻³ throughout the year, with relatively little seasonal and interannual variability. Offshore nitrate uptake remained low despite abundant nitrate, and new production contributed on average 32 ± 15% of total nitrogen uptake along Line P. Phytoplankton biomass and primary production at the main offshore stations were dominated by cells smaller than 5 μm, while larger cells made up a relatively small proportion of total biomass under typical conditions.

== Microbial communities ==
Community composition and structure

Microbial community composition at Ocean Station Papa has been examined across multiple seasons and depth zones using 16S rRNA gene amplicon sequencing. One multi-year study analyzed 271 samples collected between 2010 and 2016 from 16 depth intervals spanning surface to bottom waters, allowing comparisons of prokaryotic communities throughout the water column. Community structure at OSP varies strongly with both depth and season. In surface waters, the most common groups include Alphaproteobacteria, especially the SAR11 clade, as well as Gammaproteobacteria, Bacteroidetes, Cyanobacteria, and Actinobacteria. More detailed analyses have also identified abundant surface taxa such as SAR11 clades Ia, II, and IV, SAR86, and Flavobacteriaceae groups including NS4, NS5, and NS2b.

Seasonal shifts are especially evident in the surface mixed layer, where winter microbial communities differ from those observed in summer. These differences are associated with seasonal changes in vertical mixing, stratification, light availability, and phytoplankton production, which alter environmental conditions in the upper ocean. Taxa reported to increase in winter include Thaumarchaeota, Deltaproteobacteria, Marinimicrobia, Nitrospinae, Chloroflexi, and Gemmatimonadetes. Winter communities between 10 and 100 m were found to cluster separately from summer communities between 10 and 50 m, indicating recurring seasonal differences in upper-water microbial structure,

Depth-related variation is also high below the surface. At depths greater than about 100 m, community composition was reported to be more seasonally stable, while taxa associated with chemoautotrophic processes became more prominent. These deeper communities included groups such as Nitrosopumilales and Marinimicrobia, both of which increased with depth. Other groups, including Euryarchaeota and Deltaproteobacteria, especially the SAR324 clade, were most abundant just above or within the oxygen minimum zone,

Some major groups remain present across the water column but differ in composition with depth. Gammaproteobacteria, for example, were reported to comprise roughly 10–15% of the community throughout the water column, although the dominant orders changed with depth. In surface waters, SAR86, SAR92, and OM43 were more abundant, whereas Thiomicrospirales were more common in the mesopelagic and Alteromonadales, Xanthomonadales, Pseudomonadales, and Oceanospirillales were more abundant in deeper waters. Within the Alphaproteobacteria, SAR11 clade Ia was associated mainly with surface waters, while SAR11 clades II and Ib were more common below the surface.

Phytoplankton and primary producers

Phytoplankton communities at Ocean Station Papa are characteristic of the high-nutrient, low-chlorophyll (HNLC) conditions of the northeast subarctic Pacific, where chlorophyll concentrations remain relatively low despite the constant presence of macronutrients. Under these conditions, the phytoplankton community is dominated by small cells smaller than 5 µm, rather than by large bloom-forming taxa . At OSP, the <5 µm assemblage has been described as consisting mainly of autotrophic flagellates and some cyanobacteria such as Synechococcus.

Larger phytoplankton, especially diatoms, are generally much less abundant in offshore waters because iron limitation restricts nitrate use and suppresses large-cell productivity, particularly in summer. As a result, Ocean Station Papa typically shows low chlorophyll concentrations and weak seasonality in offshore biomass and primary production compared with nearshore stations along Line P. There is seasonal variation in nutrient use and community activity. Offshore nutrient drawdown begins in spring, with nitrate declining earlier and for longer than silicate, a pattern which suggests that diatom growth is concentrated mainly from May to July, while other phytoplankton groups account for nitrate uptake before and after that period.

The persistence of small-cell dominance has also been linked to microzooplankton grazing, which has been described as an important control on the dominant small phytoplankton at OSP. Evidence from iron-enrichment experiments further supports the view that phytoplankton size structure at OSP is closely tied to iron supply, as added iron led to higher chlorophyll concentrations and a shift toward larger cells, especially diatoms, rather than the small cells that typically dominate under ambient conditions. Overall these studies describe OSP as a system in which small phytoplankton dominate under iron-limited HNLC conditions, while larger seasonal blooms remain limited unless iron availability increases.

Response to environmental change

Environmental change at Ocean Station Papa has been associated with shifts in prokaryotic community composition, including changes in the relative abundance of bacterial and archaeal groups across depths and seasons. During the 2014-2015 marine heatwave, known as the Blob, sea-surface temperatures in the northeast subarctic Pacific were about 1-4 °C above average. The anomaly first developed in the upper 100 m of the water column and extended to about 200 m by 2015. At OSP, prokaryotic communities continued to vary with depth and season, but these patterns became more pronounced during the Blob. The study reported a shift away from communities that were more often particle-associated before the heatwave and toward groups that were more free-living and chemoautotrophic during it . This indicates that the heatwave was associated with a reorganization of the microbial community, changing the balance between taxa with different ecological roles.

During the Blob, the depth- and season-related structure of prokaryotic communities at OSP became more significant, and community composition shifted away from more particle-associated assemblages toward taxa described as more free-living and chemoautotrophic. This indicates that warming affected not only individual groups, but also the broader organization of the microbial community. The same study also noted that the Blob affected the broader planktonic setting in which these microbes occurred. Enhanced stratification during the heatwave reduced vertical mixing and surface-water nutrient concentrations at OSP, while phytoplankton community composition shifted toward smaller cells in spring under Blob conditions . These changes likely altered the environmental context in which prokaryotic communities developed.

Long-term observations along Line P place these shorter events in a broader context. Measurements collected over several decades have documented substantial interannual variability in nutrient concentrations, temperature, and mixed-layer conditions in the northeast subarctic Pacific. Variability in upper mixed-layer nutrients beyond the shelf has also been linked to larger climatic influences, including east-west winds and the Pacific Decadal Oscillation. Environmental change at OSP has also been linked to differences in how microbial communities process organic matter. During a DOM remineralization experiment carried out as part of the 2018 EXPORTS field study, more bioavailable organic matter was associated with changes in bacterioplankton composition, average carbon remineralization rates of 0.19 ± 0.08 μmol C L⁻¹ d⁻¹, and bacterial growth efficiencies of 31 ± 7%. Under these conditions, increases were observed in groups such as Flavobacteriaceae NS2b, Rhodobacteraceae Sulfitobacter, and Alteromonadales/Marinobacter, linking changes in microbial community composition to differences in carbon processing at the site.

== Carbon cycling and microbial loop ==
=== Bacterioplankton carbon demand ===
At Ocean Station PAPA, heterotrophic bacterioplankton are major recyclers of dissolved organic carbon and strongly affect export efficiency. Specifically, these microorganisms are regulated by abiotic factors, including light, climate, and the amount of nutrients available in the water, given seasonal conditions. The effects of large-scale environmental factors over a period of days to weeks are impacted by the grazing, photosynthesis,, viral lysis, and grazing. These factors determine the success and abundance of specific bacterioplankton populations.

Bacterioplankton contribute significantly and play a key role in Carbon cycling, but these contributions can be difficult to measure. However, as a part of the Export Process in the Oceans from RemoTe Sensing (EXPORTS) Program, previous research has been able to measure the influence of bacterioplankton communities and dissolved organic matter (DOM) composition on the Carbon Cycle. Notably, recorded measurements of Bacterioplankton production rates related positively with the rate of DOM degradation. Significant contributions were also found to be from the Flavobacteriaceae family. Because OSP is a high nutrient, low- chlorophyll (HNLC) region, it has been used extensively to study how carbon is transferred from surface waters to the mesopelagic ocean through sinking dissolved sources of carbon. See also: Biological Pump and Ocean carbon cycle.

The annual net primary production (NPP) is produced by phytoplankton found globally across the world's oceans, and despite making up less than 0.2% of photosynthetic biomass, maintain rapid turn over times that contribute for nearly half of the NPP by the amount of oxygen and new organic matter they produce.

By comparison, the Bacterioplankton Carbon Demand (BCD) is estimated to account for 20 to 100% of the decrease in the sinking Particulate Organic Carbon flux with depth. The estimated net BCD can be estimated as the sum of the net amount of heterotrophic bacterioplankton to the carbon that is respired in the form of carbon dioxide.

Comparing the BCD to NPP allows researchers at OSP to evaluate how much NPP can support BCD. The ratio between BCD:NPP have been reported as low as 0, while exceeding 1 in other regions. The BCD:NPP ratio is important to identify regions of net primary productivity. In regions where BCD:NPP is low, such as at OSP, the microbial loop has been determined to be "malfunctioning" by some researchers. This can occur for several reasons including phytoplankton growth exceeding the metabolic capacity of heterotrophic consumption, the production of the product or precursors to recalcitrant compounds, or the inability of phytoplankton to grow on the available organic matter within the region.

=== Dissolved organic matter (DOM) dynamics ===
Dissolved organic matter (DOM) is an important carbon pool at Ocean Station PAPA (OSP), where its composition strongly influences microbial productivity and carbon recycling. The bioavailability of Dissolved Organic Matter (DOM) is critical to the composition of microbial communities. As OSP is a high-nutrient, low-chlorophyll region, microbial processing of DOM plays a major role in determining whether carbon is bioavailable in the water column. The results showed that it is possible that multiple classes are responsible for removing organic carbon and the degrading of OM by heterotrophic bacteria, including classes Bacteroidetes, Alphaproteobacteria, and Gammaproteobacteria, of which are heterotrophic bacteriophages.

Ocean Station PAPA (OSP) is located in the subarctic North East Pacific, and experiences seasonal changes in both the biomass and productivity of bacterioplankton. Recent changes observed in the 2018 Export Process in Ocean from Remote Sensing (EXPORTS) field study found changes in the OM Bioavailability at Ocean Station PAPA. Late-summer BGE values averaged 31 ± 7%, indicating that heterotrophic microbes converted a substantial fraction of DOM into biomass while also contributing to carbon remineralization in high-nutrient, iron-limited regions. Bacterioplankton production, as well as net primary production can nearly double during the spring and summer season at OSP despite iron limitations that cause high-nutrient, low chlorophyll conditions.

At OSP, BGE is directly influenced by the composition of DOM and the activity of Methylophilaceae, and Flavobacteriaceae, two important taxa of heterotrophic bacterioplankton. Surface water measurements at 5m and above showed bacteria increased by 0.7 ± 0.2 micromoles of C per liter by the stationary phase. Further, carbon remineralization rates averaged 0.19 ± 0.09 micromoles of Carbon per litre per day over a 6 to 10 day period. These observations suggest seasonal changes in DOM quality strongly regulate microbial carbon cycling at Ocean Station PAPA. However, there are still knowledge gaps and uncertainties about the measurement of BGE values across ocean ecosystems.

=== Biological carbon pump ===
The Biological Carbon Pump and Microbial Loop, illustrating the movement of carbon (CO2) from the atmosphere, and transformation of Particulate Organic Carbon (POC), Dissolved Organic Matter (DOM) and Refractory Dissolved Organic Carbon (RDOC) in the ocean.

At Ocean Station PAPA, the biological carbon pump is dominated by particle export and zooplankton-mediated transport. In contrast, the solubility pump results from an increase in the solubility of carbon dioxide into cold water, and its movement to the deep ocean through downwelling, and upwelling to move abiotic and biotic carbon from the euphotic zone into deeper, mesopelagic waters.

=== The EXPORTS Program at Ocean Station PAPA ===
The Export Process in the Ocean from RemoTe Sensing (EXPORTS) conducted field campaigns at Ocean Station PAPA and is responsible for developing a predictive understanding and fate of the ocean's primary productivity, and how this affects the global carbon cycle in the ocean, as well as future climates. It is a multi-institutional effort which uses ocean optics, remote sensing, and molecular biology to understand the transport of carbon from the ocean's surface to deeper, mesopelagic waters. Led by NASA, the data collected by satellite provides global observations of the amount of phytoplankton stocks and rates of primary production between the euphotic zone to the mesopelagic zone. The ultimate goal of EXPORTS is to provide new insights on ocean carbon cycling.

The EXPORTS Field Campaigns was conducted at OSP, a region characterized as a high nutrient zone that experiences very little recycling as a result of its ocean mixed layer. Researchers in this campaign found that the mixed layer located at the surface of the ocean and zooplankton populations was found to mediate most of the transport of organic matter to deeper oceanic depths below 500m. The campaign was conducted in the North Pacific Ocean, where the ocean current conditions and biogeochemical fields, as well as low temporal variability, characterized the fall season at OSP. These findings allowed researchers to better understand the biological carbon pump during the fall season at OSP.

At OSP, Marine snow and zooplankton fecal pellets are major export pathways. Heterotrophic bacterioplankton and archaea play a dual role in the ocean's biological carbon pump; they both form sinking POC and are the primary drivers of degrading POC. Sinking particles are a critical conduit for moving organic material at the surface of the ocean to deeper ocean waters. This is illustrated at Ocean Station PAPA, where Marine snow aggregates into transparent exopolymer particle (TEP). As these pellets are more dense, they often sink faster than aggregates. To measure the efficiency of sinking POC before dissolving in the deep ocean, researchers use particle transfer efficiency, or T_{eff}. Currently, factors that regulate POC dissolution are poorly understood compared to the production of POC by autotrophs near the surface of the ocean.

Because of its long observational record and relatively stable open-ocean conditions, Ocean Station PAPA remains a major reference site for understanding carbon sequestration in the North Pacific Subtropical Gyre, where Deep-sea Gammaproteobacteria, as well as Epsilonproteobacteria make up 80% of the bacterial community which remineralize POC. These dense communities produce extracellular enzymes like lipases, carbohydrases, and proteases to break down POC. This POC will become DOC, of which is respired as CO_{2}.

=== Microbial Carbon Pump ===
In iron-limited water such as at Ocean Station PAPA, the conversion of labile DOC to recalcitrant DOC occurs through the microbial carbon pump. The Microbial Carbon Pump (MCP) describes the transformation of bioavailable and labile DOM into recalcitrant dissolved organic matter (RDOC). This occurs through various microbial processes and contributes to the long-term storage of organic carbon by sequestering through several metabolic and ecological processes to produce carbon compounds resistant to degradation. This process is significant because of small changes in the persistence of DOC, even compared to the atmospheric amount of CO_{2}.

Microbial communities convert labile DOM into RDOC through selective consumption, transformation, or the re-synthesis of organic compounds. During these processes, microbes will use easily-degradable organic carbon substrates and release less-bioavailable carbon compounds. For example, bacterioplankton will transform simple organic compounds into RDOC by using repeated cycles of uptaking and releasing labile DOC, reducing the likelihood that the carbon will be respired back into the atmosphere as CO_{2}.

RDOC production is important for long-term carbon sequestration. As RDOC is resistant to microbial degradation, it is able to remain sequestered from any time scale from decades to millennia; this allows for organic carbon sources to move from short-term biogeochemical cycling to long-term storage. As a result, the MCP provides a mechanism to store carbon sources independently of particle sinking, and allow carbon storage to occur beyond the biological pump. Moreover, abiotic conditions including temperature, nutrient availability, and microbial community composition can influence the efficiency of RDOC production.

== Nutrient Cycling ==
=== Iron Limitation and the Iron Fertilization Hypothesis ===
Ocean Station PAPA is a high-nutrient, low chlorophyll (HNLC) region where nitrate remains available but phytoplankton growth is limited by iron, a key limiting micronutrient. The Martin Iron Hypothesis states that the abundance of phytoplankton depends on the bioavailability of iron, which regulates their growth specifically within HNLC regions. Increasing iron supply, as such, has been suggested to enhance primary productivity and draw down more atmospheric CO_{2}. This hypothesis was originally proposed by John Martin, who famously summarized the hypothesis in the idea as such: "Give me a half tanker of iron, and I will give you an ice age". The most notable of HNLC enrichment experiments was IronEx II, which demonstrated that adding bioavailable iron to HNLC waters led to rapid phytoplankton growth and the development of phytoplankton blooms dominated by large diatoms.

Microbial productivity and community structure is strongly influenced by the addition of iron. When more iron is available, phytoplankton communities can shift from consisting of small picoplankton to larger diatoms; With larger diatoms present, food webs dynamics are shifted, and export efficiency is increased. In HNLC regions, iron limitation can also constrain nitrogen fixation. As Diazotrophs require iron-rich enzymes such as nitrogenase, which requires iron, iron availability constrains broader nutrient cycling.

=== Nitrogen and Phosphorus Cycling ===
Although iron is the dominant limiting nutrient at Ocean Station PAPA, Nitrogen (N) and Phosphorus (P) remain essential to seasonal productivity and heterotrophic respiration. During Re-mineralization, heterotrophic bacteria release ammonium (NH_{4}^{+}) and phosphate (PO₄³⁻) and replenish nutrient concentrations including N and P in the water column. This microbial recycling is important, especially in oligotrophic regions where nutrient supply from deeper water is limited and nutrients are in low concentrations.

At OSP, microbial recycling of ammonium and phosphate helps sustain seasonal productivity despite iron limitation. Nitrogen fixation, as well as phosphorus cycling, is carried out by diazotrophic microorganisms such as Trichodesmium. These microbes can access dissolved organic phosphorus (DOP) which are not bioavailable in the water column through the production of enzymes such as alkaline phosphatase. This species of marine microbe introduces nitrogen from a new source into the ocean, and is tightly regulated by oxygen and nutrient availability. Due to its uptake of phosphorus and access to a limited, unavailable resource, Trichodesmium can also influence community composition.

Nutrient cycling stoichiometry is critical at OSP where nutrients can be limited. Nutrient content is often described using the Redfield Ratio (C:N:P ≈ 106:16:1). The Redfield ratio describes the ratio of organic nutrients on average across oceans globally. Microbial remineralization tends to occur in proportions similar to this ratio. However, deviations from the Redfield ratio are common and reflect variations in microbial community structure, nutrient available and environmental conditions. The deviations in these environments can influence carbon export efficiency; as a result, communities can become more or less productive and change the balance between carbon fixation and re-mineralization, especially in HNLC regions such as Ocean Station PAPA.

== Climate Change Implications ==
=== Effects of Climate Change ===
Station P has many uses in measuring the effects of climate change in the ocean through sampling over time. Samples from Station P can be analyzed to see if there are any shifts in temperature, salinity, and oxygen. From water samples collected it can be seen that the ocean surface layer is warming throughout time. Salinity levels were also decreasing from surface to pycnocline, however this could be due to the Blob event that happened during 2014-2015 where the ocean experienced warmer than usual temperatures. Samples from the deep ocean have shown a trend of warming as well as freshening, indicating that more fresh water is being added into the ocean. Station P has also shown that there is a trend happening from 1960-2018, where the water column from pycnocline to 2000 meters depth has experience strong deoxygenation during this period.

=== Temperature Effects on Microbial Community ===
The effects of high temperatures at Station P can be seen after studying samples before, during, and after the Blob event. Before the Blob was in full effect, prochlorococcus was found in higher amounts when usually it's not abundant in waters around Station P, which means that warming waters could be linked to an increase of prochlorococcus communities. Different prokaryote communities differed during the Blob year compared to previous years, linking that temperature changes can cause different organisms to grow, thus potentially changing organism dynamics. Another noticeable change was in the zooplankton; zooplankton communities that favour warmer waters were increased compared to non-Blob years.

Changing temperatures can affect microbial communities as seen by Station P. These changes can have effects on production and abundance of the microbial communities, resulting in environmental differences between years.

== Location, Equipment, and Future Implications ==
=== Cruise Locations and CTDs and Rosette/Bongos ===
Ocean Station PAPA has cruises that happen along Line P that allow for data collection. The cruises take place along Line P which has 26 stations along the route that spans off the coast of British Columbia, Canada. Line P cruises happen on an ongoing basis. There are CTDs as well as Rosette/Bongo equipment used that measure at various depths along the line, ranging from around 100 meters depth to 4300 meter depth. The CTDs and Rosette/Bongo both measure for temperature, conductivity, transmissivity, fluorescence, and dissolved oxygen. The Rosette/Bongo also lets researchers analyze dissolved oxygen, dissolved inorganic carbon, alkalinity, pH, nutrients, and salinity from water samples taken at various pressures from 5 to 4000 decibars (dbar). A difference between the CTDs and Rosette/Bongos are that CTDs are cast at a pressure of 2000 dbars.

=== Other Projects ===
Similar to Ocean Station PAPA, another project called Argo also measures temperature and salinity of the ocean. Project Argo has around 4000 profiling floats across the globe and are controlled by satellites, to help with positioning. The 10 day lifecycle of the profiling floats consists of sinking down in the ocean, and rising back up to the surface in order to collect data from different depths. Researchers are able to use this data within hours after collection to help with determining forecasts. Project Argo differs from Ocean Station PAPA because Argo has multiple profiling floats across the globe, whereas Station P is situation in one location.
