= Viral shunt =

Mechanism that maintains marine microbial diversity

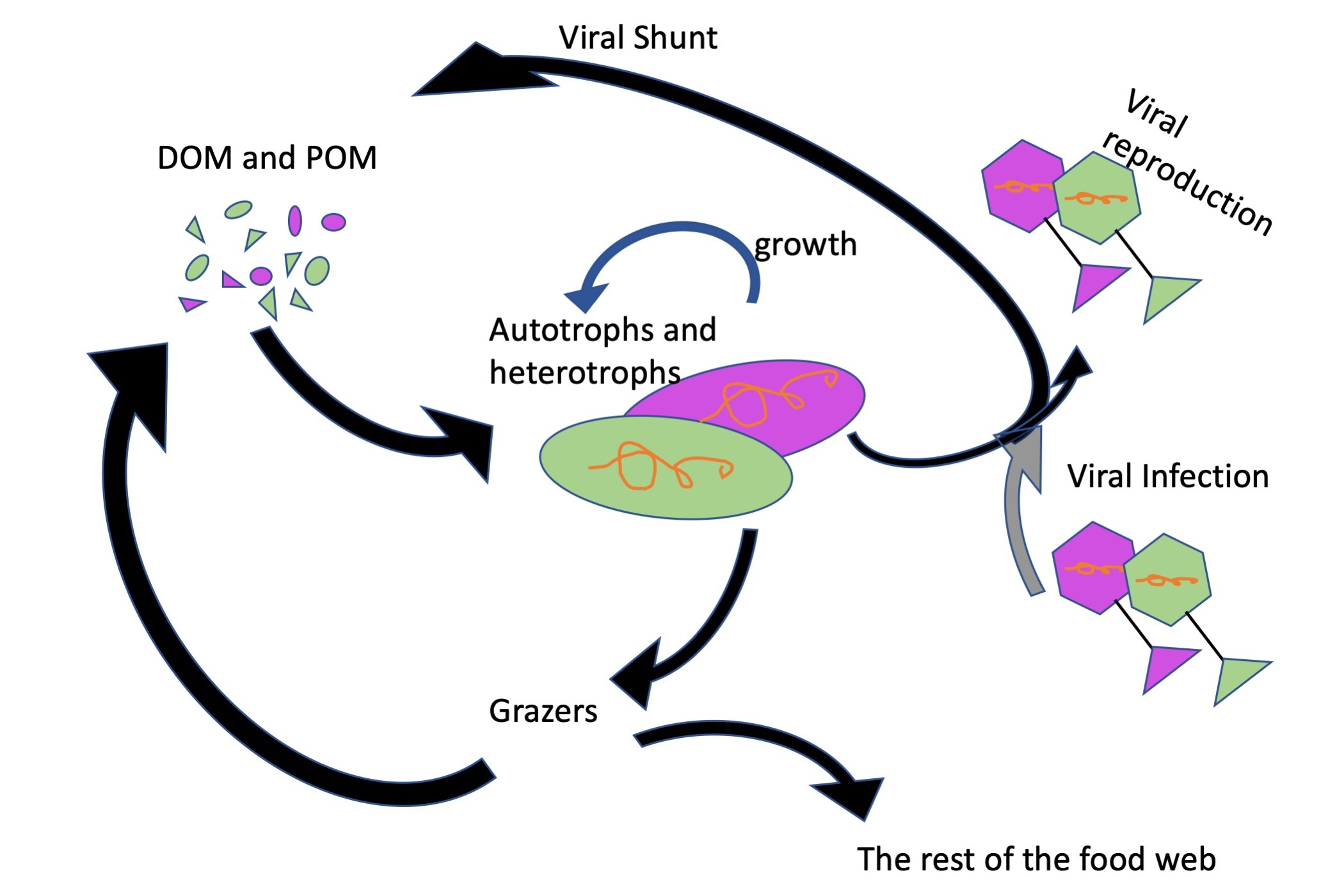
The flow of DOM and POM through the food web, with the location of the viral shunt pathway noted

The viral shunt is a mechanism that prevents marine microbial particulate organic matter (POM) from migrating up trophic levels by recycling them into dissolved organic matter (DOM), which can be readily taken up by microorganisms. The DOM recycled by the viral shunt pathway is comparable to the amount generated by the other main sources of marine DOM.

Viruses can easily infect microorganisms in the microbial loop due to their relative abundance compared to microbes. Prokaryotic and eukaryotic mortality contribute to carbon nutrient recycling through cell lysis. There is evidence as well of nitrogen (specifically ammonium) regeneration. This nutrient recycling helps stimulate microbial growth. As much as 25% of the primary production from phytoplankton in the global oceans may be recycled within the microbial loop through the viral shunt.

== Discovery and impact ==
Viral shunt was first described in 1999 by Steven W. Wilhelm and Curtis A. Suttle. Their original paper has since been cited over 1000 times. For his contributions to understanding of viral roles in marine ecosystems, Suttle has received numerous awards, including being named a Fellow of the Royal Society of Canada, receiving the A.G. Huntsman Award for Excellence in Marine Science, and the Timothy R. Parsons Medal for Excellence in Ocean Sciences from the Department of Fisheries and Oceans. Both Suttle and Wilhelm have been elected Fellows of the American Academy of Microbiology as well as the Association for the Sciences of Limnology and Oceanography (ASLO).

The field of marine virology has rapidly expanded since the mid-1990s, coinciding with the first publication of viral shunt. During this time, further studies have established the existence of the viral shunt as a "fact" of the field. The recycling of nutrients in the viral shunt has indicated to scientists that viruses are a necessary component in new models of global change. Virologists in soil sciences have begun to investigate the application of viral shunt to explain nutrient recycling in terrestrial systems. More recently, new theories concerning the potential role of viruses in carbon export - grouped under the idea of the "viral shuttle" have emerged. While perhaps at odds on the surface, these theories are not mutually exclusive.

== Bacterial growth efficiency ==
There is evidence to suggest that the viral shunt system can directly control bacterial growth efficiency (BGE) in pelagic regions. Carbon flow models indicated that decreased BGE could be largely explained by the viral shunt, which caused the conversion of bacterial biomass to DOM. The biodiversity in these pelagic environments are so tightly coupled that the production of viruses depends on their bacterial host metabolisms, so any factors that limit bacterial growth also limit viral growth.

Enrichment of nitrogen has been observed to allow for an increase in viral production (up to 3-fold) but not bacterial biomass. Through the viral shunt a high viral-induced mortality relative to bacterial growth resulted in the effective generation of DOC/DOM that is available for microbial re-consumption and offers an effective way to recycle key nutrients within the microbial food web.

Data extracted from other aquatic regions such as the Western-North Pacific displayed large variability, which may be a result of methodologies and environmental conditions. Nonetheless, a common trend appeared to be a reduced BGE with an increasing viral shunt pathway. From carbon flow models it is clear that viral shunting allows bacterial biomass to be converted to DOC/DOM that are ultimately recycled such that the bacteria may consume the DOC/DOM, indicating that the viral shunt pathway is a major regulator of BGE in marine pelagic waters.

== Links to microbial processes ==
=== Microbial loop ===
The microbial loop acts as a pathway and connection between different relationships in an ecosystem. The microbial loop connects the pool of DOM to the rest of the food web, specifically various microorganisms in the water column. This allows for constant cycling of this dissolved organic matter. Stratification of the water column due to the pycnocline affects the amount of dissolved carbon in the upper mixing layer, and the mechanisms shows seasonal variation.

The microbial loop is based on micro-interactions between different trophic levels of microbes and organisms. When nutrients enter the microbial loop, they tend to remain in the photic zone longer, due to the location, and slow sinking rates of microbes. Eventually, through varying processes, DOM, through use of available nutrients, is produced by phytoplankton, as well as consumed by bacteria. Bacteria utilize this DOM, yet are then preyed on by larger microbes, such as microflagellates, which helps to regenerate nutrients.

Viruses tend to outnumber bacterial abundance by about ten times and phytoplankton by about a hundred times in the upper mixing layer and bacterial abundance tends to decrease with depth, while phytoplankton remain closer to shallow depths. The effects of the viral shunt are more pronounced in the upper mixing layer. Viruses found can be non-specific (broad host range), abundant, and can infect all forms of microbes. Viruses are a magnitude higher in abundance in almost all aquatic locations compared to their microbial hosts, allowing high rates/levels of microbial infection.

The impact of the viral shunt varies seasonally as many microbes show seasonal abundance maximums in temperate and oligotrophic waters during different times of the year, meaning viral abundance also varies with season.

=== Biological pump ===
The viral shunt may result in increased respiration from the system. It also helps export carbon through the biological pump. This is a very significant process as approximately 3 gigatonnes of carbon may be sequestered per year due to lysed and virus-infected cells having faster sinking rates. The biological pump has an important role at sequestering carbon to the benthic zone, thereby impacting global carbon cycles, budget, and even affecting temperature. Crucial nutrients, such as nitrogen, phosphorus, cellular components, such as amino acids and nucleic acids, would be sequestered through the biological pump in the event of cells sinking. Viral shunting helps increase the efficiency of the biological pump by mostly altering the proportion of carbon that is exported to deep water (such as the recalcitrant carbon-rich cell walls from virally lysed bacteria) in a process called the Shunt and Pump. This allows the crucial nutrients to be retained in the surface waters. Concurrently, a more efficient biological pump also results in an increase in nutrient influx towards the surface, which is beneficial to primary production, especially in more oligotrophic region. Despite viruses being in the smallest scales of biology, the viral shunt pathway has a profound effect on food webs across marine environments as well as on a more macro scale on the global carbon budget.

== Recycling of nutrients ==
=== Carbon cycling ===
Viral shunt influences carbon cycling in marine environments by infecting microbes and redirecting the type of organic matter that enters the carbon pool. Phototrophs constitute a large population of primary production in marine environments and are responsible for a large flux of carbon entering the carbon cycle in marine environments. However, bacteria, zooplankton and phytoplankton, (and other free-floating organisms) also contribute to the global marine carbon cycle. When these organisms eventually die and decompose, their organic matter either enters the pool of particulate organic matter (POM) or dissolved organic matter (DOM). Much of the POM generated is composed of carbon-rich complex structures that is unable to be decomposed effectively by most prokaryotes and archaea in the oceans. Export of carbon-rich POM from the upper surface layer to deep oceans causes increased efficiency of the biological pump due to a higher carbon-to-nutrient ratio.

DOM is smaller and tends to stay mixed within the euphotic zone of the water column. The labile DOM is easier for microbes to digest and recycle, allowing incorporation of carbon into biomass. As microbial biomass increases due to the incorporation of DOM, most microbial populations such as heterotrophic bacteria will be preyed on by organisms at higher trophic levels such as grazers or zooplankton. However, about 20 to 40 percent of the bacterial biomass (with similar and relative amounts of eukaryotes) will become infected by viruses. The effect of this energy flow results is less carbon entering higher trophic levels and a significant portion being respired and cycled between the microbes in the water column.

Based on this mechanism, as more carbon enters the DOM pool, most of the matter is used for increasing microbial biomass. When the viral shunt kills a portion of these microbes, it decreases the amount of carbon that gets transferred to higher trophic levels by converting it back to DOM and POM. Most of the generated POM is recalcitrant and will eventually make it down to the deep oceans where it accumulates. The resulting DOM that re-enters the DOM pool to be used by phototrophs and heterotrophs is less than the amount of DOM that originally entered the DOM pool. This phenomenon is due to the unlikeliness of organic matter being 100% DOM after a viral lytic infection.

=== Nitrogen cycling ===
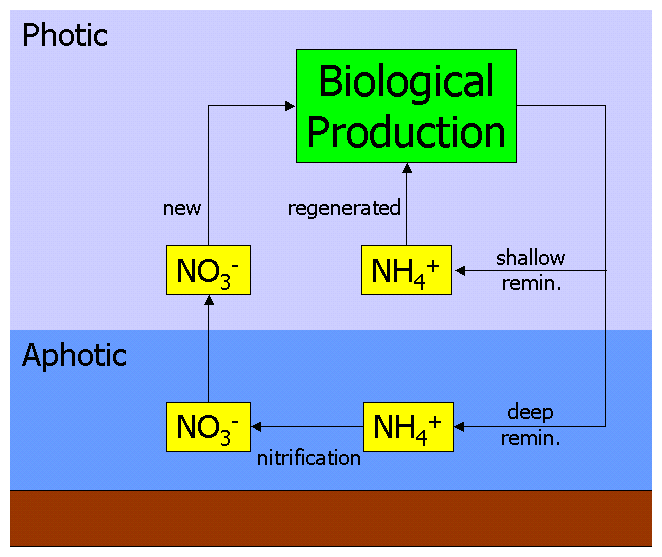
Flow chart of nitrification in the deep ocean (aphotic zone) and ammonium regeneration in the upper ocean surface (photic zone)

==== Nitrogen cycle ====
Viral shunt is a big component to the cycling of nitrogen in marine environments. Nitrogen gas from the atmosphere gets dissolved into surface of the water. Nitrogen fixing cyanobacteria, such as Trichodesmium and Anabaena, convert the nitrogen gas (N_{2}) into ammonium (NH_{4}^{+}) for microbes to use. The process of converting nitrogen gas to ammonia (and related nitrogen compounds) is called nitrogen fixation. The process of uptake of ammonium by microbes to be used in protein synthesis is called nitrogen assimilation. The viral shunt causes mass death of heterotrophic bacteria. The decomposition of these microbes releases particulate organic nitrogen (PON) and dissolved organic nitrogen (DON), which either stay in the upper mixing layer or sink to the deeper parts of the ocean. In the deep ocean, PON and DON are converted back into ammonium by remineralisation. This ammonium can be used by deep ocean microbes, or undergo nitrification and be oxidized into nitrites and nitrates. The sequence of nitrification is:

NH_{4}^{+} → NO_{2}^{−} → NO_{3}^{−}

Dissolved nitrates can be consumed by microbes to become re-assimilated, or revert in nitrogen gas by denitrification. The resultant nitrogen gas can then be fixed back into ammonium for assimilation or exit the ocean reservoir and back into atmosphere.

==== Ammonium regeneration ====
Viral shunt is also able to increase ammonium production. The basis for this claim is based on fluctuating carbon-to-nitrogen (C:N in atoms) ratios caused by the viral shunt. Susceptible microorganisms such as bacteria in the water column are more likely to be infected and killed off by viruses, releasing DOM and nutrients containing carbon and nitrogen (about 4C:1N). The remaining microbes that are still alive are assumed to be resistant to that viral infection episode. The DOM and nutrients generated from the death and lysis of susceptible microorganisms are available for uptake by virus-resistant eukaryotes and prokaryotes. The resistant-bacteria uptakes and utilizes the DOC, regenerate ammonium, thereby lowering the C:N ratio. When C:N ratios decrease, ammonium (NH_{4}^{+}) regeneration increases. The bacteria begin converting the dissolved nitrogen into ammonium, which can be used by phytoplankton for growth and biological production. As phytoplankton use up the ammonium (and subsequently limited by nitrogen-species), the C:N ratio begins increasing again and NH_{4}^{+} regeneration slows down. The phytoplankton also shows enhanced growth rates due to uptake of ammonium. The viral shunt is continuously causing changes to the C:N ratio, affecting the composition and presence of nutrients at any given time.

=== Iron cycling ===
A significant fraction of the world's oceans are iron limited, thus the regeneration of iron-nutrients is an important process that is needed for sustaining an ecosystem in this environment. Viral infection of microorganisms (mostly heterotrophs and cyanobacteria) is hypothesized to be an important process in the maintenance of high-nutrient low chlorophyll (HNLC) marine environments. The viral shunt plays a key role in releasing assimilated iron back into the microbial loop which helps sustain primary productivity in these ecosystems. Dissolved iron usually binds with organic matter to form an organic-iron complex that enhances bioavailability of this nutrient to plankton. Some species of bacteria and diatoms are capable of high uptake rates of these organic-iron complexes. Continued viral activity by the viral shunt helps sustain growing ecosystems in iron-limited HNLC regions.

== Effect on the marine food web ==
Viral shunt increases the supply of organic and inorganic nutrients to the pelagic food web. These nutrients increase growth rates of picophytoeukaryotes, particularly in multivore systems. Crucial nutrients such as nitrogen, phosphorus, and DOM found within cells are lysed by the viral shunt pathway, and these nutrients remain within the microbial food web. Naturally, this prevents the export of biomass such as POM to higher trophic levels directly, by diverting the flow of carbon and nutrients from all microbial cells into a DOM pool, recycled and ready for uptake.

Viruses that specifically target cyanobacteria known as cyanophages (found in surface waters) directly affects the marine food web by "short-circuiting" the amount of organic carbon that is transferred to higher trophic levels. These nutrients are made available for uptake by heterotrophic bacteria and phytoplankton alike.

The most common nutrient limiting primary productivity in marine waters is nitrogen, and others such as iron, silica, and vitamin B_{12} have also been discovered to limit growth rate of specific species and taxa. Studies have also identified that heterotrophic bacteria are commonly limited by organic carbon, however some nutrients that limit growth may not limit in other environments and systems. Therefore, viral lysis of these nutrients will have different effects on microbial food webs found in different ecosystems. Another important point to note (on a smaller scale) is that cells contain different fractions of nutrients and cellular components; this will result in different bioavailability of certain nutrients in the microbial food web.

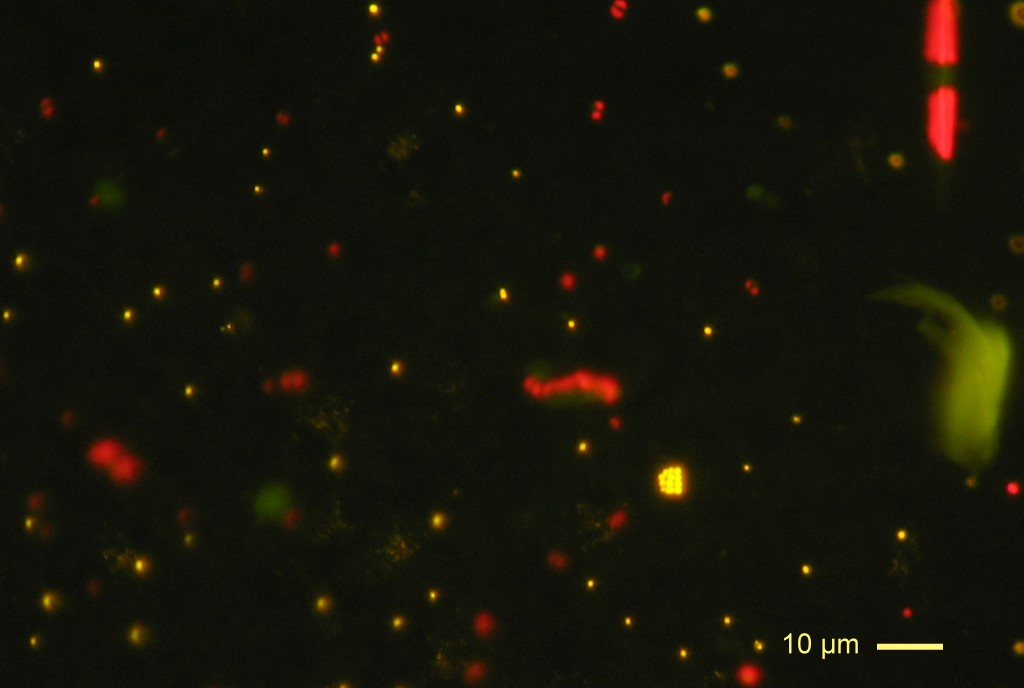
A fluorescence microscopy image of a variety of picoplankton in the Pacific Ocean

=== Important organisms ===
There are many different microbes present in aquatic communities. Phytoplankton, specifically Picoplankton, are the most important organism in this microbial loop. They provide a foundation as primary producers; they are responsible for the majority of primary production in the ocean and around 50% of primary production of the entire planet.

Generally, marine microbes are useful in the microbial loop due to their physical characteristics. They are small, and have high surface area to biomass ratios, allowing for high rates of uptake, even in low concentrations of nutrients. The microbial loop is considered a sink for nutrients such as carbon. Their small size allows for more efficient cycling of nutrients and organic matter compared to larger organisms. Additionally, microbes tend to be pelagic, floating freely in photic surface waters, before sinking down to deeper layers of the ocean. The microbial food web is important because it is the direct target of the viral shunt pathway and all subsequent effects are based on how the viruses affect their microbial hosts. Infection of these microbes through lysis or latent infection have a direct impact of the nutrients recycled, availability, and export within the microbial loop, which can have resonating effects throughout the trophic levels.

=== Shallow water hydrothermal vents ===
Shallow water hydrothermal vents found in the Mediterranean Sea contain a diverse and abundant microbial community known as "hotspots". These communities also contain temperate viruses. An increase in these viruses can cause large mortality of vent microbes, thereby reducing chemoautotrophic carbon production, while at the same time enhancing the metabolism of heterotrophs through recycling of DOC. These results indicate a tight coupling of viruses and primary/secondary production found in these hydrothermal vent communities, as well as having a major effect on the food web energy transfer efficiency to higher trophic levels.

== See also ==
- Marine bacteriophages
