= Tropical peat =

Soil type

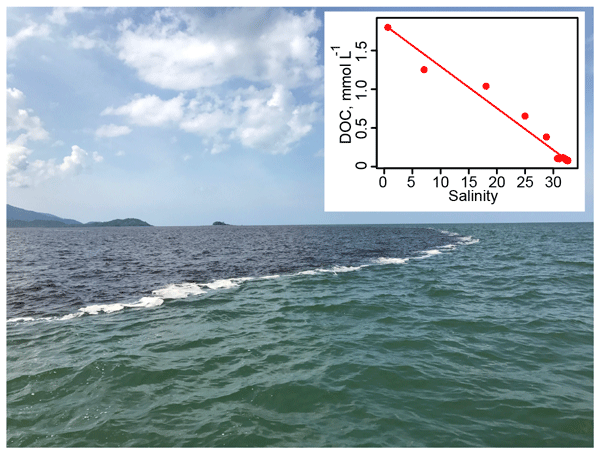
Peatland river water draining into coastal waters South-East Asia is home to one of the world's largest stores of tropical peatland and accounts for roughly 10 % of the global land-to-sea dissolved organic carbon (DOC) flux. The rivers carry high coloured dissolved organic matter (CDOM) concentrations, shown here interfacing with ocean shelf water.

Tropical peat is a type of histosol that is found in tropical latitudes, including South East Asia, Africa, and Central and South America. Tropical peat mostly consists of dead organic matter from trees instead of sphagnum which are commonly found in temperate peat. This soils usually contain high organic matter content, exceeding 75% with dry low bulk density around 0.2 mg/m^{3} (0.0 gr/cu ft).

Areas of tropical peat are found mostly in South America (about 46% by area) although they are also found in Africa, Central America, Asia and elsewhere around the tropics. Tropical peatlands are significant carbon sinks and store large amounts of carbon and their destruction can have a significant impact on the amount of atmospheric carbon dioxide. Tropical peatlands are vulnerable to destabilisation through human and climate induced changes. Estimates of the area (and hence volume) of tropical peatlands vary but a reasonable estimate is in the region of 380,000 square kilometres (150,000 sq mi).

Although tropical peatlands only cover about 0.25% of the Earth's land surface they contain 50,000–70,000 million tonnes of carbon (about 3% global soil carbon). In addition, tropical peatlands support diverse ecosystems and are home to a number of endangered species including the orangutan.

The native peat swamp forests contain a number of valuable timber-producing trees plus a range of other products of value to local communities, such as bark, resins and latex. Land-use changes and fire, mainly associated with plantation development and logging (deforestation and drainage), are reducing this carbon store and contributing to greenhouse gas (GHG) emissions.

The problems that result from development of tropical peatlands stem mainly from a lack of understanding of the complexities of this ecosystem and the fragility of the relationship between peat and forest. Once the forest is removed and the peat is drained, the surface peat oxidises and loses stored carbon rapidly to the atmosphere (as carbon dioxide). This results in progressive loss of the peat surface, leading to local flooding and, due to the large areas involved, global climate change. Failure to account for such emissions results in underestimates of the rate of increase in atmospheric GHGs and the extent of human induced climate change.

== See also ==
- Peat
- Peat swamp forest
