= Peat Cutting Monday =

Public holiday in the Falkland Islands

Peat Cutting Day
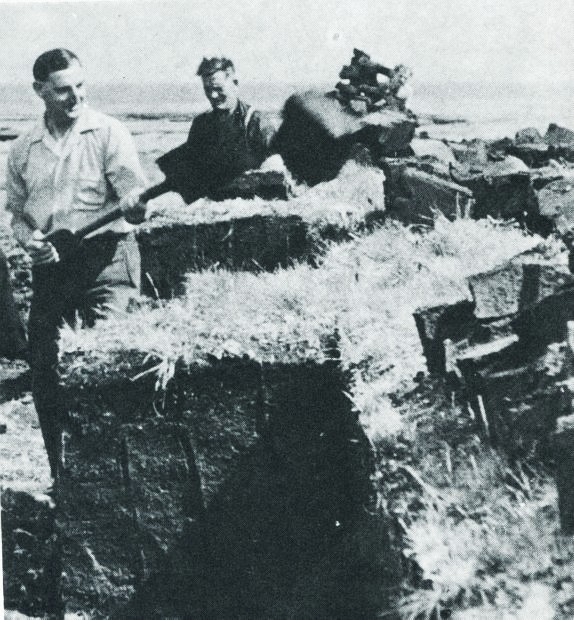
- Falkland Islanders shovelling peat in the 1950s
- Official name: Peat Cutting Day
- Also called: Peat Cutting Day
- Observed by: Falkland Islands
- Type: public holiday
- Observances: Peat cutting, fishing, camping
- Date: First Monday in October
- 2025 date: October 6
- 2026 date: October 5
- 2027 date: October 4
- 2028 date: October 2
- Frequency: annual

Peat Cutting Day is a public holiday in the Falkland Islands that is celebrated on the first Monday in October every year.

== Background ==
Traditionally, Peat Cutting Day was the time of year when Falkland Islanders went out to cut cubes of surface-soil peat which was then used as the primary fuel for heating homes and cooking food in the islands. In 2002, the Executive Council of the Falkland Islands made it an official public holiday to be celebrated on the first Monday in October every year, replacing Falklands Day, which had been celebrated in August.

Little peat cutting takes place in modern times, with the Islanders instead using the day to go fishing and camping.
