= Peat =

Accumulation of partially decayed vegetation

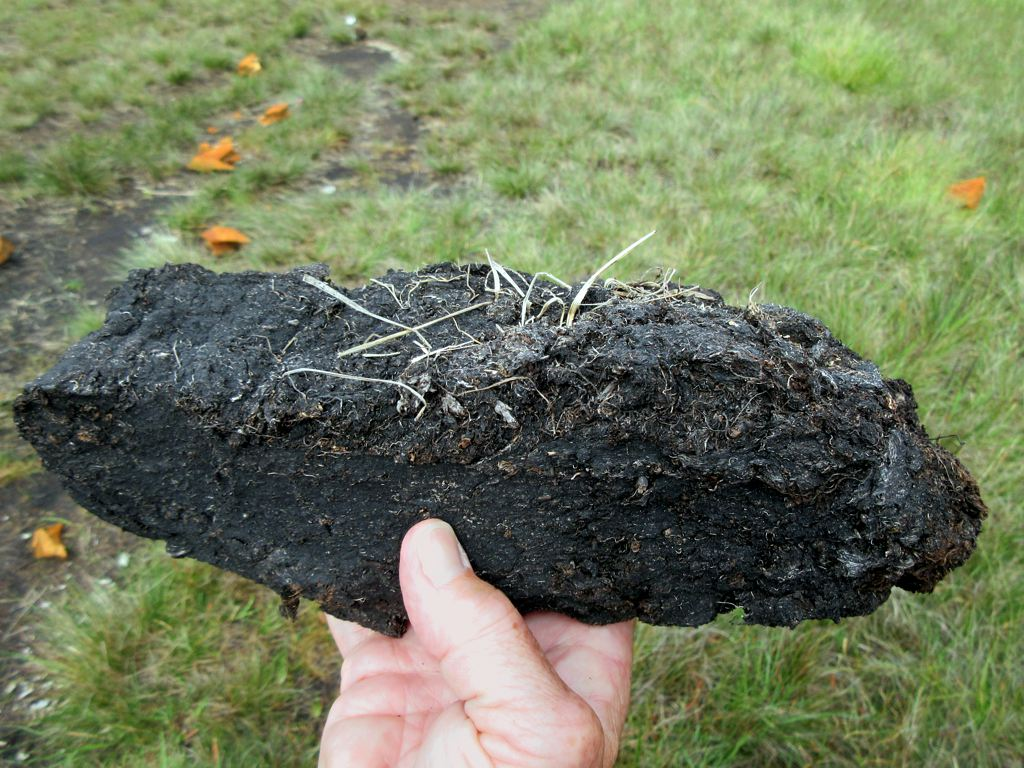
A lump of peat

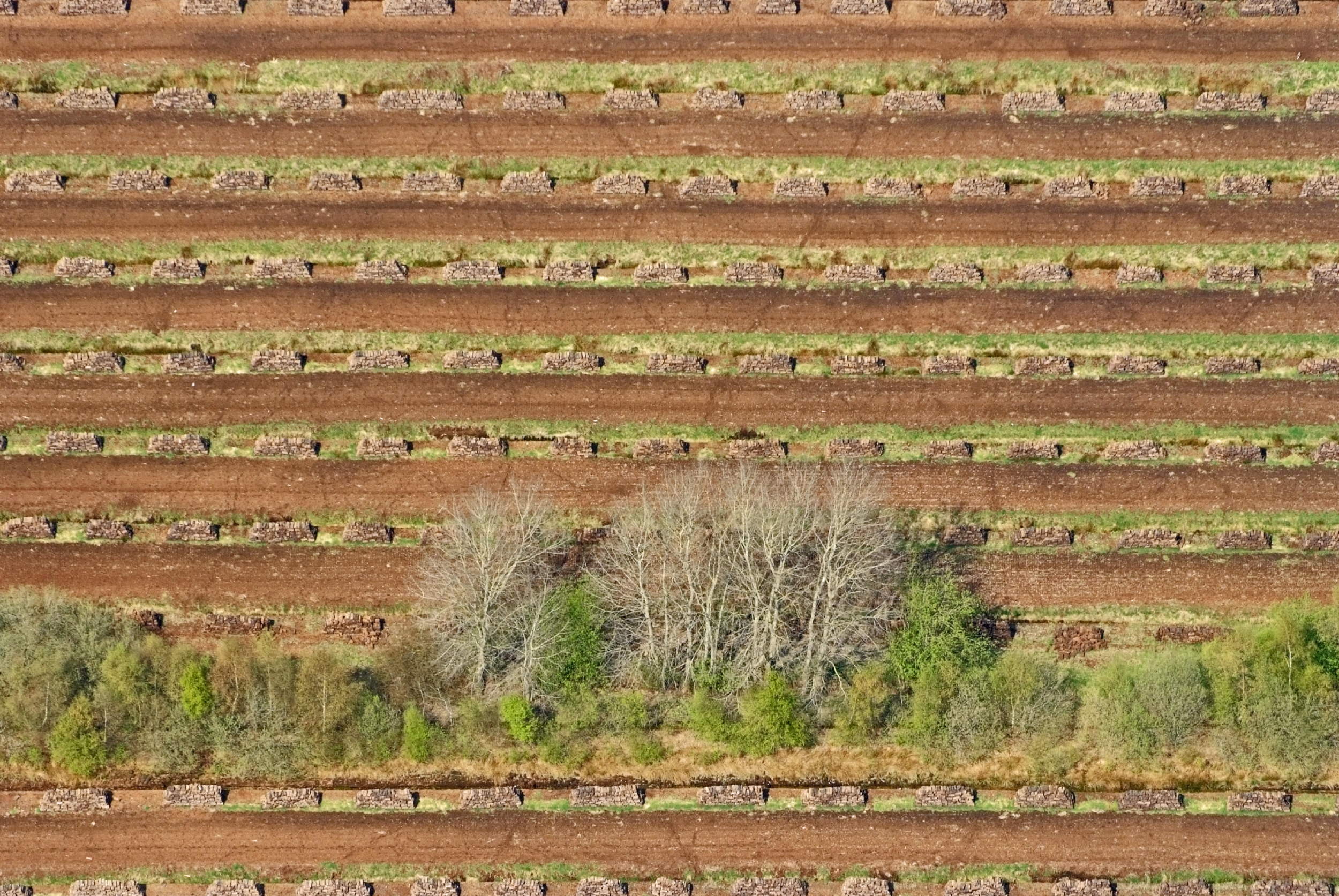
Peat stacks in Südmoslesfehn (district of Oldenburg, Germany) in 2013

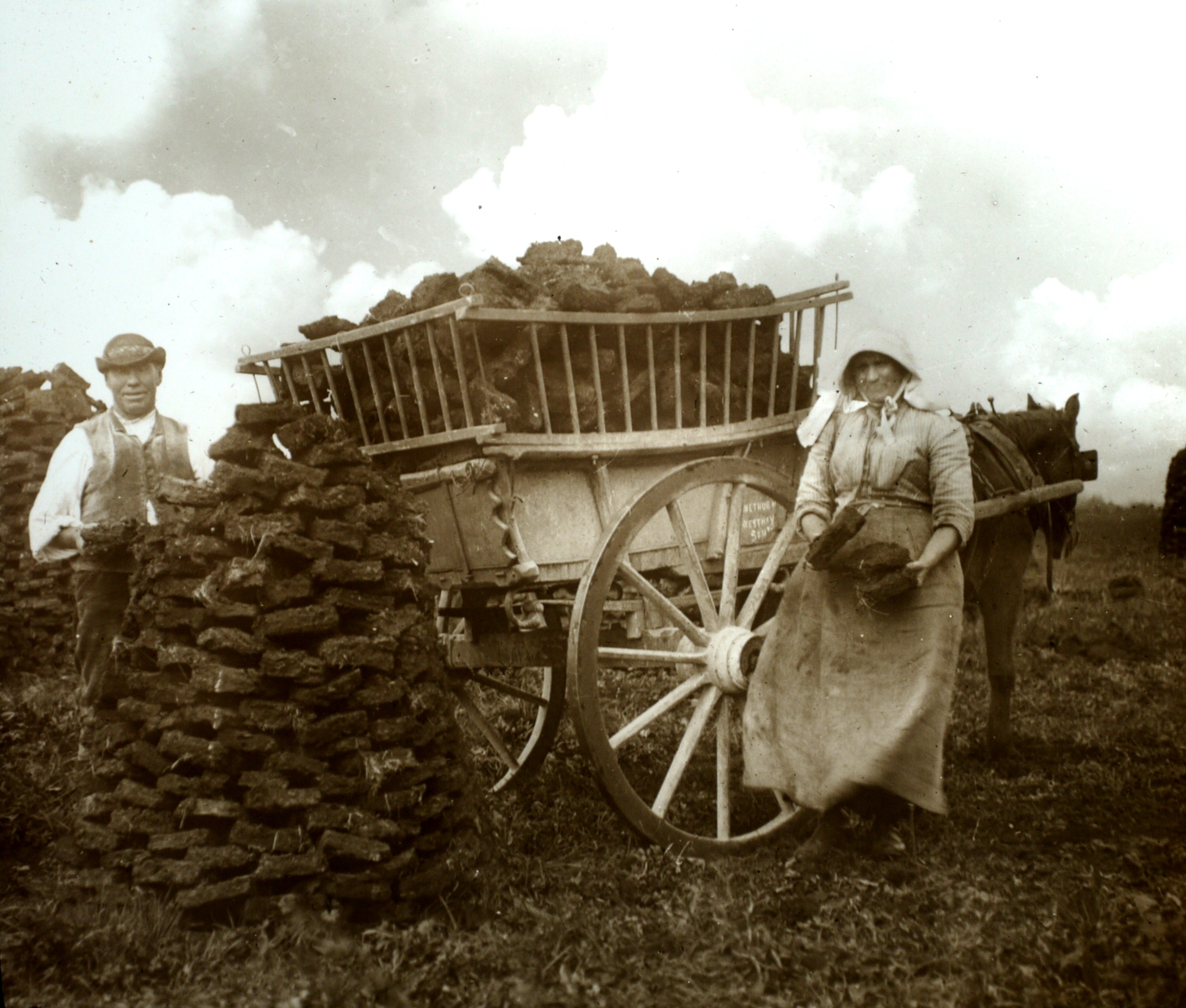
Peat gatherers at Westhay, Somerset Levels in 1905

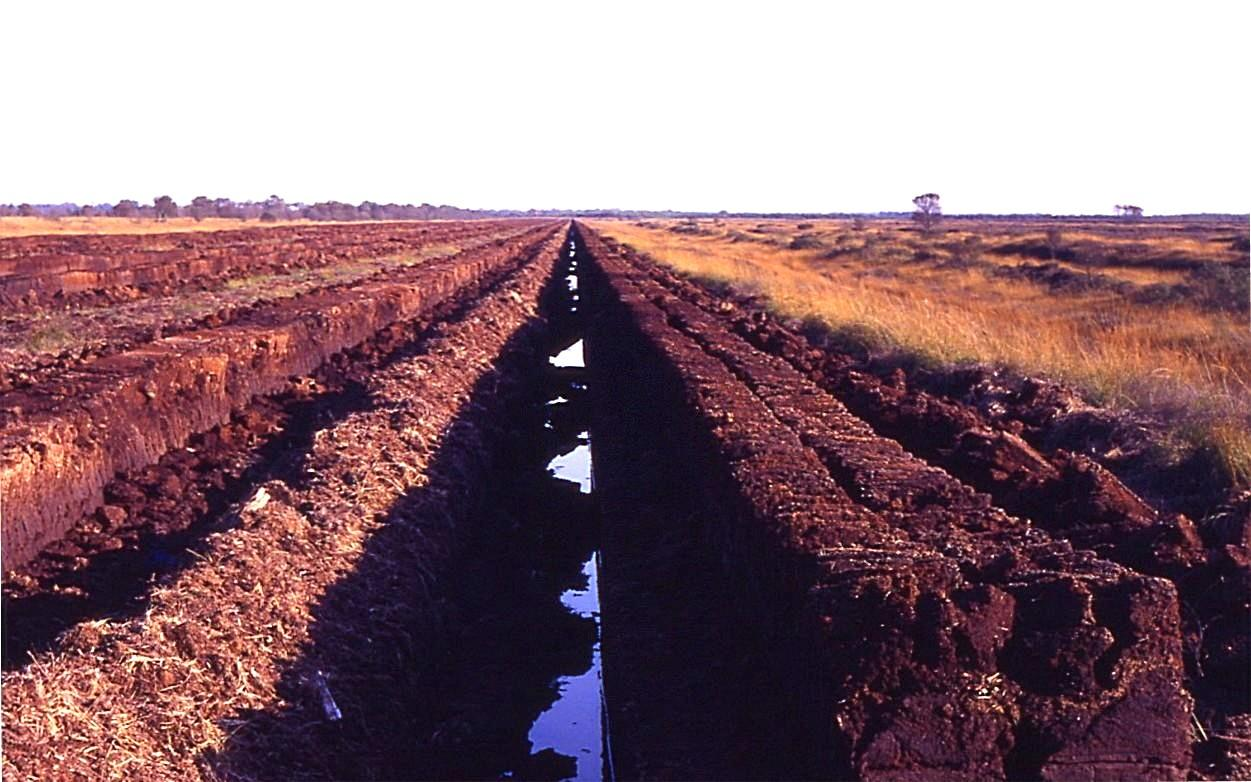
Peat extraction in East Frisia, Germany in 1987

Peat is an accumulation of partially decayed vegetation or organic matter. It is unique to natural areas called peatlands, bogs, mires, moors, or muskegs. Sphagnum moss, also called peat moss, is one of the most common components in peat, although many other plants can contribute. The biological features of sphagnum mosses act to create a habitat aiding peat formation, a phenomenon termed 'habitat manipulation'. Soils consisting primarily of peat are known as histosols. Peat forms in wetland conditions, where flooding or stagnant water obstructs the flow of oxygen from the atmosphere, slowing the rate of decomposition. Peat properties such as organic matter content and saturated hydraulic conductivity can exhibit high spatial heterogeneity.

Peatlands, particularly bogs, are the primary source of peat; although less common, other wetlands, including fens, pocosins and peat swamp forests, also deposit peat. Landscapes covered in peat are home to specific kinds of plants, including Sphagnum moss, ericaceous shrubs and sedges. (Note: See bog for more information on this aspect of peat.) Because organic matter accumulates over thousands of years, peat deposits provide records of past vegetation and climate by preserving plant remains, such as pollen. This allows the reconstruction of past environments and the study of land-use changes.

Peat is used by gardeners and for horticulture in certain parts of the world, but this is being banned in some places. By volume, there are about 4 trillion cubic metres of peat in the world. Over time, the formation of peat is often the first step in the geological formation of fossil fuels such as coal, particularly low-grade coal such as lignite. The peatland ecosystem covers 3.7 million square kilometres (1.4 million square miles) and is the most efficient carbon sink on the planet, because peatland plants capture carbon dioxide (CO_{2}) naturally released from the peat, maintaining an equilibrium. In natural peatlands, the "annual rate of biomass production is greater than the rate of decomposition", but it takes "thousands of years for peatlands to develop the deposits of 1.5 to 2.3 m [4.9 to 7.5 ft], which is the average depth of the boreal [northern] peatlands", which store around 415 gigatonnes (Gt) of carbon (about 46 times 2019 global CO_{2} emissions). Globally, peat stores up to 550 Gt of carbon, 42% of all soil carbon, which exceeds the carbon stored in all other vegetation types, including the world's forests, although it covers just 3% of the land's surface.

Peat is in principle a renewable source of energy. However, its extraction rate in industrialized countries far exceeds its slow regrowth rate of 1 mm (0.04 in) per year, and it is also reported that peat regrowth takes place only in 30–40% of peatlands. Centuries of burning and draining of peat by humans has released a significant amount of CO_{2} into the atmosphere, contributing to anthropogenic climate change.

== Formation ==
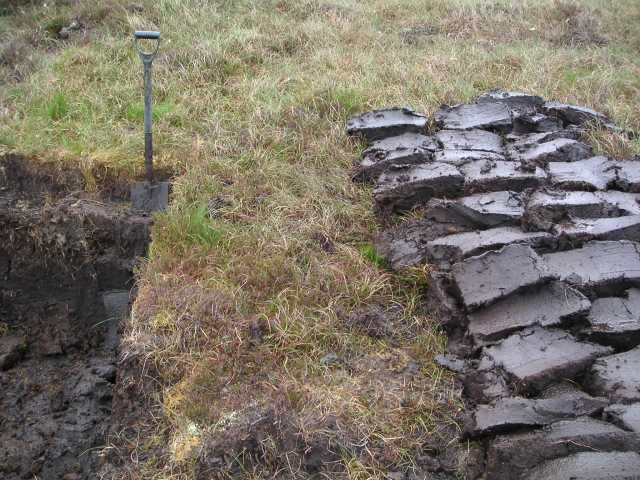
Peat in Lewis, Scotland

Peat forms when plant material does not fully decay in acidic and anaerobic conditions. It is composed mainly of wetland vegetation: principally bog plants including mosses, sedges and shrubs. As it accumulates, the peat holds water. This slowly creates wetter conditions that allow the area of wetland to expand. Peatland features can include ponds, ridges and raised bogs. The characteristics of some bog plants actively promote bog formation. For example, sphagnum mosses actively secrete tannins, which preserve organic material. Sphagnum also have special water-retaining cells, known as hyaline cells, which can release water ensuring the bogland remains constantly wet which helps promote peat production.

Most modern peat bogs formed 12,000 years ago in high latitudes after the glaciers retreated at the end of the last ice age. Peat usually accumulates slowly at the rate of about a millimetre per year. The estimated carbon content is 415 gigatonnes (457 billion short tons) (northern peatlands), 50 Gt (55 billion short tons) (tropical peatlands) and 15 Gt (17 billion short tons) (South America).

== Types of peat material ==
Peat material is either fibric, hemic, or sapric. Fibric peats are the least decomposed and consist of intact fibre. Hemic peats are partially decomposed and sapric are the most decomposed.

Phragmites peat are composed of reed grass, Phragmites australis, and other grasses. It is denser than many other types of peat.

Engineers may describe a soil as peat which has a relatively high percentage of organic material. This soil is problematic because it exhibits poor consolidation properties—it cannot be easily compacted to serve as a stable foundation to support loads, such as roads or buildings.

== Peatlands distribution ==
In a widely cited article, Joosten and Clarke (2002) described peatlands or mires (which they say are the same) (Note: Supported by the "Dutch Ministry of Foreign Affairs (DGIS) under the Global Peatland Initiative, managed by Wetlands International in co-operation with the IUCN – Netherlands Committee, Alterra, the International Mire Conservation Group and the International Peatland Society.") as:

the most widespread of all wetland types in the world, representing 50 to 70% of global wetlands. They cover over 4 million square kilometres [1.5 million square miles] or 3% of the land and freshwater surface of the planet. In these ecosystems are found one third of the world's soil carbon and 10% of global freshwater resources. These ecosystems are characterized by the unique ability to accumulate and store dead organic matter from Sphagnum and many other non-moss species, as peat, under conditions of almost permanent water saturation. Peatlands are adapted to the extreme conditions of high water and low oxygen content, of toxic elements and low availability of plant nutrients. Their water chemistry varies from alkaline to acidic. Peatlands occur on all continents, from the tropical to boreal and Arctic zones from sea level to high alpine conditions.

PEATMAP is a GIS shapefile dataset that shows a distribution of peatlands that spans the entire world.

A more recent estimate from an improved global peatland map, PEATMAP, based on a meta-analysis of geospatial information at global, regional and national levels puts global coverage slightly higher than earlier peatland inventories at 4.23 million square kilometres (1.63 million square miles) approximately 2.84% of the world land area. In Europe, peatlands extend to about 515,000 km^{2} (199,000 sq mi). About 60% of the world's wetlands are made of peat.

Peat deposits are found in many places around the world, including northern Europe and North America. The North American peat deposits are principally found in Canada and the Northern United States. Some of the world's largest peatlands include the West Siberian Lowland, the Hudson Bay Lowlands and the Mackenzie River Valley. There is less peat in the Southern Hemisphere, in part because there is less land. The world's largest tropical peatland is located in Africa (the Democratic Republic of Congo). In South America, the Pastaza-Marañón Foreland Basin in the Peruvian Amazon near Iquitos is the continents largest peatland complex. In addition, the vast Magellanic Moorland in South America (Southern Patagonia/Tierra del Fuego) is an extensive peat-dominated landscape. Peat can be found in New Zealand, Kerguelen, the Falkland Islands and Indonesia (Kalimantan [Sungai Putri, Danau Siawan, Sungai Tolak], Rasau Jaya (West Kalimantan) and Sumatra). Indonesia has more tropical peatlands and mangrove forests than any other nation on earth, but Indonesia is losing wetlands by 100,000 hectares (250,000 acres) per year. A catalog of the peat research collection at the University of Minnesota Duluth provides references to research on worldwide peat and peatlands.

About 7% of all peatlands have been exploited for agriculture and forestry. Under certain conditions, peat will turn into lignite coal over geologic periods of time.

== General uses ==
=== Fuel ===
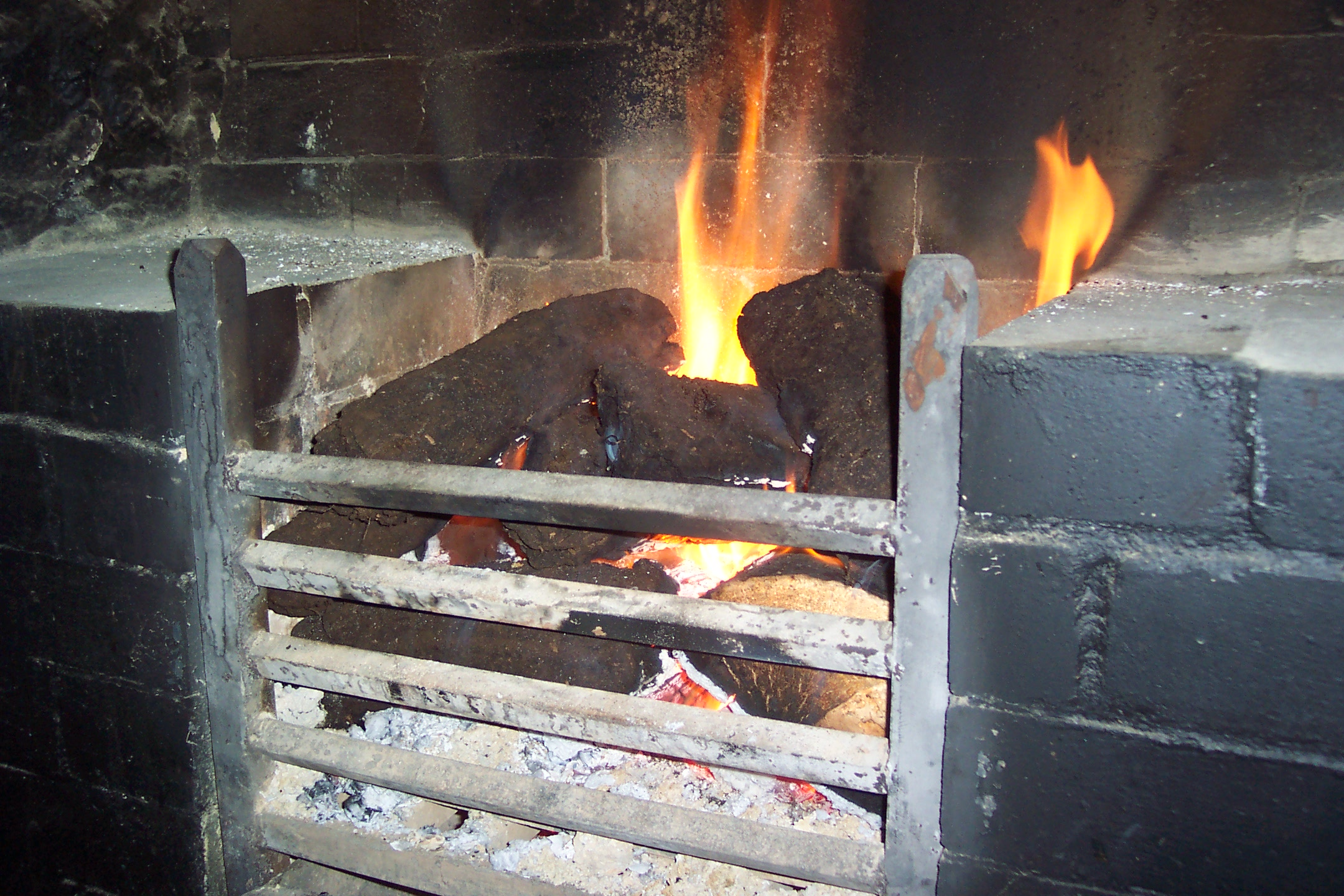
Peat fire

Peat can be used as fuel once dried. Traditionally, peat is cut by hand and left to dry in the sun. In many countries, including Ireland and Scotland, peat was traditionally stacked to dry in rural areas and used for cooking and domestic heating. This tradition can be traced back to the Roman period.

=== Agriculture ===
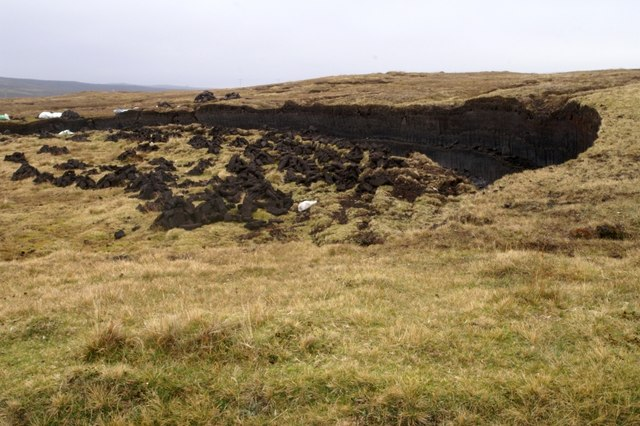
Worked bank in blanket bog, near Ulsta, Yell, Shetland Islands

Peat has been discouraged as a soil additive by the Royal Botanic Gardens, Kew, England, since 2003. While bark or coir-based peat-free potting soil mixes are on the rise, particularly in the UK, peat is still used as raw material for horticulture in some other European countries, Canada, as well as parts of the United States. In controlled environment agriculture peat is often used to make grow cups (that then hold coco coir or other medium), but similarly recent life cycle analysis has shown it is better for the environment to replace them with re-usable plastic cups (peat cups have ~4.5 times higher carbon footprint and 35 % greater energy consumption than single-use plastic cups) .

=== Drinking water ===
Peatland can also be an essential source of drinking water, providing nearly 4% of all potable water stored in reservoirs. In the UK, 43% of the population receives drinking water sourced from peatlands, with the number climbing to 68% in Ireland. Catchments containing peatlands are the main source of water for large cities, including Dublin.

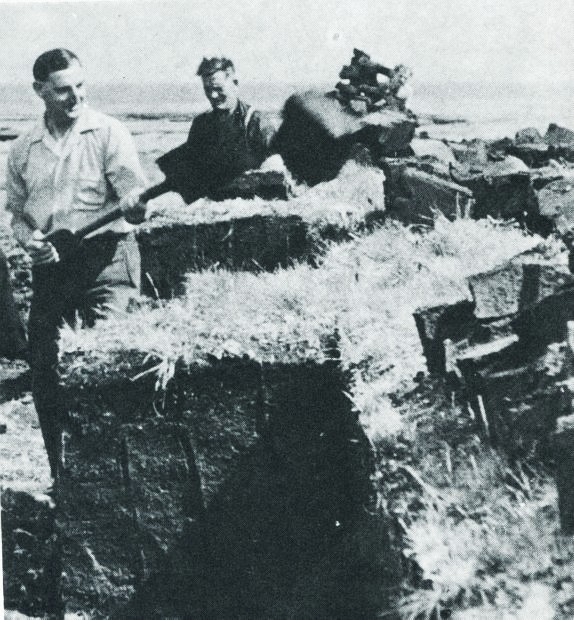
Falkland Islanders shovelling peat in the 1950s

=== Metallurgy ===
Peat wetlands also used to have a degree of metallurgical importance in the Early Middle Ages, being the primary source of bog iron used to create swords and armour.

=== Flood mitigation ===
Many peat swamps along the coast of Malaysia serve as a natural means of flood mitigation, with any overflow being absorbed by the peat, provided forests are still present to prevent peat fires.

=== Freshwater aquaria ===
Peat is sometimes used in freshwater aquaria. It is seen most commonly in soft water or blackwater river systems such as those mimicking the Amazon River basin. In addition to being soft and therefore suitable for demersal (bottom-dwelling) species such as Corydoras catfish, peat is reported to have many other beneficial functions in freshwater aquaria. It softens water by acting as an ion exchanger; it also contains substances that are beneficial for plants and fishes' reproductive health. Peat can prevent algae growth and kill microorganisms. Peat often stains the water yellow or brown due to the leaching of tannins.

=== Balneotherapy ===
Peat is widely used in balneotherapy (the use of bathing to treat disease). Many traditional spa treatments include peat as part of peloids. Such health treatments have an enduring tradition in European countries, including Poland, the Czech Republic, Germany and Austria. Some of these old spas date back to the 18th century and are still active today. The most common types of peat application in balneotherapy are peat muds, poultices and suspension baths.

=== Peat archives ===
Authors Rydin and Jeglum in Biology of Habitats described the concept of peat archives, a phrase coined by influential peatland scientist Harry Godwin in 1981.

In a peat profile there is a fossilized record of changes over time in the vegetation, pollen, spores, animals (from microscopic to the giant elk), and archaeological remains that have been deposited in place, as well as pollen, spores and particles brought in by wind and weather. These remains are collectively termed the peat archives.

— Rydin, 2013

In Quaternary Palaeoecology, first published in 1980, Birks and Birks described how paleoecological studies "of peat can be used to reveal what plant communities were present (locally and regionally), what period each community occupied, how environmental conditions changed, and how the environment affected the ecosystem in that time and place."

Scientists continue to compare modern mercury (Hg) accumulation rates in bogs with historical natural archives records in peat bogs and lake sediments to estimate the potential human impacts on the biogeochemical cycle of mercury, for example. Over the years, different dating models and technologies for measuring date sediments and peat profiles accumulated over the last 100–150 years, have been used, including the widely used vertical distribution of 210Pb, the inductively coupled plasma mass spectrometry (ICP-SMS), and more recently the initial penetration (IP).

==== Bog bodies ====
Naturally mummified human bodies, often called "bog bodies" have been found in various places in Scotland, England, Ireland, and especially northern Germany and Denmark. They are almost perfectly preserved by the tanning properties of the acidic water, as well as by the antibiotic properties of the organic component sphagnan. A famous example is the Tollund Man in Denmark. Having been discovered in 1950 after being mistaken for a recent murder victim, he was exhumed for scientific purposes and dated to have lived during the 4th century BC. Before that, another bog body, the Elling Woman, had been discovered in 1938 in the same bog about 60 metres (200 ft) from the Tollund Man. She is believed to have lived during the late 3rd century BC and was a ritual sacrifice. In the Bronze and Iron Ages, people used peat bogs for rituals to nature gods and spirits.

== Environmental and ecological issues ==
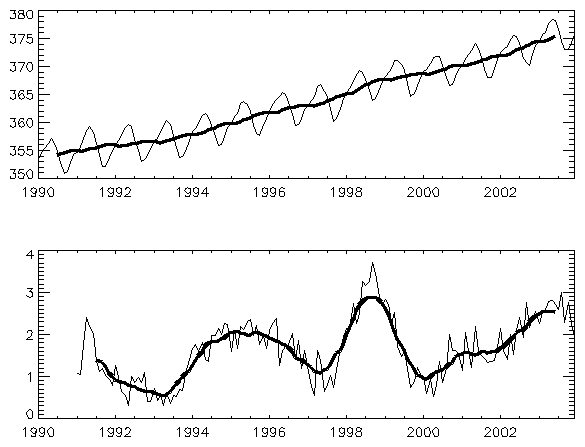
Increase, and change relative to previous year, of the atmospheric concentration of carbon dioxide

The distinctive ecological conditions of peat wetlands provide a habitat for distinctive fauna and flora. For example, whooping cranes nest in North American peatlands, whilst Siberian cranes nest in the West Siberian peatland. Palsa mires have a rich bird life and are an EU-red listed habitat, and in Canada riparian peat banks are used as maternity sites for polar bears. Natural peatlands also have many species of wild orchids and carnivorous plants. For more on biological communities, see wetland, bog or fen.

Around half of the area of northern peatlands is permafrost-affected, and this area represents around a tenth of the total permafrost area, and also a tenth (185 ± 66 Gt) of all permafrost carbon, equivalent to around half of the carbon stored in the atmosphere. Dry peat is a good insulator (with a thermal conductivity of around 0.25 Wm^{−1}K^{−1}) and therefore plays an important role in protecting permafrost from thaw. The insulating effect of dry peat also makes it integral to unique permafrost landforms such as palsas and permafrost peat plateaus. Peatland permafrost thaw tends to result in an increase in methane emissions and a small increase in carbon dioxide uptake, meaning that it contributes to the permafrost carbon feedback. Under 2 °C global warming, 0.7 million km^{2} of peatland permafrost could thaw, and with warming of +1.5 to 6 °C a cumulative 0.7 to 3 PgC of methane could be released as a result of permafrost peatland thaw by 2100. The forcing from these potential emissions would be approximately equivalent to 1% of projected anthropogenic emissions.

One characteristic of peat is the bioaccumulation of metals concentrated in the peat. Accumulated mercury is of significant environmental concern.

=== Peat drainage ===
Large areas of organic wetland (peat) soils are currently drained for agriculture, forestry and peat extraction (i.e. through canals). This process is taking place all over the world. This not only destroys the habitat of many species but also heavily fuels climate change. As a result of peat drainage, the organic carbon—which built over thousands of years and is normally underwater—is suddenly exposed to the air. It decomposes and turns into carbon dioxide (CO_{2}), which is released into the atmosphere. Globally about 12% of current peatlands have been drained and damaged. As of 2022 they are estimated to emit 4% of human made greenhouse gases, not including fires.

=== Peat fires ===
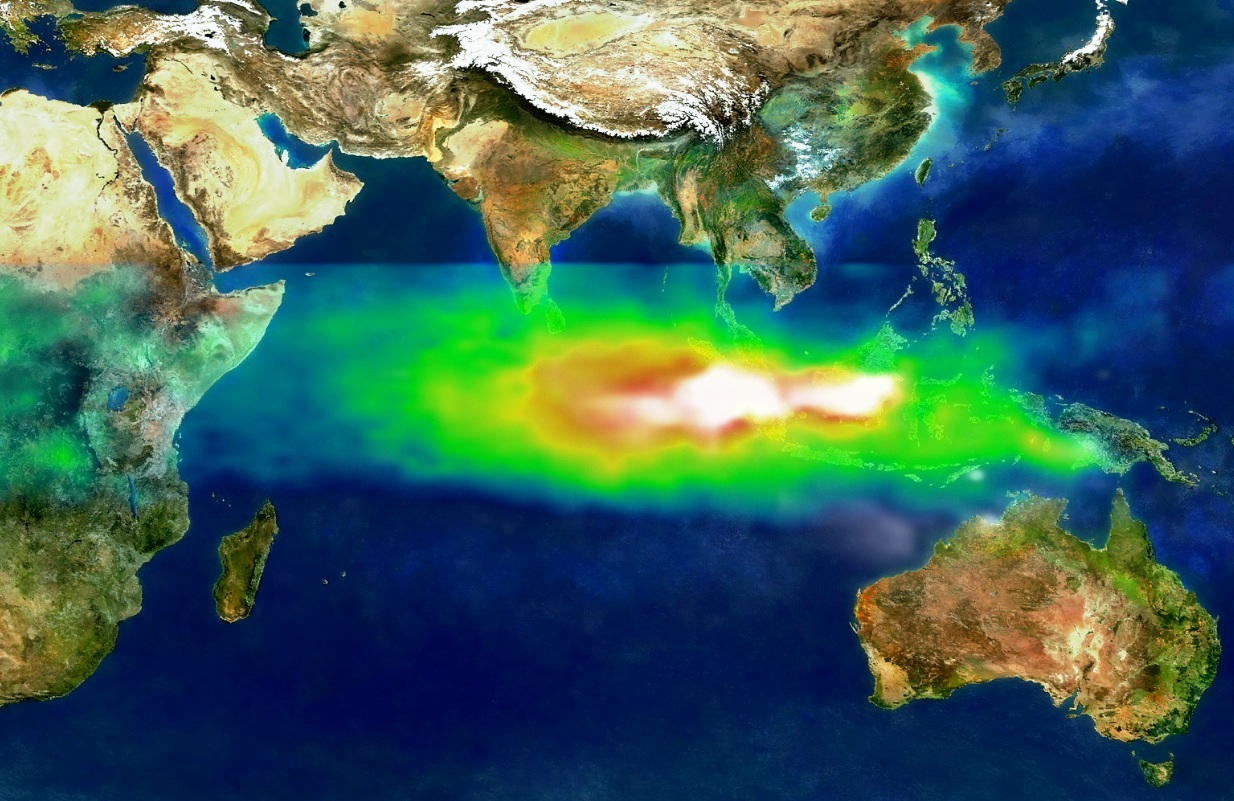
Smoke and ozone pollution from Indonesian fires, 1997

Peat can be a major fire hazard and is not extinguished by light rain. Peat fires may burn for great lengths of time, or smoulder underground and reignite after winter if an oxygen source is present.

Peat has a high carbon content and can burn under low moisture conditions. Once ignited by the presence of a heat source (e.g., a wildfire penetrating the subsurface), it smoulders. These smouldering fires can burn undetected for very long periods of time (months, years, and even centuries) propagating in a creeping fashion through the underground peat layer.

Despite the damage that the burning of raw peat can cause, bogs are naturally subject to wildfires and depend on the wildfires to keep woody competition from lowering the water table and shading out many bog plants. Several families of plants including the carnivorous Sarracenia (trumpet pitcher), Dionaea (Venus flytrap), Utricularia (bladderworts) and non-carnivorous plants such as the sandhills lily, toothache grass and many species of orchid are now threatened and in some cases endangered from the combined forces of human drainage, negligence and absence of fire.

The recent burning of peat bogs in Indonesia, with their large and deep growths containing more than 50 billion tonnes (55 billion short tons; 49 billion long tons) of carbon, has contributed to increases in world carbon dioxide levels. Peat deposits in Southeast Asia could be destroyed by 2040.

It is estimated that in 1997, peat and forest fires in Indonesia released between 0.81 and 2.57 gigatonnes (0.89 and 2.83 billion short tons; 0.80 and 2.53 billion long tons) of carbon; equivalent to 13–40 percent of the amount released by global fossil fuel burning, and greater than the carbon uptake of the world's biosphere. These fires may be responsible for the acceleration in the increase in carbon dioxide levels since 1998. More than 100 peat fires in Kalimantan and East Sumatra have continued to burn since 1997; each year, these peat fires ignite new forest fires above the ground.

In North America, peat fires can occur during severe droughts throughout their occurrence, from boreal forests in Canada to swamps and fens in the subtropical southern Florida Everglades. Once a fire has burnt through the area, hollows in the peat are burnt out, and hummocks are desiccated but can contribute to Sphagnum recolonization.

In the summer of 2010, an unusually high heat wave of up to 40 °C (104 °F) ignited large deposits of peat in Central Russia, burning thousands of houses and covering the capital of Moscow with a toxic smoke blanket. The situation remained critical until the end of August 2010.

In June 2019, despite some forest fire prevention methods being put in place, peat fires in the Arctic emitted 50 megatonnes (55 million short tons; 49 million long tons) of CO_{2}, which is equal to Sweden's total annual emissions. The peat fires are linked to climate change, as they are much more likely to occur nowadays due to this effect.

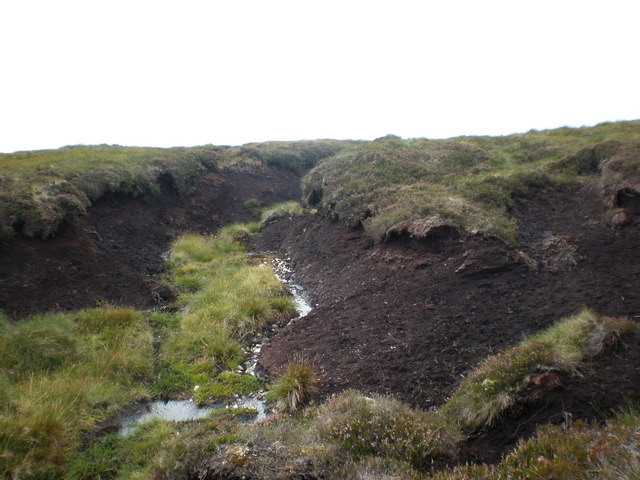
Peat hags in the Scottish Highlands

=== Erosion: peat hags ===
Peat "hags" are a form of erosion which occurs at the sides of gullies that cut into the peat; they sometimes also occur in isolation. Hags may result when flowing water cuts downwards into the peat and when fire or overgrazing exposes the peat surface. Once the peat is exposed in these ways, it is prone to further erosion by wind, water and livestock. The result is overhanging vegetation and peat. Hags are too steep and unstable for vegetation to establish itself, so they continue to erode unless restorative action is taken.

=== Reduced usage ===
Peat-free options and policies have been adopted in various countries, for example the UK's Royal Horticultural Society promotes peat-free gardening. Peat extraction has been forbidden in Chile since April 2024.

== Protection ==
The United Nations Convention on Biological Diversity highlights peatlands as key ecosystems to be conserved and protected. The convention requires governments at all levels to present action plans for the conservation and management of wetland environments. Wetlands are also protected under the 1971 Ramsar Convention.

In June 2002, the United Nations Development Programme launched the Wetlands Ecosystem and Tropical Peat Swamp Forest Rehabilitation Project. This project was targeted to last for five years, and brings together the efforts of various non-government organisations.

In November 2002, the International Peatland (formerly Peat) Society (IPS) and the International Mire Conservation Group (IMCG) published guidelines on the "Wise Use of Mires and Peatlands – Backgrounds and Principles including a framework for decision-making". This publication aims to develop mechanisms that can balance the conflicting demands on the global peatland heritage to ensure its wise use to meet the needs of humankind.

In June 2008, the IPS published the book Peatlands and Climate Change, summarising the currently available knowledge on the topic. In 2010, IPS presented a "Strategy for Responsible Peatland Management", which can be applied worldwide for decision-making. In 2019, the IPS published a summary on "International Conventions, Agencies, Agreements and Programmes," which covers the activities of 22 international organisations that have some relevance to peatlands and peat.

== Restoration ==
Often, restoration is done by blocking drainage channels in the peatland, and allowing natural vegetation to recover. Rehabilitation projects undertaken in North America and Europe usually focus on the rewetting of peatlands and revegetation of native species. This acts to mitigate carbon release in the short term before the new growth of vegetation provides a new source of organic litter to fuel the peat formation in the long term. UNEP is supporting peatland restoration in Indonesia.

Active peatland plant reintroduction successfully re-establishes typical plant communities within 5 years after restoration. These support the return of animal, insect, and bird communities found in undisturbed similar environments. The presence of pools in restoration projects increases the biodiversity by providing a variety of microhabitats.

== Characteristics and uses by nation ==
=== Latvia ===
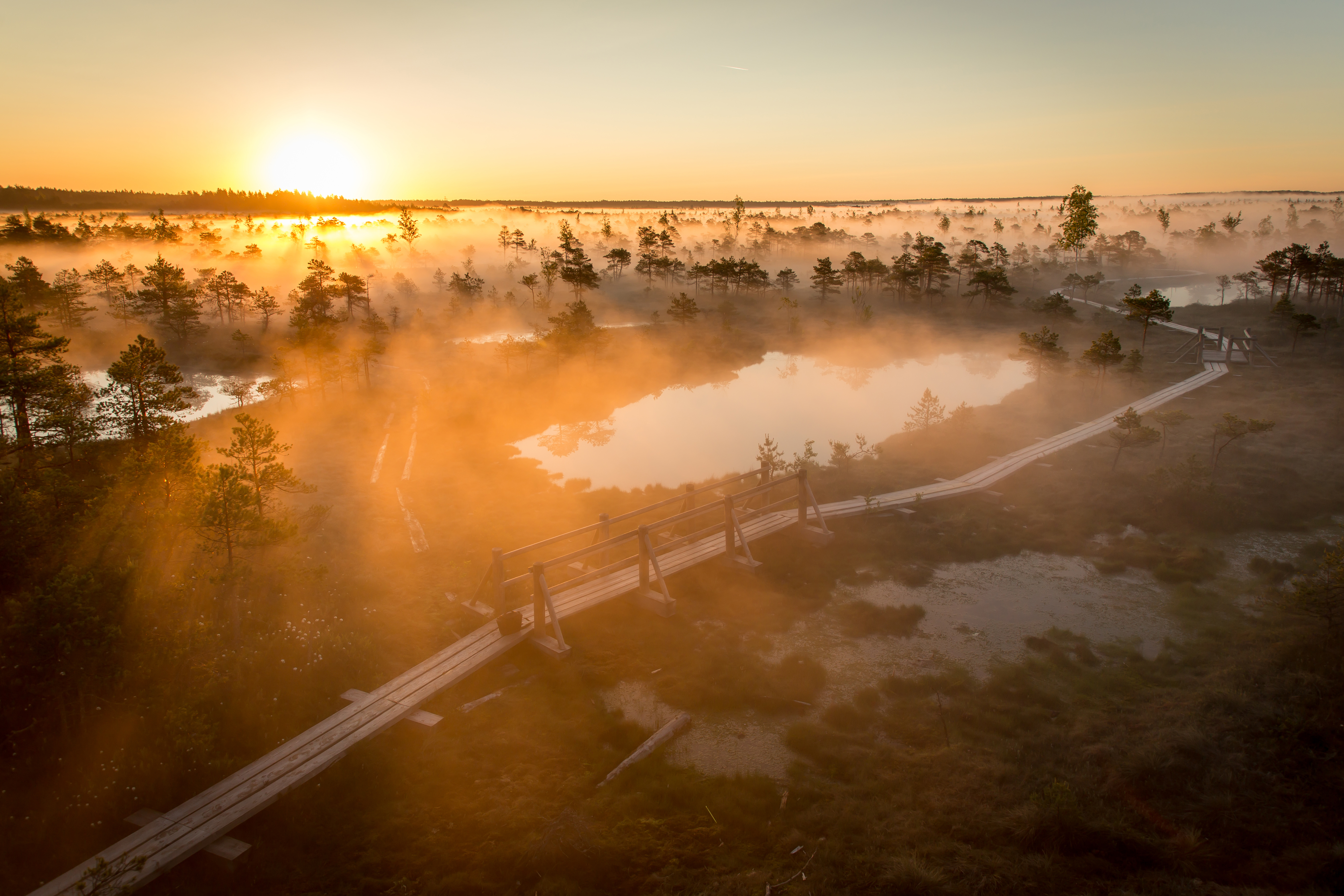
Ķemeri bog at sunset

Latvia has been the biggest exporter of peat in the world by volume, providing more than 19.9% of the world's volume, followed only by Canada with 13% in 2022. In 2020, Latvia exported 1.97 million tons of peat, followed by Germany with 1.5 and Canada with 1.42 million tons. Nevertheless, although first in the world by volume, in monetary terms, Latvian comes second in the world behind Canada. As an example, Latvia's income from exports was US$237 million.

Latvia's peat deposits have been estimated to equal 1.7 billion tons. Due to its climate, Latvia has several peat bogs, which account for 9.9% of the country's territory.

More than two thirds of the licensed areas for peat extraction are state-owned; 55% belong to the state whilst 23% belong to the municipalities

Bogs in Latvia are considered important habitats due to their ecological values, and up to 128,000 hectares, or 40% of the areas in the territory, are protected by environmental laws. The most famous national parks and reserves are the Ķemeri National Park, Cenas tīrelis and Teiči Nature Reserve.

=== Finland ===
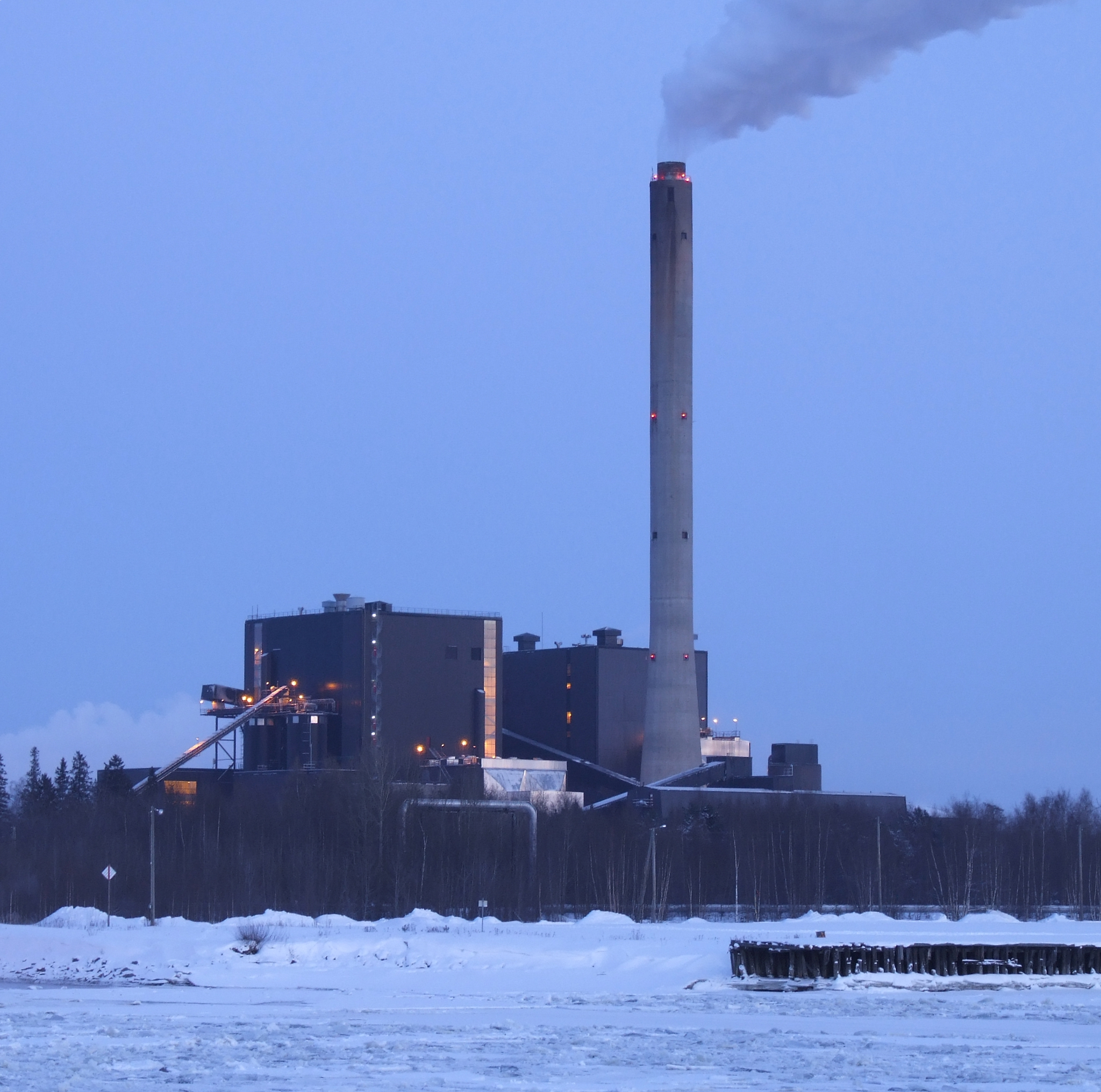
The Toppila Power Station, a peat-fired facility in Oulu, Finland

The climate, geography and environment of Finland favours bog and peat bog formation. Thus, peat is available in considerable quantities. It is burned to produce heat and electricity. Peat provides around 4% of Finland's annual energy production.

Also, agricultural and forestry-drained peat bogs actively release more CO_{2} annually than is released in peat energy production in Finland. The average regrowth rate of a single peat bog, however, is indeed slow, from 1,000 up to 5,000 years. Furthermore, it is a common practice to forest used peat bogs instead of giving them a chance to renew. This leads to lower levels of CO_{2} storage than the original peat bog.

At 106 g CO_{2}/MJ, the carbon dioxide emissions of peat are higher than those of coal (at 94.6 g CO_{2}/MJ) and natural gas (at 56.1). According to one study, increasing the average amount of wood in the fuel mixture from the current 2.6% to 12.5% would take the emissions down to 93 g CO_{2}/MJ. That said, little effort is being made to achieve this.

The International Mire Conservation Group (IMCG) in 2006 urged the local and national governments of Finland to protect and conserve the remaining pristine peatland ecosystems. This includes the cessation of drainage and peat extraction in intact mire sites and the abandoning of current and planned groundwater extraction that may affect these sites. A proposal for a Finnish peatland management strategy was presented to the government in 2011, after a lengthy consultation phase.

=== Sweden ===
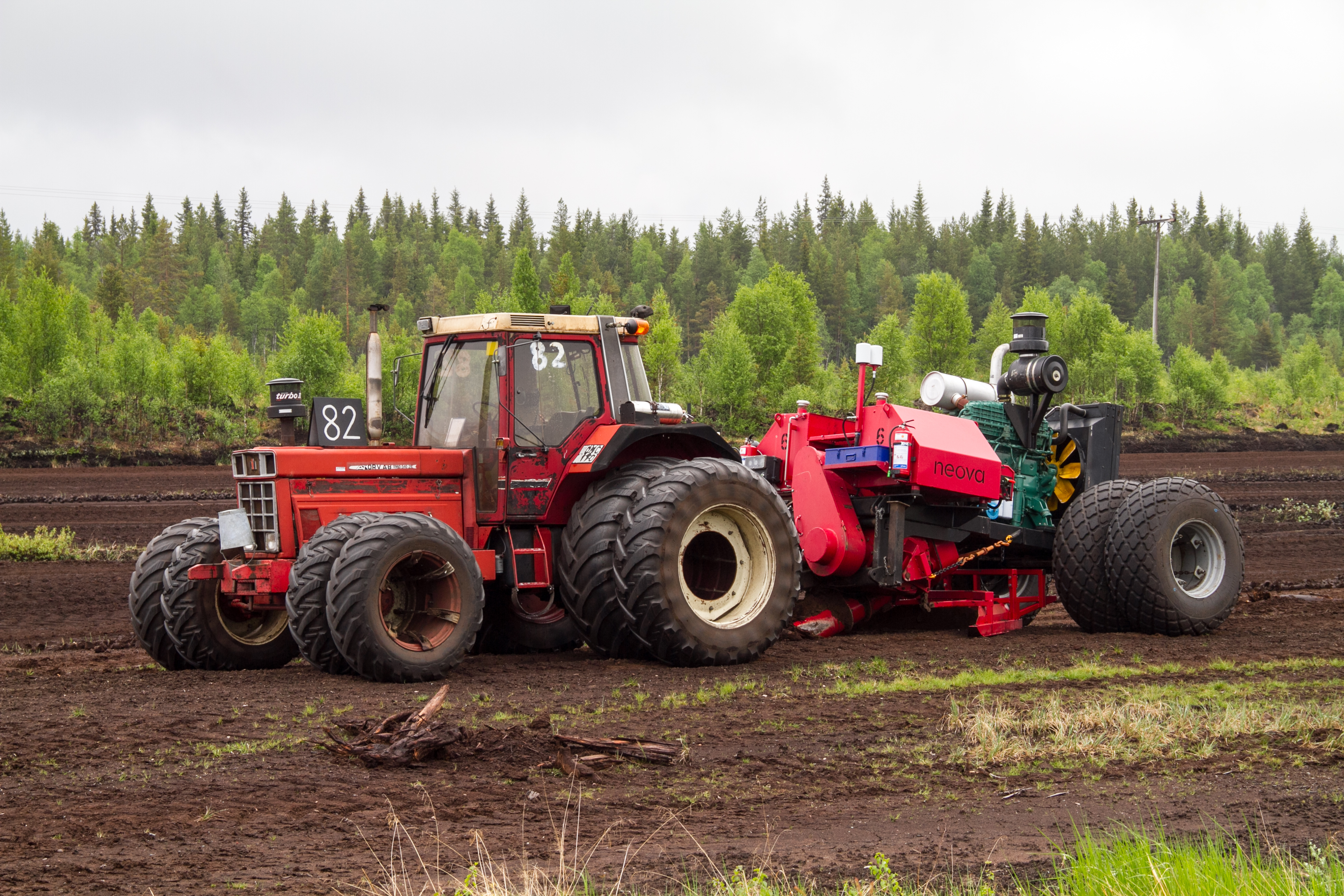
Tractor used for peat cutting in Saltmyran, Arvidsjaur, Sweden

About 15% of the land in Sweden is covered by peatlands. Whilst nowadays the main use of such soils is for forestry, peat-rich lands have historically been exploited to produce energy, agricultural land and horticultural substrates. The most common method to extract peat during the 19th and 20th centuries was peat cutting, a process where the land is cleared of forest and subsequently drained. Peat cores are then extracted under dry weather conditions and stored on stacks to let the residual moisture evaporate. Today, clear-cutting for horticultural peat (of which Sweden is an important producer in Europe) is limited to some areas of Sweden and strictly regulated by the Swedish Environmental Code to prevent that significant groundwater storages and carbon sinks areas are altered and compromised by human activities. At the same time, restoration of drained peatlands through rewetting is urged by national and international policies to exploit the peat-rich soil properties in mitigating climate change effects.

=== Ireland ===
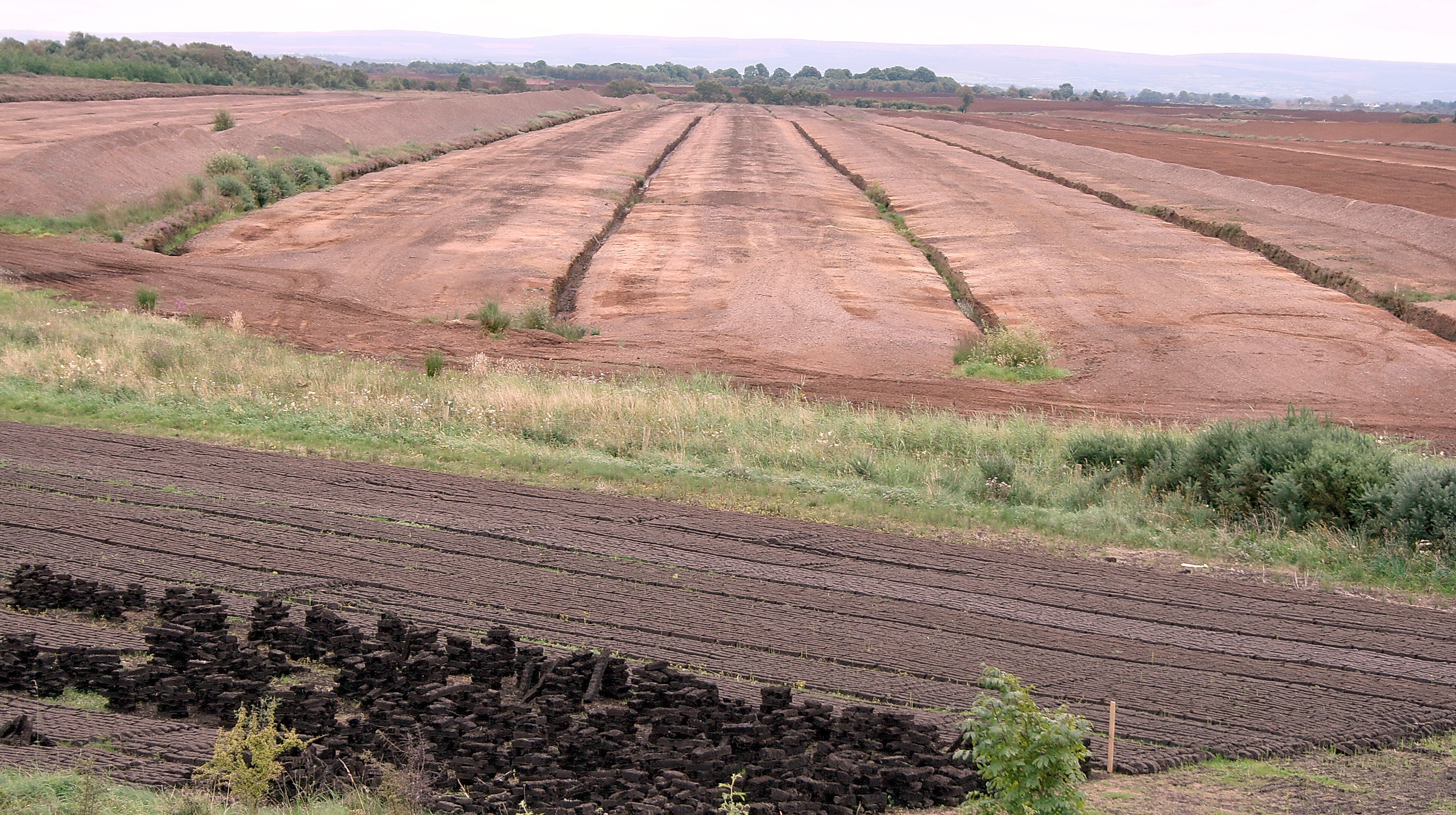
Industrial-milled peat production in a section of the Bog of Allen in the Irish Midlands: The 'turf' in the foreground is machine-produced for domestic use.

In Ireland, a state-owned company called Bord na Móna was responsible for managing peat extraction. It processed the extracted peat into milled peat used in power stations and sold processed peat fuel in the form of peat briquettes, which is used for domestic heating. These are oblong bars of densely compressed, dried, and shredded peat. Peat moss is a manufactured product for garden cultivation. Turf (dried-out peat sods) is also commonly used in rural areas.

In January 2021, Bord na Móna announced that it had ceased all peat harvesting and cutting operations and would move its business to a climate solutions company.

In 2022, selling peat for burning was prohibited, but some people are still allowed to cut and burn it.

=== Russia ===
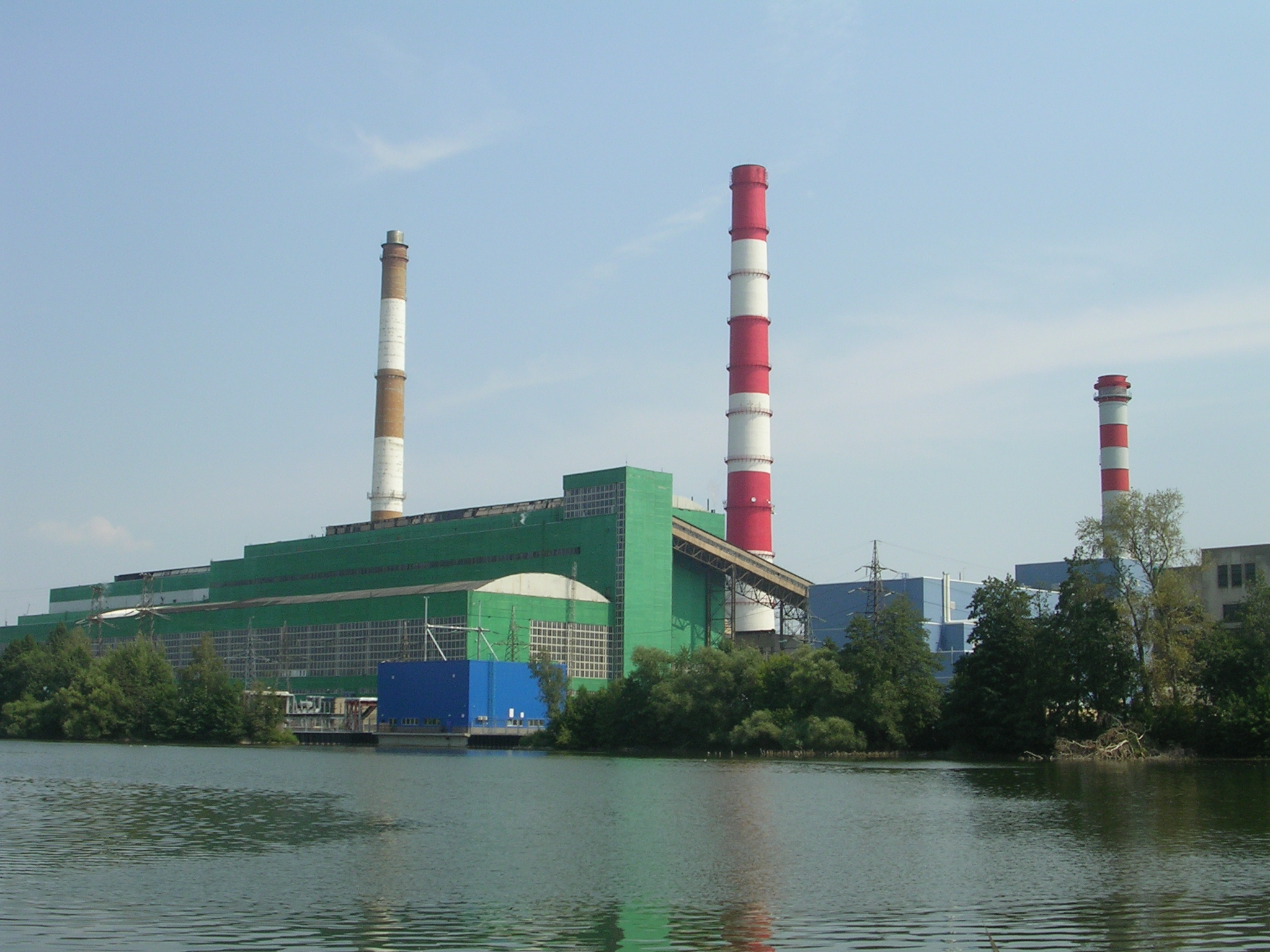
Shatura Power Station. Russia has the largest peat power capacity in the world.

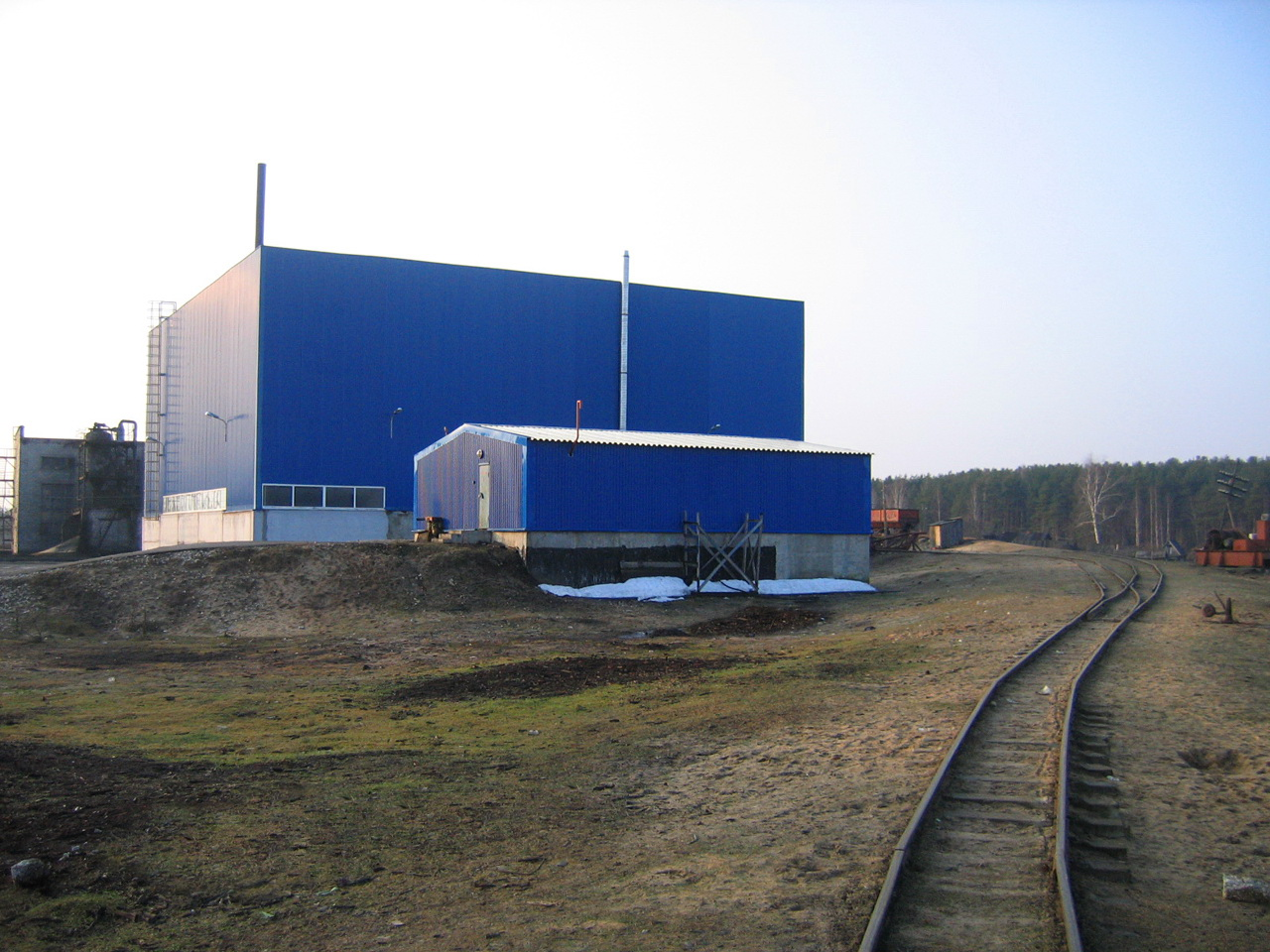
The Bor Peat Briquette Factory, Russia

The use of peat for energy production was prominent in the Soviet Union, especially in 1965. In 1929, over 40% of the Soviet Union's electric energy came from peat, which dropped to 1% by 1980.

In the 1960s, larger sections of swamps and bogs in Western Russia were drained for agricultural and mining purposes.

=== Netherlands ===
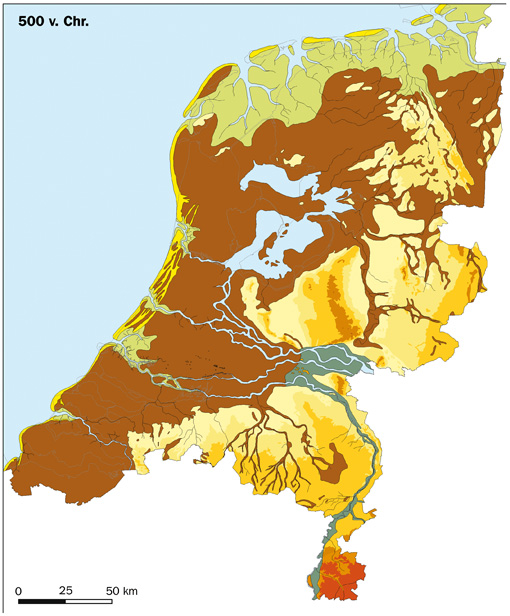
Peat covered area (brown) 2,500 years ago in the Netherlands

Two-and-a-half thousand years ago, the area now named the Netherlands was largely covered with peat. Drainage, causing compaction and oxidation and excavation have reduced peatlands (>40 cm [16 in] peat) to about 2,733 km^{2} (1,055 sq mi) or 10% of the land area, mostly used as meadows. Drainage and excavation have lowered the surface of the peatlands. In the west of the country, dikes and mills were built, creating polders so that dwelling and economic activities could continue below sea level, the first polder probably in 1533 and the last one in 1968. Peat harvesting could continue in suitable locations as the lower layers below the current sea level are exposed. This peat was deposited before the sea level rise in the Holocene. As a result, approximately 26% of the area and 21% of the population of the Netherlands are presently below sea level. The deepest point is in the Zuidplaspolder, 6.76 m (22.2 ft) below average sea level.

The Netherlands compared to sea level

In 2020, the Netherlands imported 2,156 million kg of peat (5.39 million m^{3} [400 kg/m^{3} dry peat]): 44.5% from Germany (2020), 9.5% from Estonia (2018), 9.2% from Latvia (2020), 7.2% from Ireland (2018), 8.0% from Sweden (2019), 6.5% from Lithuania (2020), 5.1% from Belgium (2019) and 1.7% from Denmark (2019); 1.35 million kg was exported. Most is used in gardening and greenhouse horticulture.

Since the Netherlands did not have many trees to use as firewood or charcoal, one use the Dutch made of the available peat was to fire kilns to make pottery. During World War II, the Dutch Resistance came up with an unusual use for peat. Since peat was so available in the fields, resistance fighters sometimes stacked peat into human-sized piles and used the piles for target practice.

=== Estonia ===
After oil shale, peat is the second-most-mined natural resource in Estonia. The peat production sector has a yearly revenue of around €100 million and it is mostly export-oriented. Peat is extracted from around 14 hectares (35 acres).

=== India ===
==== Sikkim ====
The mountains of the Himalayas and Tibetan Plateau contain pockets of high-altitude wetlands. Khecheopalri is one of the eastern Indian territory of Sikkim's most famous and diverse peatlands, with 682 species representing five kingdoms, 196 families and 453 genera.

=== United Kingdom ===
In 1999, the UK government set a target for the country's horticulture industry to become 90% peat-free by 2010. A number of environmental and horticultural organisations, coming together as the "Peat-free Partnership", have argued that legislation is needed to ban the sale of peat and products containing peat.

==== England ====
England has around 1 million acres of peatland. Peatlands in England store 584m tonnes of carbon in total but emit around 11 million tonnes of CO_{2} every year due to degradation and draining. In 2021 only 124 people owned 60% of England's peatland.

The extraction of peat from the Somerset Levels began during the Roman times and has been carried out since the Levels were first drained. On Dartmoor, there were several commercial distillation plants formed and run by the British Patent Naphtha Company in 1844. These produced naphtha on a commercial scale from the high-quality local peat.

Fenn's, Whixall and Bettisfield Mosses is an element of a post-Ice Age peat bog that straddles the England–Wales border and contains many rare plant and animal species due to the acidic environment created by the peat. Only lightly hand-dug, it is now a national nature reserve and is being restored to its natural condition.

The industrial extraction of peat occurred at the Thorne Moor site, outside Doncaster near the village of Hatfield. Government policy incentivised commercial removal to peat for agricultural use. This caused much destruction of the area during the 1980s. The removal of the peat resulted in later flooding further downstream at Goole due to the loss of water retaining peatlands. Recently regeneration of peatland has occurred as part of the Thorne Moors project, and at Fleet Moss, organised by Yorkshire Wildlife Trust.

==== Northern Ireland ====
In Northern Ireland, there is small-scale domestic turf cutting in rural areas, but areas of bogs have been diminished because of changes in agriculture. In response, afforestation has seen the establishment of tentative steps towards conservation such as Peatlands Park, County Armagh which is an Area of Special Scientific Interest.

==== Scotland ====
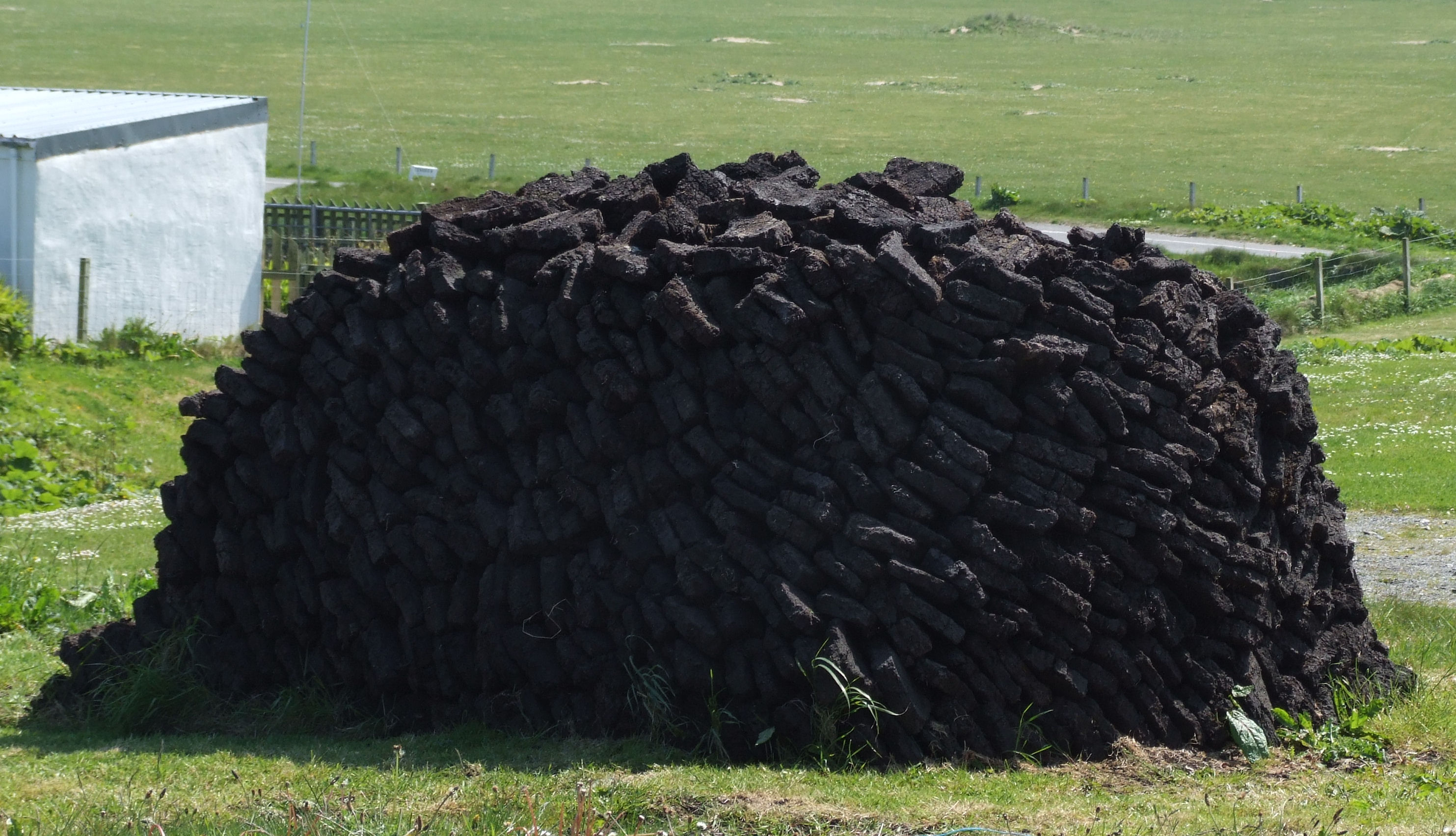
A peat stack in Ness on the Isle of Lewis (Scotland)

Some Scotch whisky distilleries, such as those on Islay, use peat fires to dry malted barley. The drying process takes about 30 hours. This gives the whiskies a distinctive smoky flavour, often called "peatiness". The peatiness, or degree of peat flavour, of a whisky is calculated in ppm of phenol. Normal Highland whiskies have a peat level of up to 30 ppm, and the whiskies on Islay usually have up to 50 ppm. In rare types like the Octomore, the whisky can have more than 100 ppm of phenol. Scotch Ales can also use peat-roasted malt, imparting a similar smoked flavor.

Because they are easily compressed under minimal weight, peat deposits pose significant difficulties for building structures, roads and railways. When the West Highland railway line was constructed across Rannoch Moor in western Scotland, its builders had to float the tracks on a multi-thousand-ton mattress of tree roots, brushwood, earth and ash.

==== Wales ====
Wales has over 70,000 hectares of peatlands. Most of it is blanket peat bog in the highlands, but there are a few hundred hectares of peatland in lowland areas. Some peatland areas in Wales are in poor condition. In 2020, the Welsh Government established a five-year peatland restoration initiative, which will be implemented by Natural Resources Wales (NRW).

=== Canada ===
There are 294 million acres of peatland in Canada, with approximately 43,500 acres in production and another 34,500 acres involved in past production. The current and past acreage in production amounts to 0.03 percent of Canada's peatland. Canada is the top exporter of peat by value. In 2021, top exporters of peat (including peat litter), whether or not agglomerated, were Canada ($580,591.39K, 1,643,950,000 kg), European Union ($445,304.42K, 2,362,280,000 kg), Latvia ($275,459.14K, 2,184,860,000 kg), Netherlands ($235,250.84K, 1,312,850,000 kg), Germany ($223,414.66K, 1,721,170,000 kg).

== See also ==
- Acid sulfate soil
- Acrotelm
- Climate change mitigation#Preserving and enhancing carbon sinks
- Gyttja
- Histosol
- Irish Peatland Conservation Council
- Lindow Man, also known as "Pete Marsh"
- List of bogs
- Peat Cutting Monday
- Tropical peat
- Turbary
- Unified Soil Classification System
- Category:Peat-fired power stations
