= Dissolved organic carbon =

Organic carbon classification

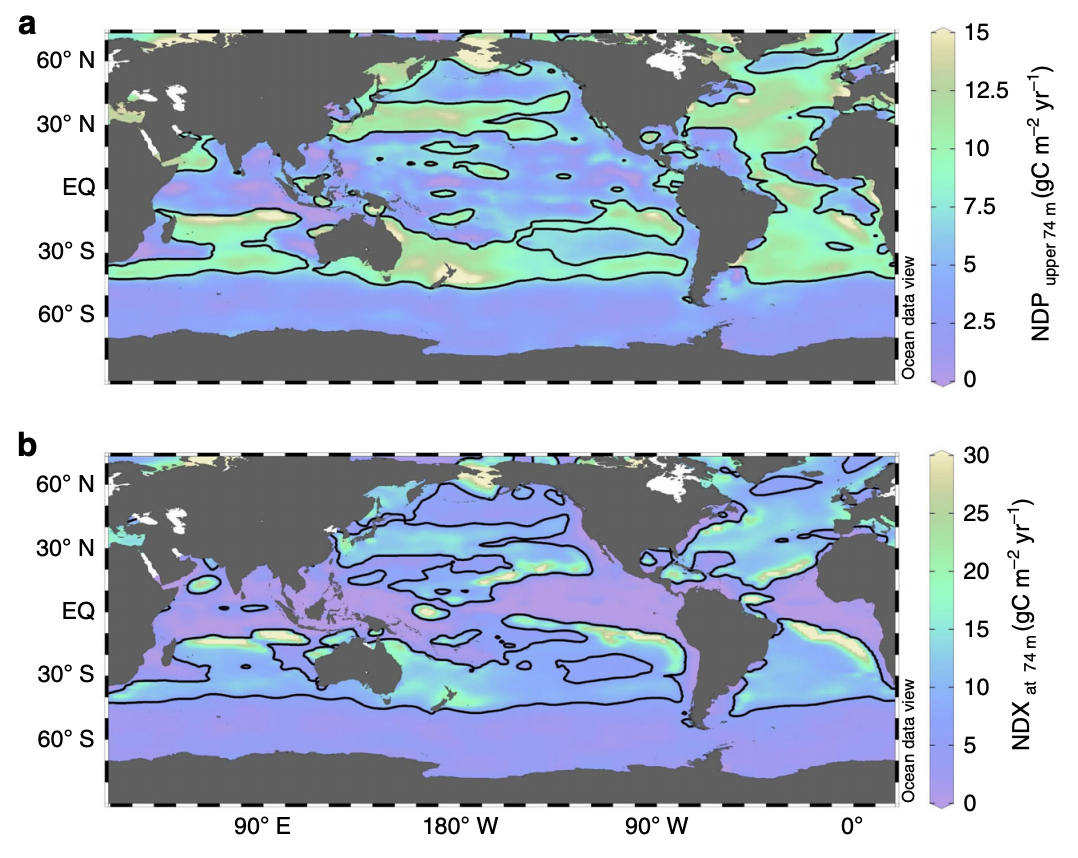
Net ocean DOC production and export fluxes Net DOC production (NDP) in the upper 74 metres (a) and net DOC export (NDX) below 74 metres (b). At steady state, the global summation of NDX is equal to that of NDP, and is 2.31 ± 0.60 PgC yr.

Dissolved organic carbon (DOC) is the fraction of organic carbon operationally defined as that which can pass through a filter with a pore size typically between 0.22 and 0.7 micrometers. The fraction remaining on the filter is called particulate organic carbon (POC).

Dissolved organic matter (DOM) is a closely related term often used interchangeably with DOC. While DOC refers specifically to the mass of carbon in the dissolved organic material, DOM refers to the total mass of the dissolved organic matter. So DOM also includes the mass of other elements present in the organic material, such as nitrogen, oxygen and hydrogen. DOC is a component of DOM and there is typically about twice as much DOM as DOC. Many statements that can be made about DOC apply equally to DOM, and vice versa.

DOC is abundant in marine and freshwater systems and is one of the greatest cycled reservoirs of organic matter on Earth, accounting for the same amount of carbon as in the atmosphere and up to 20% of all organic carbon. In general, organic carbon compounds are the result of decomposition processes from dead organic matter including plants and animals. DOC can originate from within or outside any given body of water. DOC originating from within the body of water is known as autochthonous DOC and typically comes from aquatic plants or algae, while DOC originating outside the body of water is known as allochthonous DOC and typically comes from soils or terrestrial plants. When water originates from land areas with a high proportion of organic soils, these components can drain into rivers and lakes as DOC.

The marine DOC pool is important for the functioning of marine ecosystems because they are at the interface between the chemical and the biological worlds. DOC fuels marine food webs, and is a major component of the Earth's carbon cycling.

== Overview ==
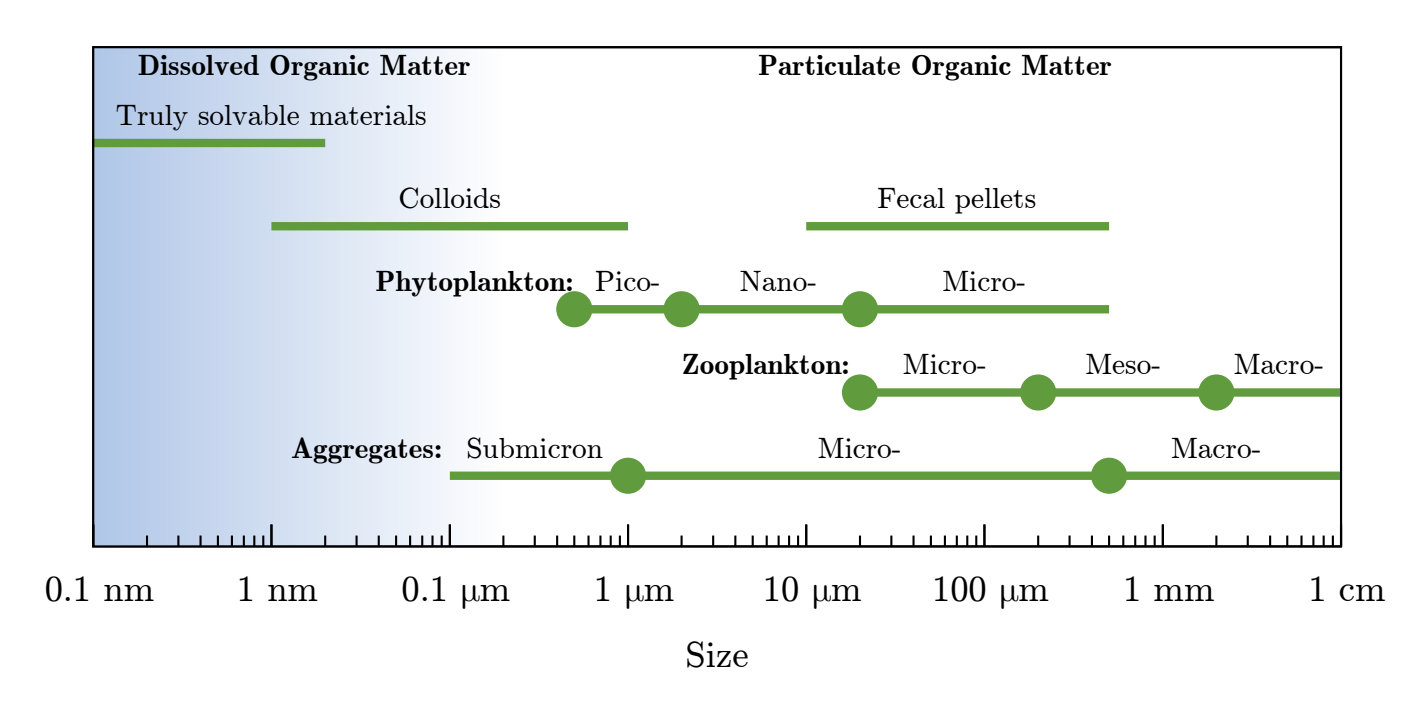
Size and classification of marine particles Adapted from Simon et al., 2002.

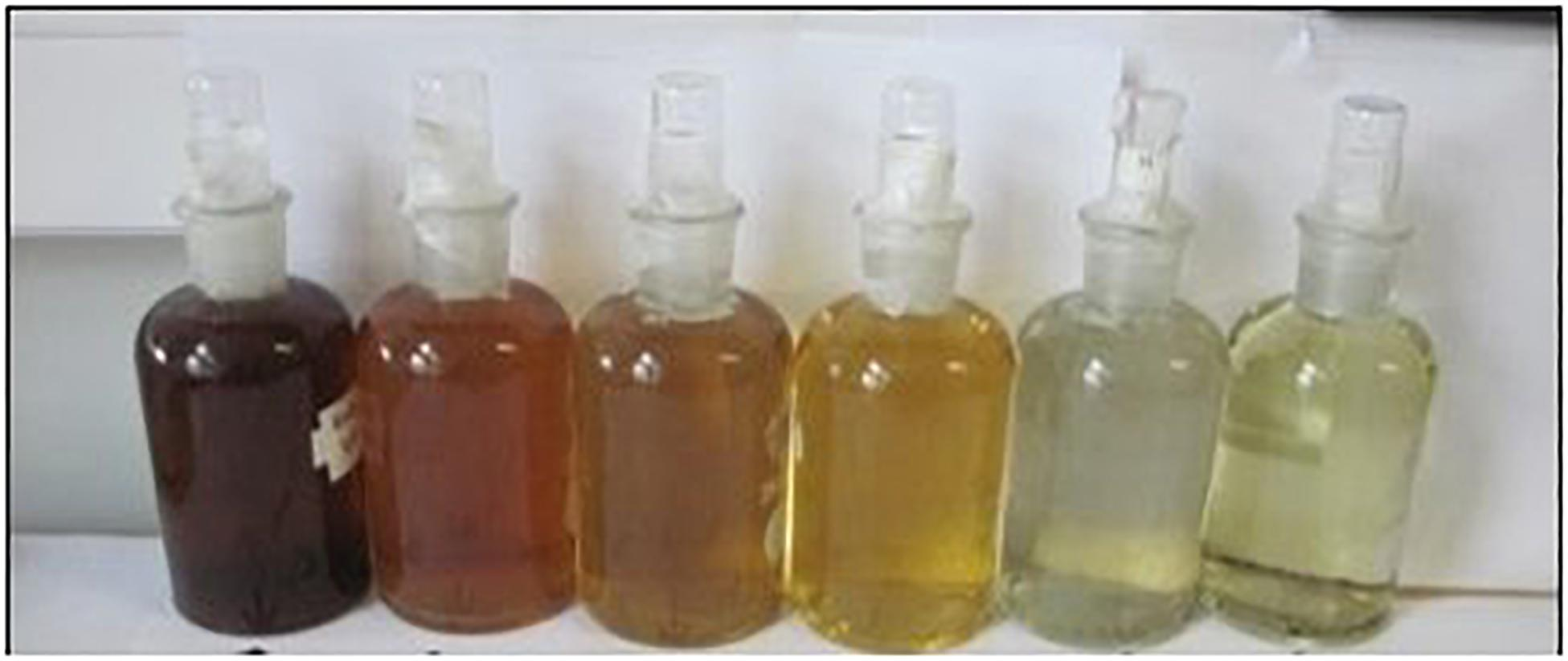
Colour differences in DOC collected from coastal waters Filtered (0.2 μm) coastal marine waters collected at various locations around the United Kingdom. The differences in colour is due to the range of soil-derived carbon input to the coastal water, with dark brown (left) indicating a high soil-derived carbon contribution and near-clear water (right) indicating a low soil-derived carbon contribution.

DOC is a basic nutrient, supporting growth of microorganisms and plays an important role in the global carbon cycle through the microbial loop. In some organisms (stages) that do not feed in the traditional sense, dissolved matter may be the only external food source. Moreover, DOC is an indicator of organic loadings in streams, as well as supporting terrestrial processing (e.g., within soil, forests, and wetlands) of organic matter. In the absence of extensive wetlands, bogs, or swamps, baseflow concentrations of DOC in undisturbed watersheds generally range from approximately 1 to 20 mg/L carbon. Carbon concentrations considerably vary across ecosystems. For example, the Everglades may be near the top of the range and the middle of oceans may be near the bottom. Occasionally, high concentrations of organic carbon indicate anthropogenic influences, but most DOC originates naturally.

Three main processes transform and remove DOC from an ecosystem: biodegradation, where microorganisms consume DOC, photodegradation, where light breaks it down, and flocculation, where DOC compounds aggregate or attach to particles. Both chemical properties and environmental factors affect how quickly different DOC compounds are degraded. In general, the different degradation processes target different DOC compounds.

The BDOC (bioavailable dissolved organic carbon) fraction consists of organic molecules that heterotrophic bacteria can use as a source of energy and carbon. Some subset of DOC constitutes the precursors of disinfection byproducts for drinking water. BDOC can contribute to undesirable biological regrowth within water distribution systems.

The dissolved fraction of total organic carbon (TOC) is an operational classification. Many researchers use the term "dissolved" for compounds that pass through a 0.45 μm filter, but 0.22 μm filters have also been used to remove higher colloidal concentrations.

A practical definition of dissolved typically used in marine chemistry is all substances that pass through a GF/F filter, which has a nominal pore size of approximately 0.7 μm (Whatman glass microfiber filter, 0.6–0.8 μm particle retention). The recommended procedure is the HTCO technique, which calls for filtration through pre-combusted glass fiber filters, typically the GF/F classification.

=== Reactivity ===
Dissolved organic matter can be degraded quickly or slowly, depending on its reactivity. Quickly degraded DOC can be classified as labile while persistent DOC can be considered recalcitrant or refractory. While labile DOC can degrade within seconds, refractory DOC can escape degradation and persist in the ocean for millennia. Depending on the origin and composition of DOC, its behavior and cycling are different. In the coastal ocean, organic matter from terrestrial plant litter or soils appears to be more refractory and thus often behaves conservatively. In addition, refractory DOC is produced in the ocean by the bacterial transformation of labile DOC, which reshapes its composition.

Due to the continuous production and degradation in natural systems, the DOC pool contains a spectrum of reactive compounds each with their own reactivity, that have been divided into fractions from labile to recalcitrant, depending on the turnover times, as shown in the following table...

DOC pool spectrum from labile to recalcitrant
DOC fraction	acronym	turnover time	amount
labile	DOCL	hours to days	< 200 Tg C
semi-labile	DOCSL	weeks to months	~600 Tg C
semi-recalcitrant	DOCSR	decades	~1400 Tg C
recalcitrant	DOCR	thousands of years	~63000 Tg C
highly resistant		tens of thousands of years	

This wide range in turnover or degradation times has been linked with the chemical composition, structure and molecular size, but degradation also depends on the environmental conditions (e.g., nutrients), prokaryote diversity, redox state, iron availability, mineral-particle associations, temperature, sun-light exposure, biological production of recalcitrant compounds, and the effect of priming or dilution of individual molecules. For example, lignin can be degraded in aerobic soils but is relatively recalcitrant in anoxic marine sediments. This example shows bioavailability varies as a function of the ecosystem's properties. Accordingly, even normally ancient and recalcitrant compounds, such as petroleum, carboxyl-rich alicyclic molecules, can be degraded in the appropriate environmental setting.

== Terrestrial ecosystems ==
=== Soil ===
Soil DOC sources and sinks

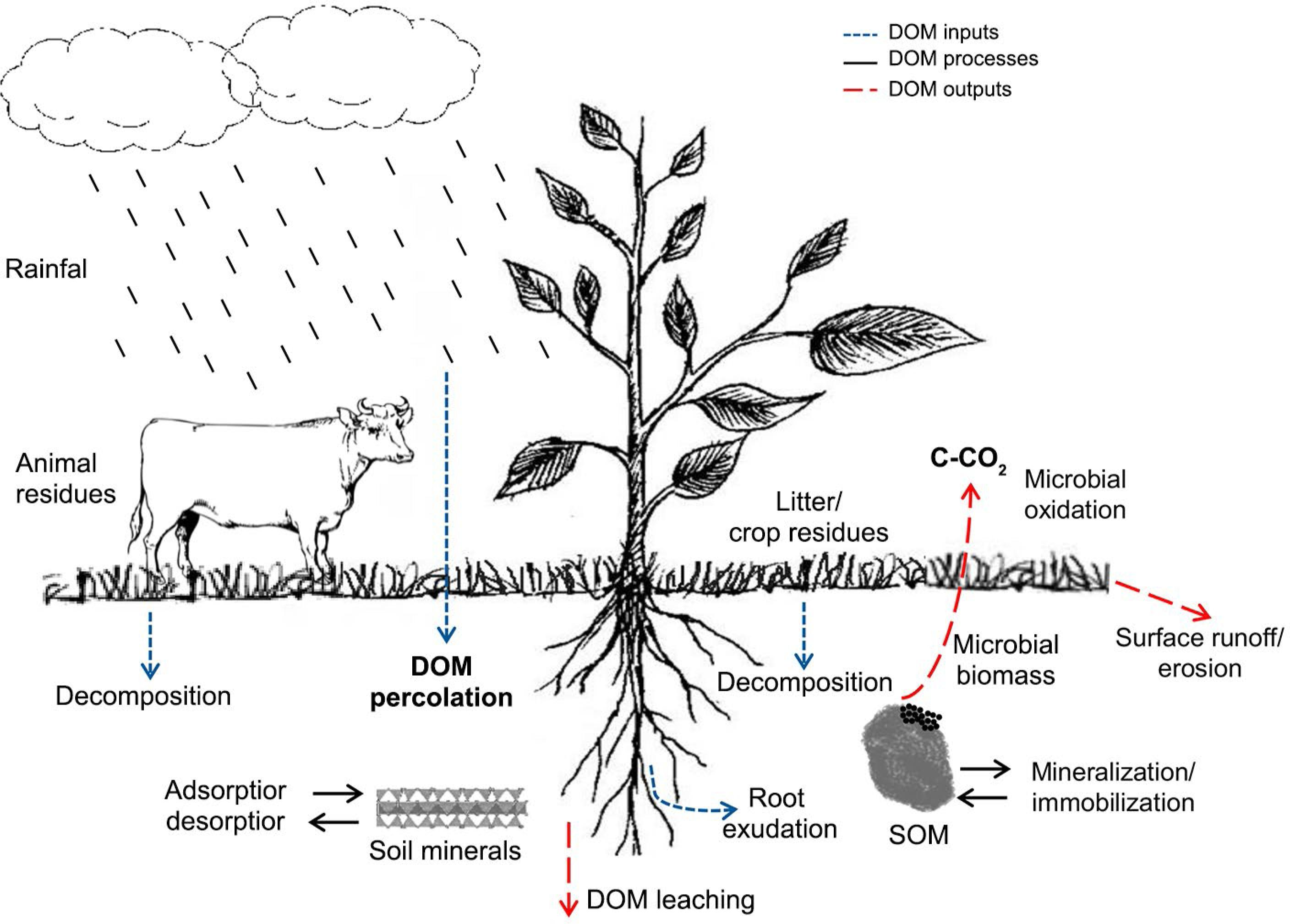
Sources and sinks of dissolved organic carbon in the soil system

Groundwater DOC sources

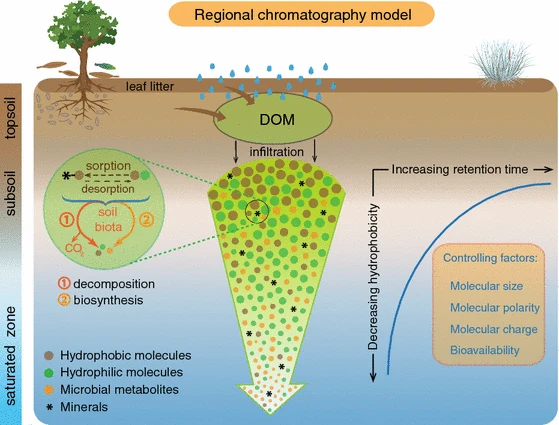
Origins and bioavailability of DOC in groundwater
DOM: dissolved organic matter

Freshwater DOC sources and sinks

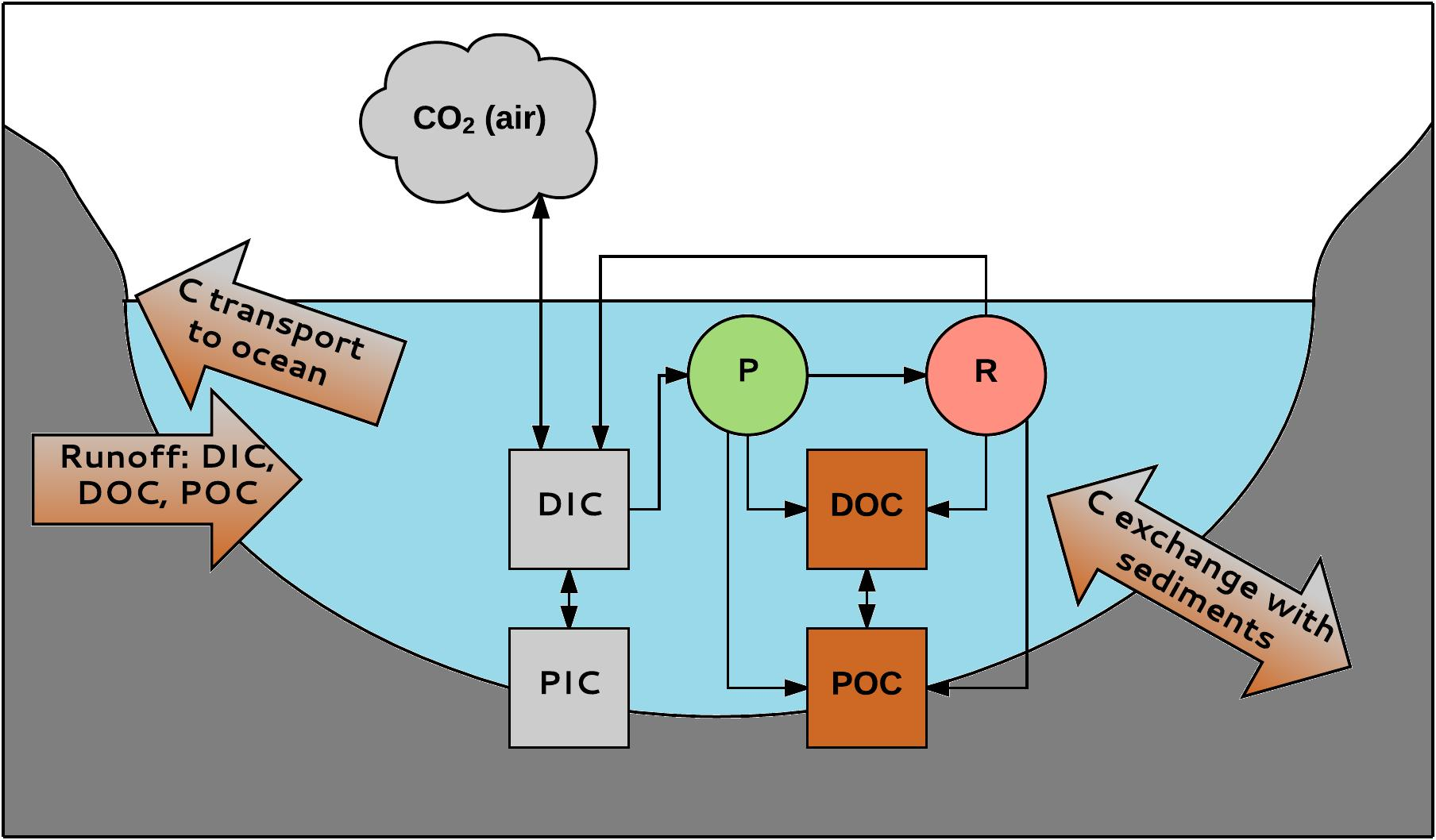
DOC and POC — DIC and PIC
Inland waters primarily receive carbon from terrestrial ecosystems. This carbon (1.9 Pg C y^{−1}) is transported to the oceans (0.9 Pg C y^{−1}), buried in the sediments (0.2 Pg C y^{−1}) or emitted as CO^{2} (0.8 Pg C y^{−1}). More recent estimations are different: In 2013, Raymond et al. claimed CO^{2} emission from inland waters can be as high as 2.1 Pg C y^{−1}.
P = photosynthesis R = respiration

Dissolved organic matter (DOM) is one of the most active and mobile carbon pools and has an important role in global carbon cycling. In addition, dissolved organic carbon (DOC) affects the soil negative electrical charges denitrification process, acid-base reactions in the soil solution, retention and translocation of nutrients (cations), and immobilization of heavy metals and xenobiotics. Soil DOM can be derived from different sources (inputs), such as atmospheric carbon dissolved in rainfall, litter and crop residues, manure, root exudates, and decomposition of soil organic matter (SOM). In the soil, DOM availability depends on its interactions with mineral components (e.g., clays, Fe and Al oxides) modulated by adsorption and desorption processes. It also depends on SOM fractions (e.g., stabilized organic molecules and microbial biomass) by mineralization and immobilization processes. In addition, the intensity of these interactions changes according to soil inherent properties, land use, and crop management.

During the decomposition of organic material, most carbon is lost as CO_{2} to the atmosphere by microbial oxidation. Soil type and landscape slope, leaching, and runoff are also important processes associated to DOM losses in the soil. In well-drained soils, leached DOC can reach the water table and release nutrients and pollutants that can contaminate groundwater, whereas runoff transports DOM and xenobiotics to other areas, rivers, and lakes.

=== Groundwater ===
Precipitation and surface water leaches dissolved organic carbon (DOC) from vegetation and plant litter and percolates through the soil column to the saturated zone. The concentration, composition, and bioavailability of DOC are altered during transport through the soil column by various physicochemical and biological processes, including sorption, desorption, biodegradation and biosynthesis. Hydrophobic molecules are preferentially partitioned onto soil minerals and have a longer retention time in soils than hydrophilic molecules. The hydrophobicity and retention time of colloids and dissolved molecules in soils are controlled by their size, polarity, charge, and bioavailability. Bioavailable DOM is subjected to microbial decomposition, resulting in a reduction in size and molecular weight. Novel molecules are synthesized by soil microbes, and some of these metabolites enter the DOC reservoir in groundwater.

=== Freshwater ecosystems ===
Aquatic carbon occurs in different forms. Firstly, a division is made between organic and inorganic carbon. Organic carbon is a mixture of organic compounds originating from detritus or primary producers. It can be divided into POC (particulate organic carbon; particles > 0.45 μm) and DOC (dissolved organic carbon; particles < 0.45 μm). DOC usually makes up 90% of the total amount of aquatic organic carbon. Its concentration ranges from 0.1 to >300 mg L^{−1}.

Likewise, inorganic carbon also consists of a particulate (PIC) and a dissolved phase (DIC). PIC mainly consists of carbonates (e.g., CaCO_{3}), DIC consists of carbonate (CO_{3}^{2-}), bicarbonate (HCO_{3}^{−}), CO_{2} and a negligibly small fraction of carbonic acid (H_{2}CO_{3}). The inorganic carbon compounds exist in equilibrium that depends on the pH of the water. DIC concentrations in freshwater range from about zero in acidic waters to 60 mg C L^{−1} in areas with carbonate-rich sediments.

POC can be degraded to form DOC; DOC can become POC by flocculation. Inorganic and organic carbon are linked through aquatic organisms. CO^{2} is used in photosynthesis (P) by for instance macrophytes, produced by respiration (R), and exchanged with the atmosphere. Organic carbon is produced by organisms and is released during and after their life; e.g., in rivers, 1–20% of the total amount of DOC is produced by macrophytes. Carbon can enter the system from the catchment and is transported to the oceans by rivers and streams. There is also exchange with carbon in the sediments, e.g., burial of organic carbon, which is important for carbon sequestration in aquatic habitats.

Aquatic systems are very important in global carbon sequestration; e.g., when different European ecosystems are compared, inland aquatic systems form the second largest carbon sink (19–41 Tg C y^{−1}); only forests take up more carbon (125–223 Tg C y^{−1}).

== Marine ecosystems ==
Ocean DOC sources and sinks

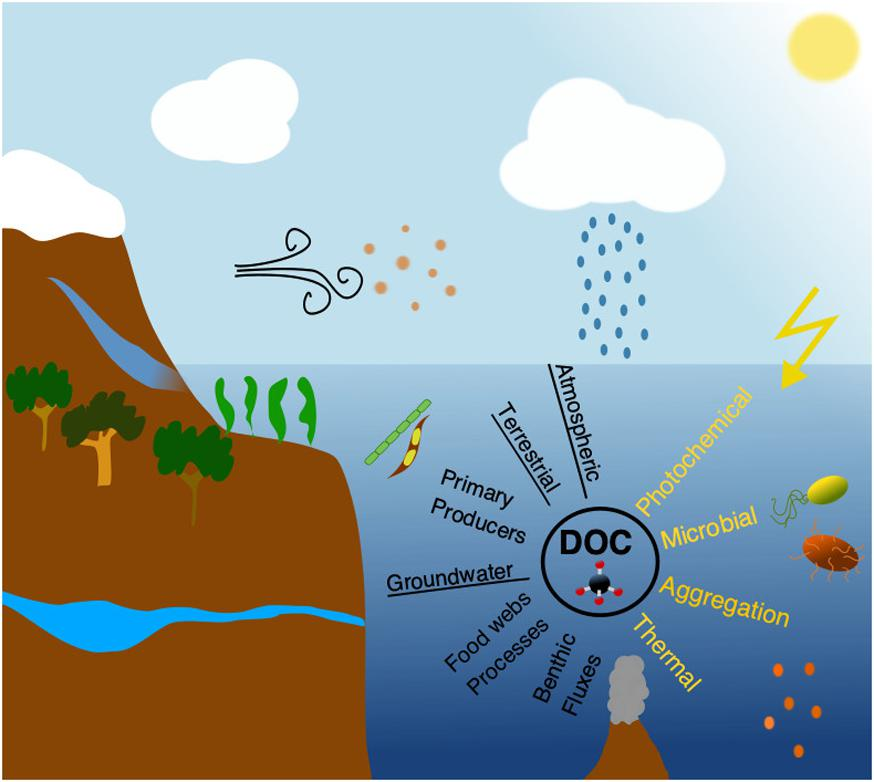
Simplified view of the main sources (black text; underlined are the allochthonous sources) and sinks (yellow text) of the oceanic dissolved organic carbon (DOC) pool.
Main sources
Most commonly referred sources of DOC are: atmospheric (e.g., rain and dust), terrestrial (e.g., rivers), primary producers (e.g., microalgae, cyanobacteria, macrophytes), groundwater, food chain processes (e.g., zooplankton grazing), and benthic fluxes (exchange of DOC across the sediment-water interface but also from hydrothermal vents).
Main sinks
The four main processes removing DOC from the water column are: photodegradation (particularly UV-radiation – though sometimes photodegradation "transforms" DOC rather than removing it, ending up with higher molecular weight complex molecules), microbial (mainly by prokaryotes), aggregation (primarily when river and seawater mixes) and thermal degradation (in e.g., hydrothermal systems).

=== Sources ===
In marine systems DOC originates from either autochthonous or allochthonous sources. Autochthonous DOC is produced within the system, primarily by plankton organisms and in coastal waters additionally by benthic microalgae, benthic fluxes, and macrophytes, whereas allochthonous DOC is mainly of terrestrial origin supplemented by groundwater and atmospheric inputs. In addition to soil derived humic substances, terrestrial DOC also includes material leached from plants exported during rain events, emissions of plant materials to the atmosphere and deposition in aquatic environments (e.g., volatile organic carbon and pollens), and also thousands of synthetic human-made organic chemicals that can be measured in the ocean at trace concentrations.

Dissolved organic carbon (DOC) represents one of the Earth's major carbon pools. It contains a similar amount of carbon as the atmosphere and exceeds the amount of carbon bound in marine biomass by more than two-hundred times. DOC is mainly produced in the near-surface layers during primary production and zooplankton grazing processes. Other sources of marine DOC are dissolution from particles, terrestrial and hydrothermal vent input, and microbial production. Prokaryotes (bacteria and archaea) contribute to the DOC pool via release of capsular material, exopolymers, and hydrolytic enzymes, as well as via mortality (e.g. viral shunt). Prokaryotes are also the main decomposers of DOC, although for some of the most recalcitrant forms of DOC very slow abiotic degradation in hydrothermal systems or possibly sorption to sinking particles may be the main removal mechanism. Mechanistic knowledge about DOC-microbe-interactions is crucial to understand the cycling and distribution of this active carbon reservoir.

==== Phytoplankton ====
Phytoplankton produces DOC by extracellular release commonly accounting between 5 and 30% of their total primary production, although this varies from species to species. Nonetheless, this release of extracellular DOC is enhanced under high light and low nutrient levels, and thus should increase relatively from eutrophic to oligotrophic areas, probably as a mechanism for dissipating cellular energy. Phytoplankton can also produce DOC by autolysis during physiological stress situations e.g., nutrient limitation. Other studies have demonstrated DOC production in association with meso- and macro-zooplankton feeding on phytoplankton and bacteria.

==== Zooplankton ====
Zooplankton-mediated release of DOC occurs through sloppy feeding, excretion and defecation which can be important energy sources for microbes. Such DOC production is largest during periods with high food concentration and dominance of large zooplankton species.

==== Bacteria and viruses ====
Bacteria are often viewed as the main consumers of DOC, but they can also produce DOC during cell division and viral lysis. The biochemical components of bacteria are largely the same as other organisms, but some compounds from the cell wall are unique and are used to trace bacterial derived DOC (e.g., peptidoglycan). These compounds are widely distributed in the ocean, suggesting that bacterial DOC production could be important in marine systems. Viruses are the most abundant life forms in the oceans infecting all life forms including algae, bacteria and zooplankton. After infection, the virus either enters a dormant (lysogenic) or productive (lytic) state. The lytic cycle causes disruption of the cell(s) and release of DOC.

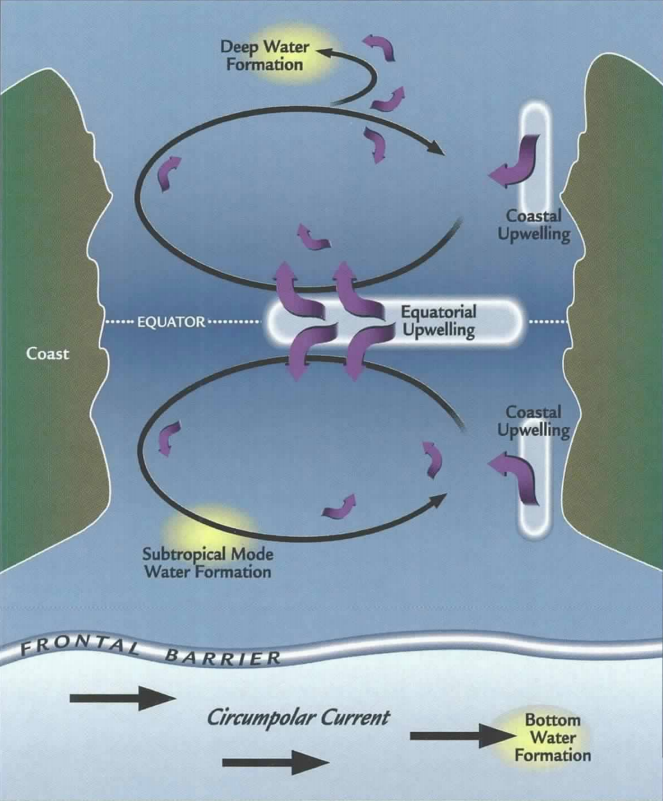
DOC net production, transport and export in the ocean Regions of significant net DOC production (broad arrows) include coastal and equatorial upwelling regions that support much of the global new production. DOC is transported into and around the subtropical gyres with the wind-driven surface circulation. Export takes place if exportable DOC (elevated concentrations indicated by dark blue fields) is present during overturning of the water column. precursor for deep and intermediate water mass formation. DOC is also exported with subduction in the gyres. In regions where DOCenriched subtropical water is prevented by polar frontal systems from serving as a precursor for overturning circulation (such as at the sites of Antarctic Bottom Water formation in the Southern Ocean) DOC export is a weak component of the biological pump. Waters south of the Antarctic Polar Front lack significant exportable DOC (depicted by light blue field) during winter.

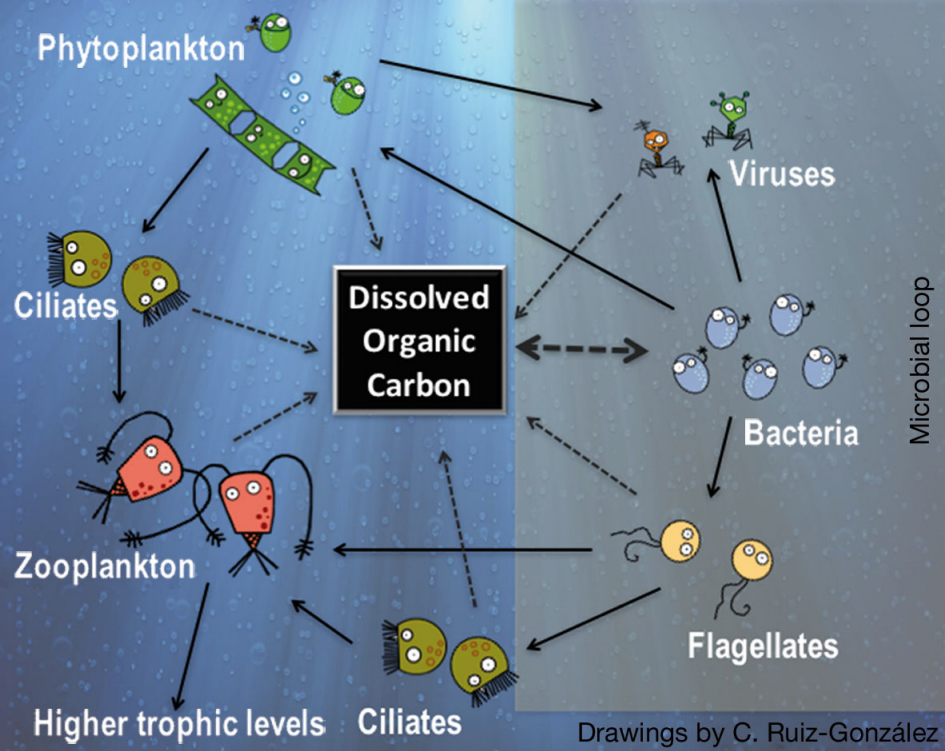
Simplified microbial food web in the sunlit ocean Left side: classic description of the carbon flow from photosynthetic algae to grazers and higher trophic levels in the food chain. Right side: microbial loop, with bacteria using dissolved organic carbon to gain biomass, which then re-enters the classic carbon flow through protists.

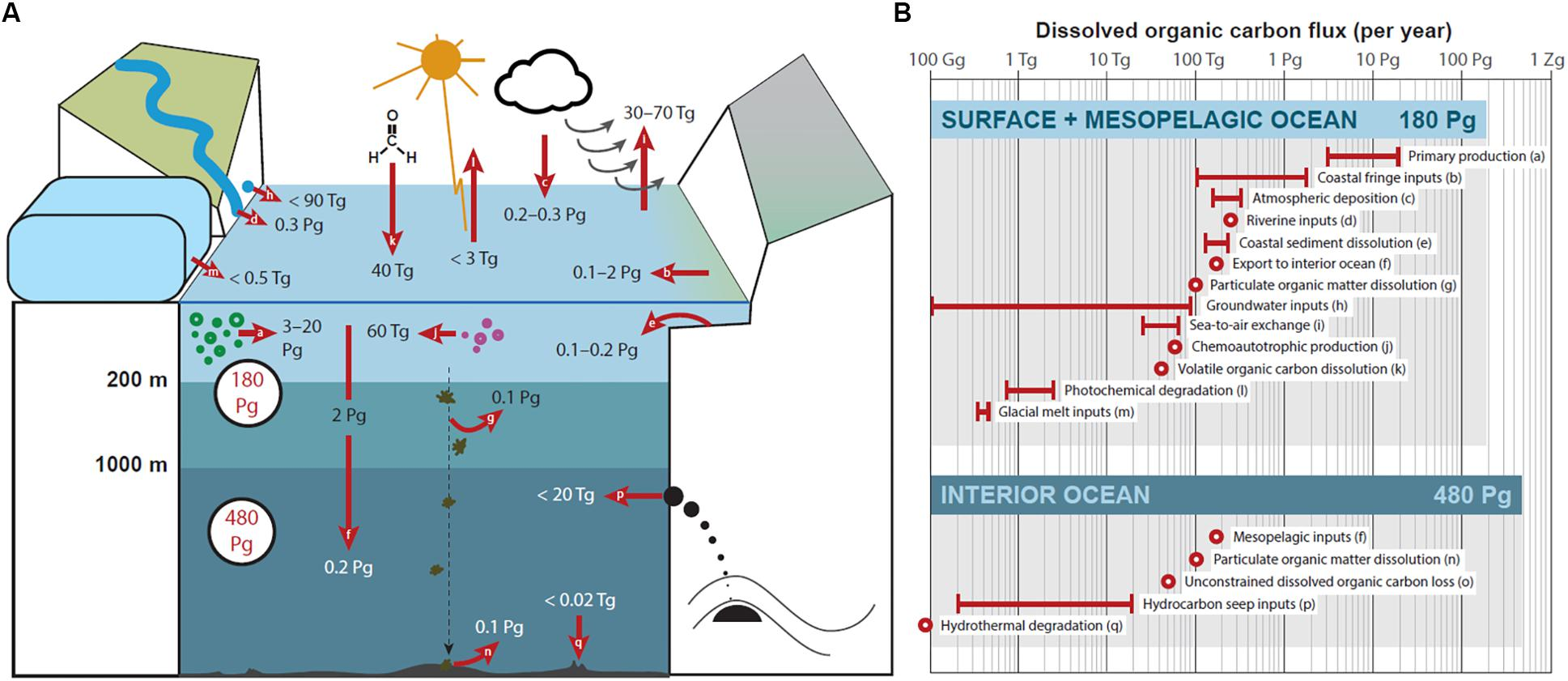
Dissolved organic carbon (DOC) fluxes in the surface, mesopelagic, and interior ocean In panel (A) oceanic DOC stocks are shown in black circles with red font and units are Pg-C. DOC fluxes are shown in black and white font and units are either Tg-C yr^{−1} or Pg-C yr^{−1}. Letters in arrows and associated flux values correspond to descriptions displayed in (B), which lists sources and sinks of oceanic DOC.

==== Macrophytes ====
Marine macrophytes (i.e., macroalgae and seagrass) are highly productive and extend over large areas in coastal waters but their production of DOC has not received much attention. Macrophytes release DOC during growth with a conservative estimate (excluding release from decaying tissues) suggesting that macroalgae release between 1–39% of their gross primary production, while seagrasses release less than 5% as DOC of their gross primary production. The released DOC has been shown to be rich in carbohydrates, with rates depending on temperature and light availability. Globally the macrophyte communities have been suggested to produce ~160 Tg C yr^{−1} of DOC, which is approximately half the annual global river DOC input (250 Tg C yr^{−1}).

==== Marine sediments ====
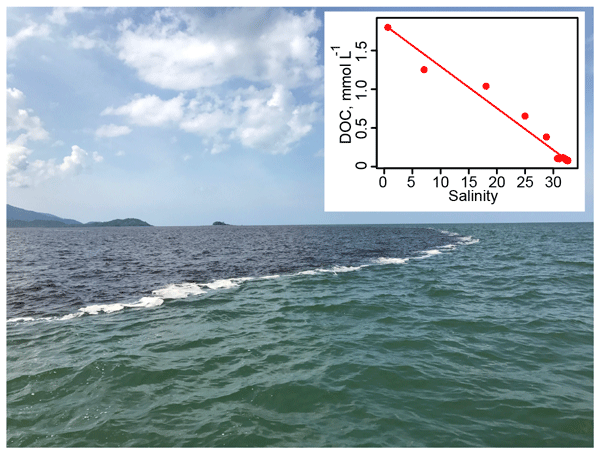
Peatland river water draining into coastal waters South-East Asia is home to one of the world's largest stores of tropical peatland and accounts for roughly 10 % of the global land-to-sea dissolved organic carbon (DOC) flux. The rivers carry high coloured dissolved organic matter (CDOM) concentrations, shown here interfacing with ocean shelf water.

Marine sediments represent the main sites of OM degradation and burial in the ocean, hosting microbes in densities up to 1000 times higher than found in the water column. The DOC concentrations in sediments are often an order of magnitude higher than in the overlying water column. This concentration difference results in a continued diffusive flux and suggests that sediments are a major DOC source releasing 350 Tg C yr^{−1}, which is comparable to the input of DOC from rivers. This estimate is based on calculated diffusive fluxes and does not include resuspension events which also releases DOC and therefore the estimate could be conservative. Also, some studies have shown that geothermal systems and petroleum seepage contribute with pre-aged DOC to the deep ocean basins, but consistent global estimates of the overall input are currently lacking. Globally, groundwaters account for an unknown part of the freshwater DOC flux to the oceans. The DOC in groundwater is a mixture of terrestrial, infiltrated marine, and in situ microbially produced material. This flux of DOC to coastal waters could be important, as concentrations in groundwater are generally higher than in coastal seawater, but reliable global estimates are also currently lacking.

=== Sinks ===
The main processes that remove DOC from the ocean water column are: (1) Thermal degradation in e.g., submarine hydrothermal systems; (2) bubble coagulation and abiotic flocculation into microparticles or sorption to particles; (3) abiotic degradation via photochemical reactions; and (4) biotic degradation by heterotrophic marine prokaryotes. It has been suggested that the combined effects of photochemical and microbial degradation represent the major sinks of DOC.

==== Thermal degradation ====
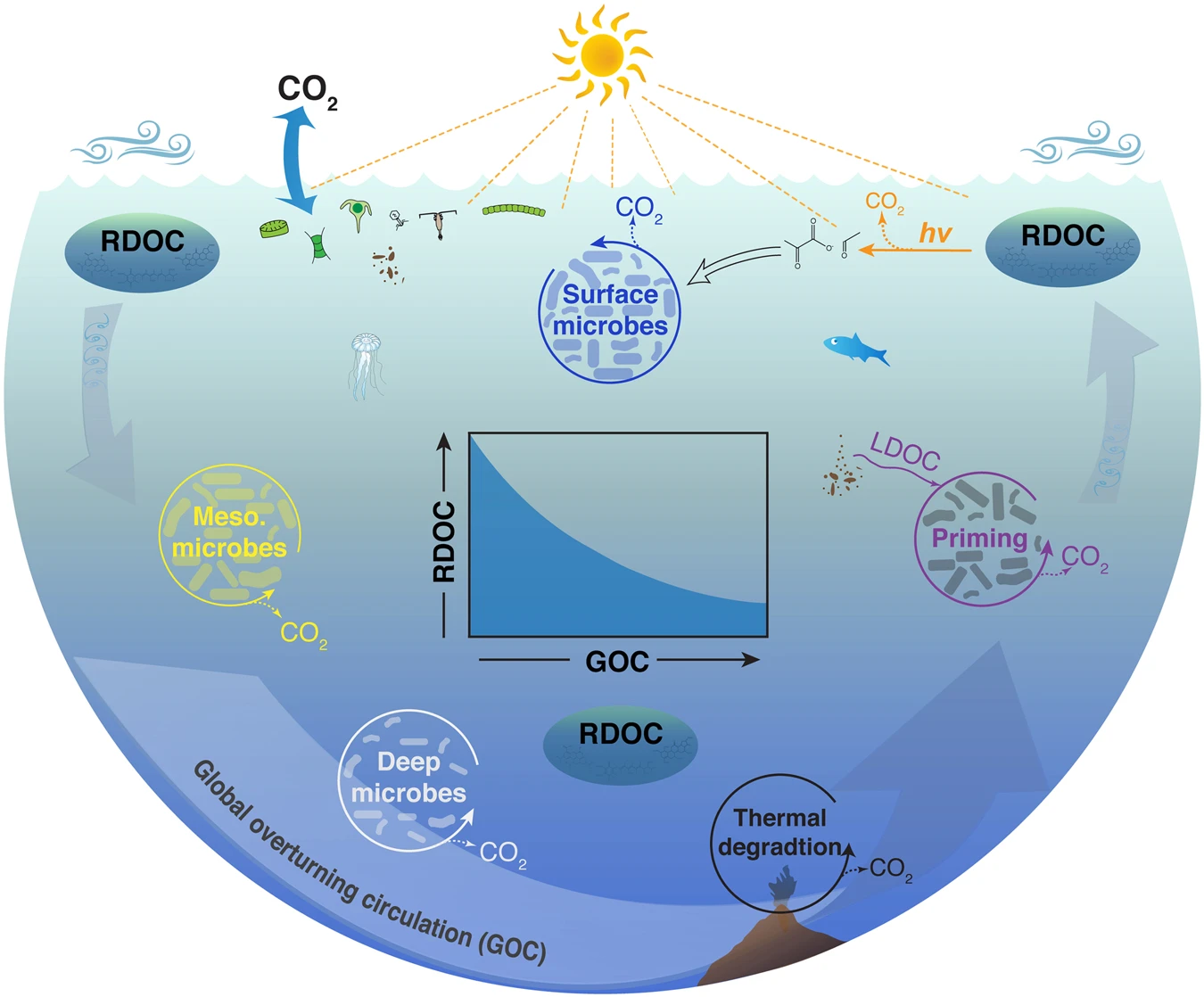
Removal of refractory DOC in the ocean
Phytoplankton production and food web dynamics in surface waters release a diverse mixture of dissolved molecules with varying reactivities. Bacteria and archaea utilize labile and semi-labile forms of DOC in surface and mesopelagic waters of the upper ocean, leaving behind a vast reservoir of refractory DOC (RDOC) that persists in the ocean for millennia. The ocean is a patchy environment that harbors a great diversity of microbes and physicochemical processes with the potential to remove refractory DOC when these molecules encounter environmental conditions and microbes that can degrade them. Physical mixing transports refractory DOC throughout the ocean realm and thereby increases the likelihood of its removal. Deep ocean waters can be entrained into hydrothermal circulation and associated DOC can be removed by thermal degradation. Sinking particles from the upper ocean release labile DOC (LDOC) that triggers hot spots of microbial activity and primes the removal of refractory molecules. Mixing of subsurface waters into sunlit waters exposes refractory DOC to warmer temperatures and photochemical processes that can mineralize and transform refractory molecules into simple compounds (e.g., pyruvate, formaldehyde) for rapid microbial utilization. Thus, it appears the lifetime of refractory molecules in the ocean is regulated by the rate of global overturning circulation (GOC). This relationship indicates a slowing of GOC could lead to an increase in the reservoir size of refractory DOC, assuming a constant production rate of refractory DOC (inset panel).

Thermal degradation of DOC has been found at high-temperature hydrothermal ridge-flanks, where outflow DOC concentrations are lower than in the inflow. While the global impact of these processes has not been investigated, current data suggest it is a minor DOC sink. Abiotic DOC flocculation is often observed during rapid (minutes) shifts in salinity when fresh and marine waters mix. Flocculation changes the DOC chemical composition, by removing humic compounds and reducing molecular size, transforming DOC to particulate organic flocs which can sediment and/or be consumed by grazers and filter feeders, but it also stimulates the bacterial degradation of the flocculated DOC. The impacts of flocculation on the removal of DOC from coastal waters are highly variable with some studies suggesting it can remove up to 30% of the DOC pool, while others find much lower values (3–6%;). Such differences could be explained by seasonal and system differences in the DOC chemical composition, pH, metallic cation concentration, microbial reactivity, and ionic strength.

==== CDOM ====
The colored fraction of DOC (CDOM) absorbs light in the blue and UV-light range and therefore influences plankton productivity both negatively by absorbing light, that otherwise would be available for photosynthesis, and positively by protecting plankton organisms from harmful UV-light. However, as the impact of UV damage and ability to repair is extremely variable, there is no consensus on how UV-light changes might impact overall plankton communities. The CDOM absorption of light initiates a complex range of photochemical processes, which can impact nutrient, trace metal and DOC chemical composition, and promote DOC degradation.

==== Photodegradation ====
Photodegradation involves the transformation of CDOM into smaller and less colored molecules (e.g., organic acids), or into inorganic carbon (CO, CO~~2~~), and nutrient salts (NH~~4~~^{−}, HPO^{2−}_{4}). Therefore, it generally means that photodegradation transforms recalcitrant into labile DOC molecules that can be rapidly used by prokaryotes for biomass production and respiration. However, it can also increase CDOM through the transformation of compounds such as triglycerides, into more complex aromatic compounds, which are less degradable by microbes. Moreover, UV radiation can produce e.g., reactive oxygen species, which are harmful to microbes. The impact of photochemical processes on the DOC pool depends also on the chemical composition, with some studies suggesting that recently produced autochthonous DOC becomes less bioavailable while allochthonous DOC becomes more bioavailable to prokaryotes after sunlight exposure, albeit others have found the contrary. Photochemical reactions are particularly important in coastal waters which receive high loads of terrestrial derived CDOM, with an estimated ~20–30% of terrestrial DOC being rapidly photodegraded and consumed. Global estimates also suggests that in marine systems photodegradation of DOC produces ~180 Tg C yr^{−1} of inorganic carbon, with an additional 100 Tg C yr^{−1} of DOC made more available to microbial degradation. Another attempt at global ocean estimates also suggest that photodegradation (210 Tg C yr^{−1}) is approximately the same as the annual global input of riverine DOC (250 Tg C yr^{−1};), while others suggest that direct photodegradation exceeds the riverine DOC inputs.

=== Recalcitrant and labile ===
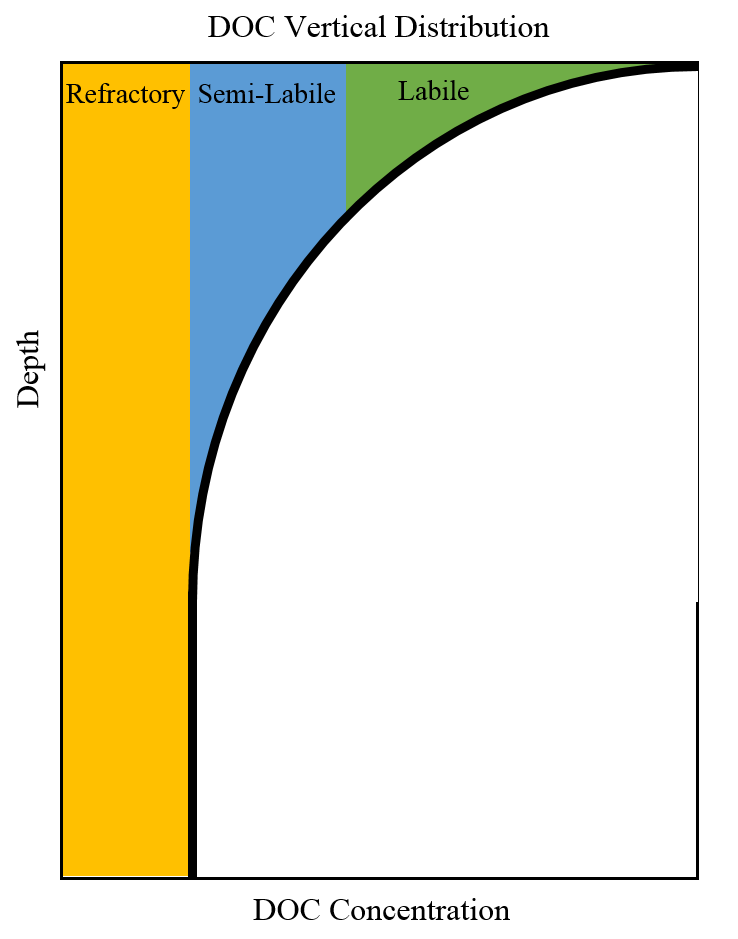
Change in the composition of DOC with depth

DOC is conceptually divided into labile DOC, which is rapidly taken up by heterotrophic microbes, and the recalcitrant (or refractory) DOC reservoir, which has accumulated in the ocean (following a definition by Hansell). As a consequence of its recalcitrance, the accumulated DOC reaches average radiocarbon ages between 1,000 and 4,000 years in surface waters, and between 3,000 and 6,000 years in the deep ocean, indicating that it persists through several deep ocean mixing cycles between 300 and 1,400 years each. Behind these average radiocarbon ages, a large spectrum of ages is hidden. Follett et al. showed DOC comprises a fraction of modern radiocarbon age, as well as DOC reaching radiocarbon ages of up to 12,000 years.

==== Distribution ====
More precise measurement techniques developed in the late 1990s have allowed for a good understanding of how dissolved organic carbon is distributed in marine environments both vertically and across the surface. It is now understood that dissolved organic carbon in the ocean spans a range from very labile to very recalcitrant (refractory). The labile dissolved organic carbon is mainly produced by marine organisms and is consumed in the surface ocean, and consists of sugars, proteins, and other compounds that are easily used by marine bacteria. Recalcitrant dissolved organic carbon is evenly spread throughout the water column and consists of high molecular weight and structurally complex compounds that are difficult for marine organisms to use such as the lignin, pollen, or humic acids. As a result, the observed vertical distribution consists of high concentrations of labile DOC in the upper water column and low concentrations at depth.

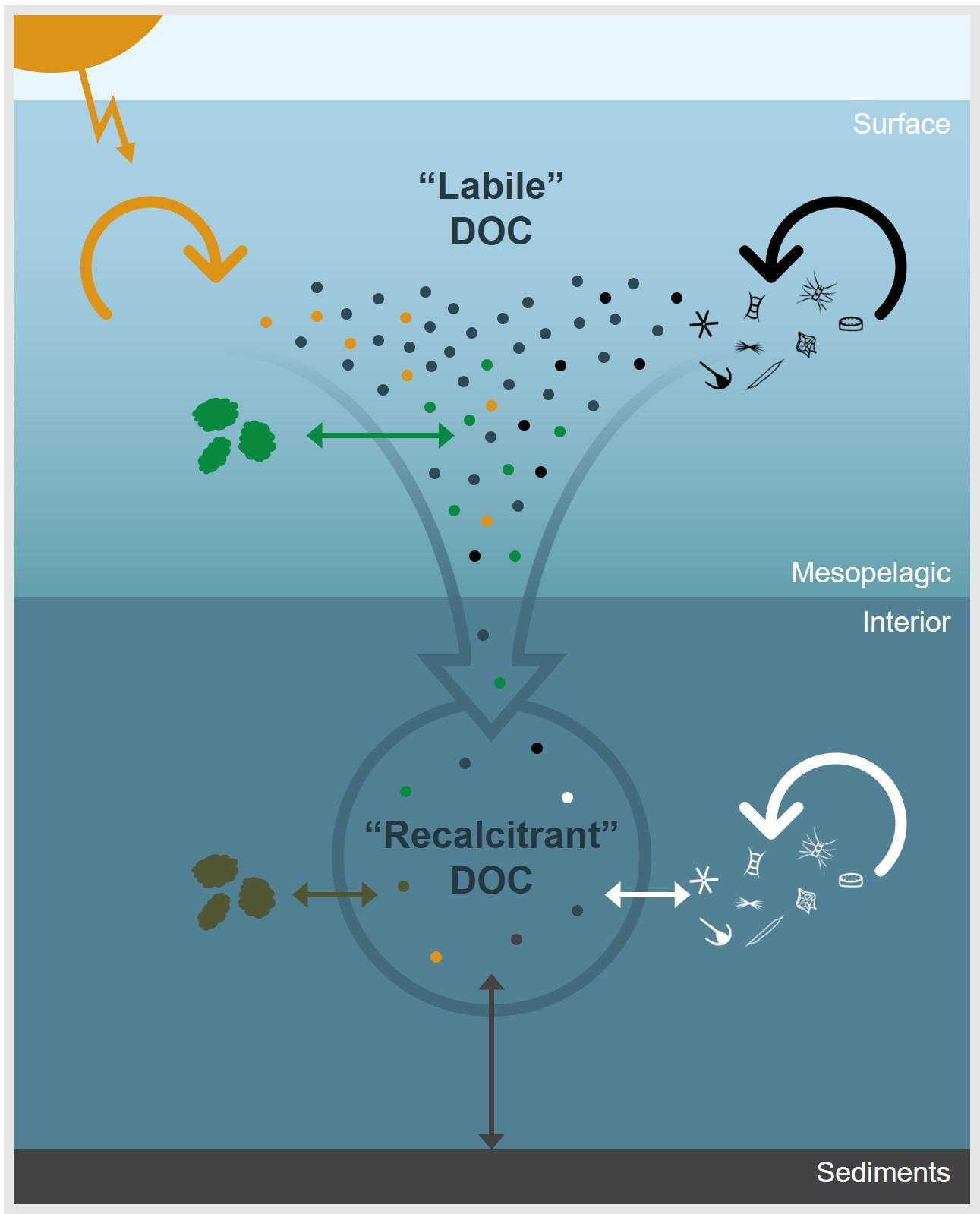
Environmental processes controlling the apparent recalcitrance of oceanic DOC
The dots represent DOC molecules and arrows represent physicochemical and biological processes that impact DOC concentration and molecular composition. In the surface ocean, DOC derived from primary production is rapidly remineralized or transformed through microbial degradation (black arrow), photochemical degradation (yellow arrow), or particle exchange (green arrow). Labile components are removed down the water column and DOC becomes diluted by processes, such as particle exchange (brown arrow), sediment dissolution (gray arrow), and microbial reworking (white arrow), which continue to alter, add, and/or remove molecules from the bulk DOC pool. Thus, the apparent recalcitrance of DOC in the ocean's interior is an emergent property that is largely controlled by environmental context.

In addition to vertical distributions, horizontal distributions have been modeled and sampled as well. In the surface ocean at a depth of 30 meters, the higher dissolved organic carbon concentrations are found in the South Pacific Gyre, the South Atlantic Gyre, and the Indian Ocean. At a depth of 3,000 meters, highest concentrations are in the North Atlantic Deep Water where dissolved organic carbon from the high concentration surface ocean is removed to depth. While in the northern Indian Ocean high DOC is observed due to high fresh water flux and sediments. Since the time scales of horizontal motion along the ocean bottom are in the thousands of years, the refractory dissolved organic carbon is slowly consumed on its way from the North Atlantic and reaches a minimum in the North Pacific.

==== As emergent ====
Dissolved organic matter is a heterogeneous pool of thousands, likely millions, of organic compounds. These compounds differ not only in composition and concentration (from pM to μM), but also originate from various organisms (phytoplankton, zooplankton, and bacteria) and environments (terrestrial vegetation and soils, coastal fringe ecosystems) and may have been produced recently or thousands of years ago. Moreover, even organic compounds deriving from the same source and of the same age may have been subjected to different processing histories prior to accumulating within the same pool of DOM.

Interior ocean DOM is a highly modified fraction that remains after years of exposure to sunlight, utilization by heterotrophs, flocculation and coagulation, and interaction with particles. Many of these processes within the DOM pool are compound- or class-specific. For example, condensed aromatic compounds are highly photosensitive, whereas proteins, carbohydrates, and their monomers are readily taken up by bacteria. Microbes and other consumers are selective in the type of DOM they utilize and typically prefer certain organic compounds over others. Consequently, DOM becomes less reactive as it is continually reworked. Said another way, the DOM pool becomes less labile and more refractory with degradation. As it is reworked, organic compounds are continually being added to the bulk DOM pool by physical mixing, exchange with particles, and/or production of organic molecules by the consumer community. As such, the compositional changes that occur during degradation are more complex than the simple removal of more labile components and resultant accumulation of remaining, less labile compounds.

Dissolved organic matter recalcitrance (i.e., its overall reactivity toward degradation and/or utilization) is therefore an emergent property. The perception of DOM recalcitrance changes during organic matter degradation and in conjunction with any other process that removes or adds organic compounds to the DOM pool under consideration.

The surprising resistance of high concentrations of DOC to microbial degradation has been addressed by several hypotheses. The prevalent notion is that the recalcitrant fraction of DOC has certain chemical properties, which prevent decomposition by microbes ("intrinsic stability hypothesis"). An alternative or additional explanation is given by the "dilution hypothesis", that all compounds are labile, but exist in concentrations individually too low to sustain microbial populations but collectively form a large pool. The dilution hypothesis has found support in recent experimental and theoretical studies.

== DOM isolation and analysis ==
DOM is commonly analyzed using absorbance and fluorescence spectroscopy, which measure different compounds' abilities to absorb and emit light. DOM is found in low concentrations in nature for direct analysis with NMR or MS. Moreover, DOM samples often contain high concentrations of inorganic salts that are incompatible with such techniques. Therefore, it is necessary a concentration and isolation step of the sample. The most used isolation techniques are ultrafiltration, reverse osmosis, and solid-phase extraction. Among them solid-phase extraction is considered as the cheapest and easiest technique.

== See also ==
- Blackwater river
- Dissolved inorganic carbon
- Foam line
- Microbial loop
- Microbial carbon pump
- Total organic carbon
