= Falklands Day =

Holiday in Falkland Islands

- Observed by: Falkland Islanders
- Type: National Day of Falkland Islands.
- Date: 14 August
- Frequency: Annual
- Related to: Falkland Islands

Falklands Day is the celebration of the first sighting of the Falkland Islands by John Davis in 1592, and is celebrated on 14 August.

It was once seen as the National Day of the Falklands, but has largely been replaced by Liberation Day which commemorates the end of the Falklands War. Falkland Day ceased be to a public holiday in 2002 when the Executive Council moved the holiday to provide for the re-introduction of Peat Cutting Day, on the first Monday in October.
